= Pornography in the United Kingdom =

In the United Kingdom, pornography is regulated by a variety of laws, regulations, judicial processes and voluntary schemes. Pornographic material generally has to be assessed by regulators or courts to determine its legality. British censorship laws with regard to pornography have often been some of the most restrictive in Western Europe.

In 19th-century Britain Victorian erotica included French photographs, erotic prints and printed literature. As technology has advanced, pornography has taken diverse forms and become more widespread in society. In the twentieth century the production of pornographic magazines and films developed, and by the twenty-first century pornography was available by telephone, on television and via the internet.

By 2006, the UK pornography industry was estimated to be worth about £1 billion, compared to £20 billion worldwide.

== Legal situation ==
The UK has a markedly different tradition of pornography regulation from that found in most other Western countries, which legalised hardcore pornography during the 1960s and 1970s. By contrast the UK was almost the only liberal democracy not to do so and the UK's obscenity laws, such as the Obscene Publications Act 1959, (Note: The Obscene Publications Acts only apply to England and Wales.) remained strict by European standards. Other acts of parliament such as the Civic Government (Scotland) Act 1982 and the Video Recordings Act 1984 combined with the Obscene Publications Acts to set the criteria for the types of material that could be publicly accessed and distributed in any form in the UK. Together they created an effective ban on the publication and distribution, though not possession, of many types of pornography. However, this legislation was found to be difficult to enforce due to the vagueness of the legal test of material that "depraves and corrupts".

Under the Obscene Publications Act, stocks of pornographic magazines are usually confiscated on the judgement of a magistrate rather than their publishers being prosecuted in a court of law. The importation of "indecent" materials is prohibited by the 1876 Customs Consolidation Act. HM Customs and Excise impounded around 5,600 of such books and magazines in 1960, and by 1969 the figure was over 2 million items. The distribution of indecent or obscene materials by post is forbidden under the 1953 Post Office Act.

The sale of hardcore pornography remained illegal until the end of the 20th century, although the ownership of such material was not a criminal offence. Printed hardcore pornography was banned under the Obscene Publications Act 1959, while hardcore videotapes and DVDs were prohibited due to the requirement under the Video Recordings Act 1984

With regard to legislation, the Sexual Offences Act 2003 (in England and Wales), the Sexual Offences (Scotland) Act 2009 (in Scotland), and the Sexual Offences (Northern Ireland) Order 2008 (in Northern Ireland) each make it a criminal offence for an adult to show pornographic material to a minor (defined under all relevant legislation as a person under 16).

In addition to this, terms set out in the Video Recordings Act 1984, require that all material released in the UK on a video format, must first be classified by the British Board of Film Classification (BBFC), who assign their own classification model to such works. Under the Licensing Act 2003, works released in a theatrical setting must also hold a valid classification (either issued by the BBFC, or by a local council). These terms are therefore also extended to apply to pornography released either on film (i.e. theatrically), or on video.

At the beginning of the 21st century, as a result of liberalisation in BBFC policy, mainstream hardcore DVDs began to receive R18 certificates, legalising them but restricting their sale to licensed sex shops such as those in Soho in London. UK-based websites that stream video content were also made subject to these content standards. European, American and British hardcore pornographic magazines became available in sex shops and by mail order, while softcore magazines continued to be sold openly in many British newsagents.

This did not, however, result in the UK legalising all types of pornography. In the 2004–2005 fiscal year, officers of HM Revenue and Customs seized 96,783 items of pornographic media carried by people travelling into the UK. Although the UK was a member state of the European Union until 2020, it was the only EU country to prohibit private imports of adult pornography by consumers travelling from other EU countries.

=== Crime and Policing Act 2026 ===
The Crime and Policing Act 2026 banned the possession and publication of pornography in the United Kingdom if it shows suffocation, strangulation, or sexual roleplay involving people pretending to be closely related or "where a reasonable person would think at least one person is, or is pretending to be, under 16." Publication carries a maximum penalty of five years' imprisonment (which could include uploading, posting or otherwise making the content available to someone online), possession of images depicting sexual activity involving a person pretending to be under 16 could face up to three years' imprisonment, and possession of images depicting strangulation, suffocation, or penetrative sexual activity between certain relatives could face up to two years' imprisonment. The ban took effect from 6 November 2026.

Senior editor at Reason, Elizabeth Nolan Brown, called it "absurd to throw people into prison for such content, whatever you think of such content yourself." Adult content creators, free speech advocates and experts have opposed the ban. Myles Jackman, an obscenity lawyer in the UK said of the ban, "I would encourage both content creators and consumers to underscore the risks of this law because to me, it genuinely seems like one of the greatest acts of suppression of free speech in global history."

== Literature ==
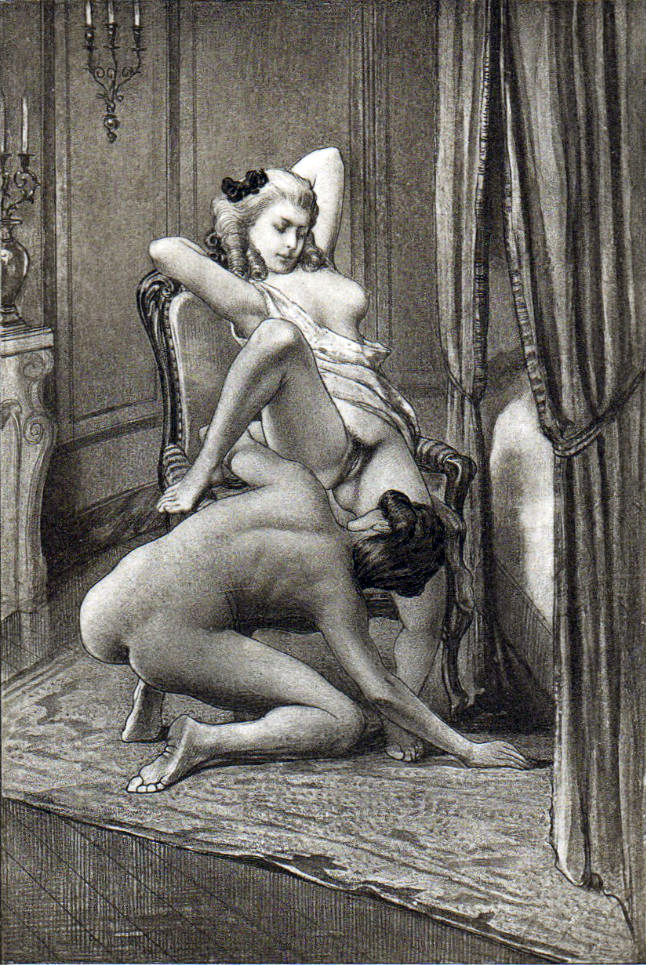
Illustration by Édouard-Henri Avril showing a scene from chapter eight of Fanny Hill (1748)

In medieval England, erotic or pornographic publications were the concern of the ecclesiastical courts. After the Reformation the jurisdiction of these courts declined in favour of the Crown which licensed every printed book.

In his diary, Samuel Pepys records purchasing a copy of L'Escole des Filles, a French work printed in 1655 that is considered to be the beginning of pornography in France for solitary reading. He then burns it so that it would not be discovered by his wife; "the idle roguish book, L'escholle de filles; which I have bought in plain binding… because I resolve, as soon as I have read it, to burn it."

An early pioneer of the publication of erotic works in England was Edmund Curll (1675–1747). The conviction of Curll in 1727 for the publication of Venus in the Cloister or the Nun in her Smock under the common law offence of disturbing the peace appears to be the first conviction for obscenity in the United Kingdom, and set a legal precedent for other convictions.

Memoirs of a Woman of Pleasure (later abridged and renamed Fanny Hill) was written in 1748 by John Cleland. It was scandalous for depicting a woman, the narrator, enjoying and even revelling in sexual acts with no dire moral or physical consequences. The text is hardly explicit as Cleland wrote the entire book using euphemisms for sex acts and body parts, employing 50 different ones just for the term penis. Cleland was arrested and briefly imprisoned but no proceedings were taken against the publishers. Fanny Hill continued to be published and is one of the most reprinted books in the English language.

In the 18th century directories of prostitutes and their services, such as Harris's List of Covent Garden Ladies (1757–1795), provided both entertainment and instruction.

In the Victorian period, significant elements of sado-masochism were present in some examples of erotic fiction, perhaps reflecting the influence of the English public school, where flagellation was routinely used as a punishment. Erotic spanking was the subject of books such as Lady Bumtickler's Revels and Exhibition of Female Flagellants. Clandestine erotic periodicals of this age include The Pearl, The Oyster and The Boudoir. Erotic fiction at this time was often anonymous or written under a pseudonym. The centre of the trade in such material in England at this period was Holywell Street, off the Strand, London.

Publishers of erotic fiction at the end of the 19th century and the beginning of the 20th century began to be subject to legal injunctions from the British authorities in order to prohibit their trade in such material. Because of this legal harassment some took to conducting business from Paris.

Olympia Press, a Paris-based publisher, launched in 1953 by Maurice Girodias, published a mix of erotic fiction and avant-garde literary works. It specialized in books which could not be published (without legal action) in the English-speaking world, and correctly assumed that the French, who were unable to read the books, and were more sexually tolerant, would leave them alone.

Since the 1950s the publication of pornographic literature in England and Wales has been governed by the Obscene Publications Act 1959. The act created a new offence for publishing obscene material, but the wording of the act is famously vague, defining obscenity as material likely to "deprave and corrupt". The 1959 act was passed just as most Western countries were about to enter a new phase of sexual freedom. The scope of the legislation led to the subsequent notorious targeting of now acknowledged classics of world literature by such authors as Zola, James Joyce and D.H. Lawrence plus medical textbooks by such as Havelock Ellis rather than the blatant erotica which was the original target of this law. The trial of Penguin Books over Lady Chatterley's Lover in 1960 failed to secure a conviction and the conviction in the 1971 trial of Oz magazine was overturned on appeal. Fanny Hill became legally available for the first time in 1970.

Purely textual pornographic texts, with no hint of libel, ceased to be brought to trial following the collapse of the Inside Linda Lovelace trial in 1976. However, in 2008, a man was unsuccessfully prosecuted under the Obscene Publications Act (the R v Walker trial) for posting fictional written material to the Internet allegedly describing the kidnap, rape and murder of the pop group Girls Aloud.

== Photography ==
In 1841, William Fox Talbot patented the calotype process, the first negative-positive process, making possible multiple copies. This invention permitted an almost limitless number of prints to be produced from a glass negative. Also, the reduction in exposure time made a true mass market for pornographic pictures possible. The technology was immediately employed to reproduce nude portraits, with Paris at the centre of the trade. Pornographic photographs were often produced in sets (of four, eight or twelve), and exported internationally, mainly to England and the United States. Many dealers took advantage of the postal system to send out photographic cards in plain wrappings to their subscribers. At this time, it became popular to depict nude photographs of women of exotic ethnicities, under the umbrella of science. Studies of this type can be found in the work of Eadweard Muybridge. Although he photographed both men and women, the women were often given props like market baskets and fishing poles, making the images of women thinly disguised erotica.

The first business venture of pioneering British pornographers David Sullivan and David Gold was selling soft pornography photos by mail order at the end of the 1960s.

== Magazines ==
During the Victorian period, illegal pornographic periodicals such as The Pearl, which ran for eighteen issues between 1879 and 1880, circulated clandestinely among circles of elite urban gentlemen. At the beginning of the 20th century the invention of halftone printing led to the appearance of magazines such as Photo Bits featuring nude (often, burlesque actresses were hired as models) and semi-nude photographs on the cover and throughout; while these would now be termed softcore, they were quite shocking for the time. These publications soon either masqueraded as "art magazines" or publications celebrating the new cult of naturism. Health and Efficiency, started in the early twentieth century, was a typical UK naturist magazine.

Following the Second World War, digest magazines such as Beautiful Britons, Spick and Span began to appear, with their interest in nylons and underwear. The racier Kamera published by Harrison Marks was a very popular publication. These magazines featured nude or semi-nude women in coy or flirtatious poses with no hint of pubic hair. Bob Guccione started Penthouse in the United Kingdom in 1965 to compete against Playboy. Penthouse's style was different to other magazines; with women looking indirectly at the camera, as if they were going about their private idylls. This change of emphasis influenced erotic depictions of women. Penthouse was also the first magazine to publish pictures that included pubic hair and full frontal nudity, both of which were considered beyond the bounds of the erotic and in the realm of pornography at the time. In 1965, Mayfair was launched in the UK in competition with both Playboy and Penthouse. As competition between the magazines increased, their photos became more explicit.

Hardcore magazines were being imported illegally from Scandinavia during the 1960s and illegally sold in sex shops in Soho's red light district in London. By the late 1960s, British magazines began to move into more explicit displays, often focusing on the buttocks as standards of what could be legally depicted and what readers wanted to see changed. Fiesta magazine, first published in 1966 by Galaxy Publications, introduced a "Readers' Wives Striptease" section in the early 1970s. This consisted of a set of photos of a supposed wife or girlfriend of a reader undressing to full nudity. The "Readers Wives" concept was subsequently adopted in a number of other magazines. Galaxy also began publishing Knave as a slightly classier sister magazine to Fiesta in 1968.

The production of softcore publications expanded during the late 1960s and early 1970s. In the 1970s magazines containing images of the pubic area became increasingly common. David Gold set up Gold Star Publications to publish adult magazines in the early 1970s. The company supplied many stores around the UK and in 1972 Gold was unsuccessfully prosecuted three times for publishing obscene material. David Sullivan became his business partner and by the late 1970s their company was in control of half of the adult magazine market, publishing major titles such as Playbirds, Whitehouse, Rustler and Raider. Strip club owner Paul Raymond, the owner of Paul Raymond Publications, launched Men Only in 1971, and then Club International in 1972. Subsequent titles included Escort launched in 1980, Razzle in 1983 and Men's World in 1988. Publishing group Northern & Shell obtained the licence to publish Penthouse in the United Kingdom in 1983, which led to them subsequently publishing a range of 45 adult magazine titles, including Asian Babes launched in 1992.

An attempt to open up the market to women in the early 1990s by publishing women's erotica magazines was largely a failure, possibly due to British obscenity laws which forbade the display of an erect penis. For Women was one exception, and it achieved widespread circulation. In the same decade "Lads' Mags" such as Loaded and Front appeared as an expression of lad culture. These were men's lifestyle magazines that included glamour photography of scantily-clad female models. They achieved high circulation figures and were a major competitor to softcore pornography magazines, which by 1995 made up less than 64% of the magazine market aimed at male readers.

More explicit pornographic magazines also began to appear in the UK during the 1990s, typically imported from Scandinavia or the Netherlands, emulating the hard-core style of US magazines such as Hustler. These magazines featured masturbation, sexual penetration, lesbianism and homosexuality, group sex and fetishes. Hardcore magazines are typically only sold in sex shops or by mail order because UK law does not allow hardcore R18 certificate imagery to be sold in any other type of shop.

Sex shops are required to have a sex establishment licence from their local authority, and so British softcore magazines are mainly sold in newsagents' shops and petrol stations. Their popular name "top-shelf magazines" derives from the tradition of keeping them out of the reach of children by placing them on the top shelf of the magazine display. By the end of the twentieth century British adult magazine market was in decline, but there were still about 100 adult magazine titles in the UK and the top ten titles had a combined UK sales estimated at 2 million. The market supported a growing number of specialist magazines whose titles indicated their contents: 40 Plus, Fat and 40, Skinny and Wriggly and Leg Love. Paul Raymond Publications dominated the market, distributing eight of the country's ten top selling adult magazines.

== Cinema ==
The British Board of Film Classification (BBFC) was established in 1912 as the British Board of Film Censors by members of the film industry, who would rather manage their own censorship than have national or local government do it for them. It began operating on 1 January 1913. Its legal basis was the Cinematograph Act 1909, which required cinemas to have licences from local authorities. A court ruling determined that the criteria for granting or refusing a licence did not have to be restricted to issues of health and safety. Given that the law now allowed councils to grant or refuse licences to cinemas according to the content of the films they showed, the 1909 Act therefore enabled the introduction of censorship. The film industry, fearing the economic consequences of a largely unregulated censorship infrastructure, therefore formed the BBFC to take the process 'in house' and establish its own system of self-regulation.

After the Second World War, developments in cinema technology stimulated the growth of a mass market, particularly the introduction of the 8mm and super-8 film gauges which resulted in the widespread use of amateur cinematography. Entrepreneurs emerged to supply this market, such as Harrison Marks who produced 8mm "glamour home movies" throughout the 1960s.

Nudity in film came to the British cinema screen with the British nudist films of the 1960s, beginning with Harrison Marks' Naked as Nature Intended in 1961. These films claimed to depict the lifestyles of members of the nudism or naturist movement, but were largely a vehicle for the exhibition of female nudity. They were mainly shot in naturist resorts, but augmented by attractive glamour models. The nudity was strictly non-sexual and when filmed frontally the members' pubic area was strictly covered by the angle of shot or some clothing or other objects. There was uninhibited exposure of breasts and backsides. The acting and technical production standards were not very high and the outlets for their exhibition were very limited, as was the size of the audience interested in these films, and many films were re-released several times under new titles, to trick patrons into seeing the films additional times. What audience there was lost interest in these films by the mid-1960s and production ceased.

In continental Europe, films were more explicit in the 1960s, and some of these more explicit imported foreign films began to appear in the UK in that decade. The legalisation of pornography in Denmark and the Netherlands (1969) and Sweden (1971) led to an explosion of commercially produced pornography in those countries. The Color Climax Corporation became the leading European pornographic producer for the next couple of decades. In public cinemas in the UK, imported pornographic films were subject to a great deal of censorship and had many cuts in them. However, uncut pornographic films were often smuggled into the UK, where they were sold "under the counter" or (sometimes) shown in "members only" cinema clubs. Hardcore films could be screened in British cinemas if they were run on a "Membership Only" club basis. Membership Only cinemas worked on the principle that the premises had to be privately owned, and that customers had to sign a form which instantly made them members. On account of this legal loophole in the Cinematograph Act 1952, these cinemas were free to show material without it first being passed by the BBFC or local council, and would also be immune to prosecution under the obscene publications act. Cinemas began using this loophole to show soft core sex films in the 1960s, when Tony Tenser opened the Compton Cinema Club in London's Soho. In the 1970s John Lindsay produced numerous short hardcore pornographic films on 16 mm film for distribution on 8 mm film. Lindsay was the first to introduce hardcore films to the Membership Only cinemas when he opened the London Blue Movie Centre in Berwick Street and the Taboo Club in Great Newport Street. Other rival cinemas followed suit, notably the Cineclub 24 in Tottenham Court Road, the Compton Cinema Club, and the Exxon Cinema Club run by David Waterfield in Danbury Street, Islington. Membership Only hardcore film clubs remained legal until the passing of the Cinematograph Act 1982.

The end of the 1960s saw the appearance of British sexploitation films in public cinemas, such as Her Private Hell (1968) and The Wife Swappers (1969). Changes to the British cinema certification system in 1970 replaced the previous X rating at 16 with a AA category for those over 14 and a new age for X-films at 18. British sex comedy films appeared in the 1970s, such as Confessions of a Window Cleaner (1974), Eskimo Nell (1975) and I'm Not Feeling Myself Tonight (1976). Combining full frontal nudity and depictions of simulated sex, these films were among the most popular British films of the decade. In the late 1970s David Sullivan produced several low-budget British sex films including Come Play with Me (1977) (directed by Harrison Marks). This was followed by The Playbirds (1978), Confessions from the David Galaxy Affair (1979) and Queen of the Blues (1979), all starring his then-girlfriend Mary Millington. After Millington's suicide in August 1979 Sullivan continued with Mary Millington's True Blue Confessions (1980) and Emmanuelle in Soho (1981). David McGillivray identifies Emmanuelle in Soho as marking the end of the British sex film. While the 1970s were the heyday of exploitation cinema, softcore sex films eventually succumbed to the combination of legalised hardcore pornography in other countries and the widespread availability of home video recorders in the UK. In the early 1980s publisher Paul Raymond was responsible for a small number of softcore films before moving entirely to video. The film Paul Raymond's Erotica (1981) included extensive footage of the 1970s version of The Festival of Erotica show at the Raymond Revuebar, while Electric Blue - The Movie (1982) was a film tie-in based on a series of UK pornographic videos and was shown in cinemas.

The BBFC remains the de facto film censor for films in the United Kingdom. Deep Throat (1972) was not approved in its uncut form in the UK until 2000 and not shown publicly until June 2005. In the case of films shown in cinemas, local authorities have the final legal say about who can watch a particular film. However, local authorities almost always accept the BBFC's recommendation for a certificate for a film. Hence since films not rated by the BBFC cannot be shown in most cinemas, lack of BBFC approval generally makes productions of such films uneconomic.

== Video ==
By 1982, most pornographic films were being shot on the cheaper and more convenient medium of videotape. The technology change happened quickly and completely when directors realised that continuing to shoot on film was no longer a profitable option. This change moved the films out of the cinemas and into people's private homes. This was the end of the age of big budget productions and the mainstreaming of pornography. It soon went back to its earthy roots and expanded to cover every fetish possible since filming was now so inexpensive. Instead of hundreds of pornographic films being made each year, thousands now were, including compilations of just the sex scenes from various videos.

The 1977 softcore sex comedy film Come Play with Me, which had been highly successful commercially at the cinema, became one of the first British films to sell in large numbers on the new VHS format. In 1979 Paul Raymond launched the Electric Blue series of softcore videos, a range which was produced until the mid-1990s. They were an extension of his magazine publishing into new media. An Electric Blue special VHS video, A Night at the Revuebar (1983), included extensive footage of the 1980s version of The Festival of Erotica show from the Raymond Revuebar. Meanwhile, in the early eighties John Lindsay began selling compilations of his hardcore films on video through mail order, taking advantage of the then unregulated state of the British video industry. Another director to take advantage of this unregulated period was Mike Freeman, who in 1979 set up the hardcore video production company Videx Ltd. and employed Lindsay Honey as an actor. Honey went on run his own mail order hardcore video business with his partner Linzi Drew until the pair were convicted in 1992. During the 1990s and 2000s, Honey used the name Ben Dover to produce and direct gonzo pornography videos. Another successful producer of pornographic videos at this time was Viv Thomas. He began producing pornographic videos in the 1980s, moving into producing hardcore material exclusively once doing so became legal in 1999. Thomas has become known as an established producer of lesbian pornography and with a reputation for producing artistic pornographic films with an emphasis on high production values. Female directors include Tanya Hyde, who began as a hardcore actor in the mid-1990s and since 2004 has been a prolific director of hardcore fetish titles for the British pornographic film production company Harmony Films.

The Video Recordings Act 1984 (VRA) required the BBFC to censor all video works before release. Under the act, almost all video recordings must be classified by an authority chosen by the Home Secretary. This classification is then legally binding. Since the introduction of the Act, the BBFC has been the chosen authority. Since films not rated by the BBFC cannot be distributed as videos or DVDs, lack of BBFC approval generally makes productions of such films uneconomic. After 1984 videotape sellers were more likely to be prosecuted under the VRA rather than the Obscene Publications Act. The VRA requires that all videos must have a certificate from the BBFC. If the BBFC refuses a certificate a video is effectively banned for home viewing, but not necessarily in the cinema. As a result, the UK became one of the few democratic countries where the sale of explicit pornography on video (and later DVD) was illegal. Home videotape was a booming market and it was relatively simple for individuals to smuggle hardcore material in from Europe or the United States, where it had been purchased legally, either for personal use or to copy it for distribution. This resulted in a considerable black market of poor quality videotapes.

While the authorities did their best to stay on top of illegal pornography they found that juries, while not particularly liking the material, were reluctant to convict defendants where the material was intended for private use among consenting adults. Finally, in 2000, following the dismissal of a test case brought by the BBFC, hardcore pornography was effectively legalised, subject to certain conditions and licensing restrictions. It is still an offence to sell obscene material by mail order.

BBFC guidelines have subsequently been relaxed to allow the limited distribution of hardcore pornography under an R18 certificate. This is intended to provide a classification for works that are within Obscene Publications Act 1959, but exceed what the BBFC considers acceptable for its 18 certificate. Anything deemed likely to contravene the Act is prohibited from DVDs awarded an R18 certificate. A list of the categories of material most commonly prosecuted under the Act is published by the Crown Prosecution Service. In practice, this means that the R18 certificate is mainly used for hardcore pornography. The BBFC continues to demand cuts of any material it believes breaches the provisions of the Obscene Publications Act or any other legislation. In 2009, 2% of cinema films had material cut, and 3.6% of videos. Most cuts occur in videos rated for 18 or R18, rather than videos intended for viewing by under-18s. In 2009, 16.8% of 18 videos, and 27.3% of R18 videos, had material cut.

== Sex shops ==
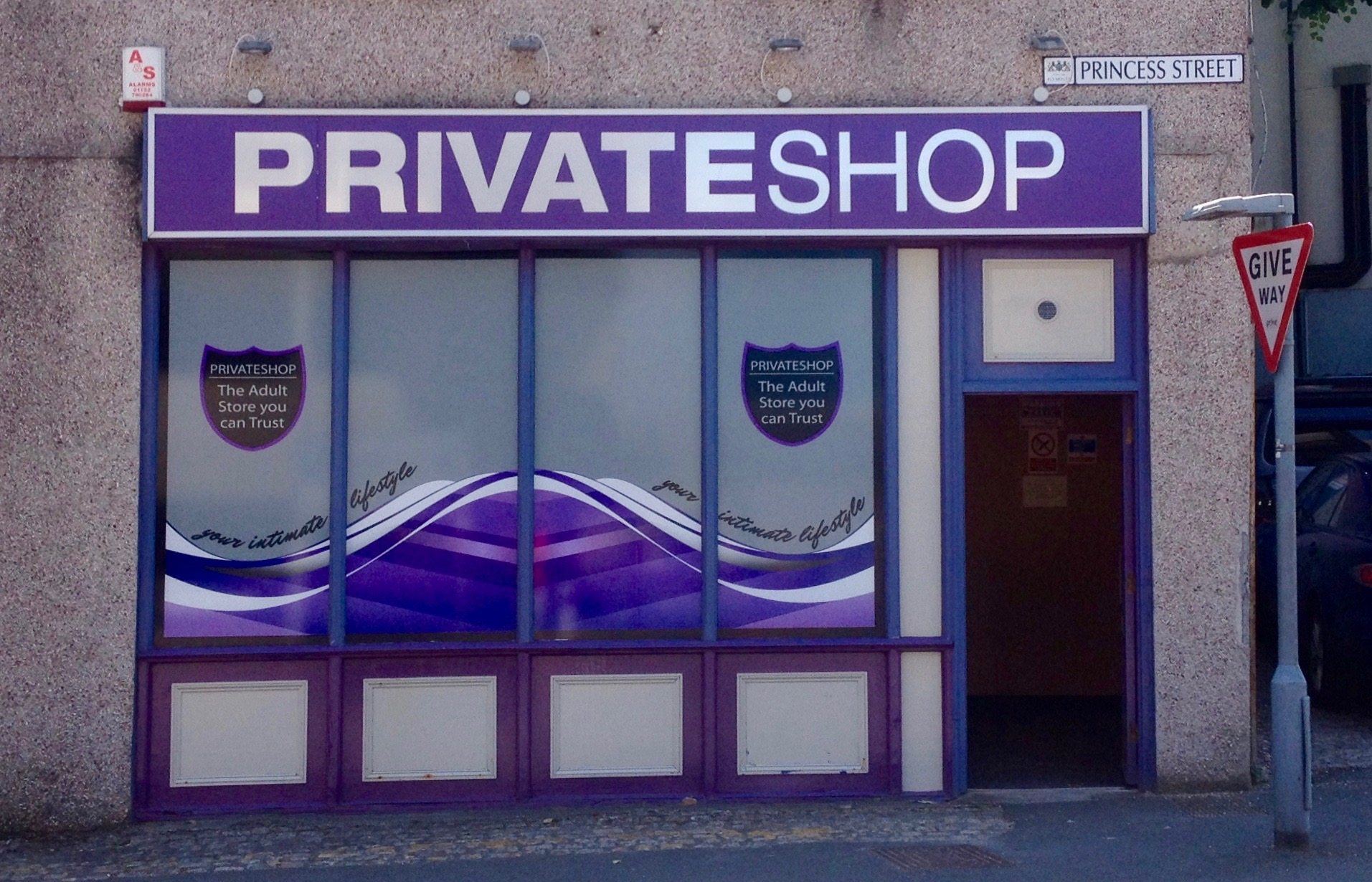
A licensed sex shop in Plymouth, Devon in 2018, with its shop windows rendered opaque to comply with the Indecent Displays Act 1981

Traditional outlets for the sale of pornography include newsagents' shops and mail order, but another route for is via licensed sex shops. A handful of sex shops were opened by Carl Slack in the London district of Soho in the early 1960s, and by the mid-seventies the number had grown to 59. Some had nominally "secret" backrooms selling hardcore photographs and novels, including Olympia Press editions. Concerns about the visual impact of sex shops on the High Street resulted in the Cinematograph and Indecent Displays Bill in 1973, which failed to become law due to the change of government in 1974. In 1978, David Sullivan opened his chain of Private Shops across Britain. However, the introduction of the Indecent Displays Act 1981 required licensed sex shops to clearly show a warning sign at the entrance to the shop and prevented them from displaying their wares in their shop windows. The Local Government (Miscellaneous Provisions) Act 1982 provided new and tighter licensing controls for sex shops and, along with the purges of the police force that took place during the 1980s, reduced the number of unlicensed premises. The Video Recordings Act 1984 introduced the R18-rated classification for videos that are only available in licensed sex shops. No sex shop customer can be under eighteen years old. The Indecent Displays Act is still in force, and as a result the fronts of sex shops are often boarded up or covered in posters, though in some cases lingerie, non-offensive covers of adult material, etc. may be shown in the shop windows depending on the licence conditions of the local authority. Section 3 of the Obscene Publications Act allows the police to seize obscene material under warrant and take it to the nearest magistrate to be destroyed. This is preferred to a trial by police and defendants alike, and seizures are seldom contested.

== Television ==
The introduction of cable television and satellite television in the UK in the 1990s allowed the development of pornographic television channels. Some channels are free-to-air while others are encrypted part or all of the time. The introduction of encryption allowed a reduction in piracy and the broadcasting of material that would not be permitted on unencrypted television. Nevertheless, a majority of the content broadcast has been softcore pornography to satisfy the regulator Ofcom and it is not permitted to show an erect penis or penetrative sex on television.

In January 1992, Home Video Channel started a pornographic television channel called The Adult Channel, a cable- and satellite-delivered subscription service that featured cable-TV versions of adult movies. The Adult Channel was available to approximately 2 million cable households and approximately 4 million Direct-To-Home (DTH) satellite households in the United Kingdom. The channel received a warning from the Independent Television Commission in 1994 for transmitting illegally in unencrypted form. After 1 May 1999 the Adult Channel changed its focus from pornographic films to diverse pornographic content, and was subsequently acquired by Playboy Enterprises. As of 2017 the channel was still in operation.

In 1995 two competing pornographic channels were launched. The first was Television X- The Fantasy Channel which was launched by Portland TV (at the time a subsidiary of Northern & Shell) in June 1995. Much of the original programming was developed by Deric Botham, then editor of Penthouse magazine. The company subsequently launched several additional pornographic TV channels. The second pornographic channel to launch in 1995 was Playboy TV UK which started broadcasting in November of that year.

Some companies took to broadcasting from other European Union countries in order to take advantage of their less restrictive regulatory regimes regarding sexual content. Red Hot Dutch, TV Erotica and Rendez-Vous all operated in this way in the mid-1990s. Access to the channels was curtailed when the UK Government made it an offence to sell their smart cards in the UK and to advertise or publish information about their services.

In 2000, Portland TV launched a series of UK-based pornographic TV channels called Red Hot. The various channels subsequently changed their names, closed and relaunched several times. In 2003 Portland TV launched two sister channels to Television X on the Sky UK satellite platform, with a third launching in 2007. Northern and Shell sold Portland TV in 2016. In March 2017 the remaining channels using the Red Hot brand were renamed Xrated.

During the 2000s adult chat television channels became popular. These are broadcast live from a studio and usually feature female presenters advertising a phone sex line at a premium rate, through which callers can talk to the woman they see on the screen. The first of these was Babestation in 2002, followed by Babecast in 2003 and Live XXX TV in 2004. Television X began airing a show using this format, TVX Callgirls Live, in 2005. Another such channel, Babeworld, was fined in 2006 and 2007 and had its licence revoked in 2011. Live XXX TV closed in 2009 with Sex Station, a televised-sex-line show that was one of its major programs, becoming a stand-alone website.

In 2004, a pornographic satellite channel called Xplicit XXX owned by Digital Television Production was fined £50,000 by Ofcom for broadcasting hardcore pornography before the 9:00 pm watershed. In February 2005, Playboy TV was fined by Ofcom for broadcasting "Sandy Babe Abroad", a hardcore pornographic film. Ofcom said "it includes material which should not be transmitted at any time under any circumstance on British television". In 2009, the station was once again fined by Ofcom for breaches of its licence, by broadcasting "sexually explicit material unencrypted". In January 2013, it was fined again for failing to protect children from potentially harmful pornographic material. Ofcom said that there was not a system in place on Playboy's on-demand programmes services and they did not have "acceptable controls in place to check that users were aged 18 or over".

Playboy One, a free-to-air satellite television channel was launched in November 2005, the only permanently free-to-air television station operated by Playboy Enterprises. It was originally a general entertainment and so was located far away from the main Playboy TV channel. The aim of Playboy One was to encourage viewers to subscribe to the pay-per-view Playboy TV channel, operating on the same satellite service. Playboy One later moved near to the main Playboy TV channel and started to air some softcore pornographic programming. Despite a low profile, it steadily increased its ratings. It was, however, closed in 2008 and was replaced with Paul Raymond TV which broadcast softcore pornographic videos from www.paulraymond.com. The channel later changed its name to My Ex-Girlfriends.

GAYtv was an encrypted subscription channel launched in 2004 and targeted at gay men. Until 2007 it was the only gay adult channel on the Sky platform. The channel ceased broadcasting in April 2011 being replaced with another Portland TV channel, Flirt TV. The channel continues to operate on Virgin TV's on-demand service alongside other defunct adult channels.

== Phone sex lines ==
Phone sex lines appeared in the UK in the 1980s using premium-rate telephone numbers for adult services with sexual content, with many of the lines playing tape recordings. The prefixes used at the time included the well-known 0891 and 0898. The phone sex market is closely linked to the pornographic magazine market, and advertising for such services often provides a vital element of a magazine's revenue. Up to a quarter of the page length of some magazines may be devoted to such advertisements. Advertising in newspapers, which had been common in the 1980s, was ended as a result of regulatory changes in 1994 which restricted advertisements to top-shelf adult magazines. At the same time rules were introduced requiring the user to pro-actively opt-in by requesting a pin number. This dramatically reduced the number of calls, and the proportion of the income generated by premium-rate telephone numbers which was associated with adult services fell from 18% in 1992 to 1% in 1996. Telephone numbering reform in the late 1990s led to 09 numbers being designated as premium rate, and numbers starting 098 have since been reserved for adult services, along with "legacy" numbers starting 0908 and 0909. The industry's regulatory body PhonepayPlus (formerly ICSTIC) monitors and enforces specific community standards in terms of content and price for premium rate numbers.

== Internet ==
During the 1990s the advent of the Internet made it easier than ever for people in the UK to access hardcore material. By the 2000s, the diverse range of pornography from across the world could be accessed, rather than simply the material that could be published legally in the UK or smuggled into the country. Governments became concerned about the situation and began to consider possible forms of internet censorship. The Byron Review (2008) and the Bailey Review (2011) were commissioned by two successive governments, in part to investigate concerns over the possibility of people aged under 18 viewing Internet pornography. The Obscene Publications Act, which is still in force, makes it illegal for websites that can be accessed from the UK without age restriction to contain certain types of adult content.

A number of steps have been taken to restrict access to pornography online:

=== Extreme pornography ===
Calls for violent adult pornography sites to be shut down began in 2003, after the murder of Jane Longhurst by Graham Coutts, a man who said he had an obsession with Internet pornography. Jane Longhurst's mother and sister also campaigned to tighten laws regarding pornography on the Internet. In response, in August 2005, the Government announced that it planned to criminalise private possession of what the Government now termed "extreme pornography". This was defined as real or simulated examples of certain types of sexual violence as well as necrophilia and bestiality. The passing of the Criminal Justice and Immigration Act 2008 resulted in the possession of "extreme pornographic images" becoming illegal in England and Wales as of January 2009. In 2019 the laws concerning extreme pornography were relaxed. The depiction of fetishes such as BDSM and humiliation is no longer likely to be prosecuted, provided the production is consensual and no harm is caused thereby, and the depiction does not promote criminality and is not aimed at minors.

=== Web blocking ===
Pornography is one of the types of content blocked by the Internet filtering systems used by UK Internet Service Providers (ISPs). Since the end of 2013 a programme of applying filtering to new ISP customers has been in place, and this has been extended to existing users on a rolling basis. A voluntary code of practice agreed by all four major ISPs means that customers have to 'opt out' of the ISP filtering to gain access to the blocked content. The range of content blocked by ISPs can be varied over time.

=== Video on demand ===
The Audiovisual Media Services Regulations 2014 require that the online streaming of videos (known as Video on demand or VOD) in the UK conforms to the BBFC R18 certificate regulations which had previously only restricted those sold in licensed sex shops. Prior to the regulations coming into force, neither Ofcom nor the British Board of Film Classification (BBFC) had jurisdiction over such content. The UK regulator of VOD is now Ofcom, which replaced ATVOD as the regulator from the beginning of 2016. During its tenure as regulator ATVOD regularly instructed pornographic websites based in the UK to comply with its rules, and failure to do so often resulted in Ofcom issuing a fine or shutting down a website.

=== Age verification ===
With the passing of the Digital Economy Act 2017, the United Kingdom became the first country to pass a law containing a legal mandate on the provision of age verification. Under the act, websites that publish pornography on a commercial basis would have been required to implement a "robust" age verification system. The British Board of Film Classification (BBFC) was charged with enforcing this legislation. After a series of setbacks, the planned scheme was eventually abandoned in 2019. The new rules have affected all websites, including social media like Reddit, Bluesky, Discord and X, platforms and apps to use Age verification by 25 July 2025 to comply with Online Safety Act 2023.

== See also ==
- Outline of British pornography
- List of British pornographic actors
- Anti-pornography movement in the United Kingdom
- Backlash
- Campaign Against Censorship
- Feminists Against Censorship
- National Campaign for the Reform of the Obscene Publications Acts

== Bibliography ==
- Hyde, H. Montgomery (1964). A History of Pornography. London: Heinemann.
