= Adult chat (television) =

Genre of television programming

Adult chat television channels and programs (also known as babe channels or babeshows) are a format of phone-in live television programming that has developed in Europe since 2002, often having elements similar to webcam modelling and softcore pornography.

Adult chat channels were noted in Screen as "challenges to conventional notions" of television – viewers can make premium-rate phone calls to the channel's presenters, but the calls are not heard on screen during the program. Thus, the channels' format and content is openly influenced by the pursuit of revenue, "pay-to-participate", without the traditional "audience subscription, advertising or sponsorship".

Broadcast live from a studio, the shows usually feature female presenters advertising a phone sex line or chat line, speaking on the phone, promoting extra online content and photos, or responding to viewers' online messages, text messages and photos.

== Formats ==
Many adult chat programs have been established in mainland Europe (mainly on Hot Bird) and in the United Kingdom (mainly on Sky) since the beginning of SexySat TV and Babestation in 2002. These programs and channels mainly aim for profits drawn from phone calls, at the expense of production values, which are rarely high. The presenters of the shows are often glamour models, fetish models or porn stars, and have included Cathy Barry and Dani Thompson.

Some eventual channels began as shorter shows on unrelated TV stations; for example, Babestation was initially a 2-hour phone-in on Game Network. Some babe channels broadcast for part of the day, and some for 24 hours a day. A typical night show, when content is more sexually explicit, may run from 9pm or 10pm until 5.30am (in the UK). Many of the same channels also run daytime shows. Adult chat companies have also operated various extra online streams and web shows.

== Analysis ==
While television usually "address[es] itself to an overhearing audience", babe channels were noted in Screen as "challenges to conventional notions" of television" due to their novel format, which prioritises revenue from phone calls that are seen but unheard in the broadcast. As well as this, Stephanie Marriott identified the channels' promise of a "fully bilateral engagement" with the host as an unusual idea in television. De Montfort University professor of film studies, I.Q. Hunter, names adult chat television as representative of how "commercialised erotic representation" changed radically in the digital age.

The rise of adult chat was linked to that of similar "participation television" programs, quiz, psychic and dating channels in the early 21st century. An independent Ofcom report highlighted the contradiction in the nature of the channels: "'Babe' TV was treated as 'advertising' by non-viewers but among viewers it was felt to provide engaging programming that could be enjoyed without calling in." According to viewers, "All respondents implied that the purpose of watching or calling 'Babe' channels was normally sexual gratification, although the channels were also seen as entertaining or amusing."

Photographer Bronia Stewart spoke of the good relationship between presenters and producers, after a nine-month photography project at Babestation as part of the 2013 art exhibition, FreshFaced + WildEyed. She said she was surprised that the hosts' motivation was less about fame and "more about a working life. So while some of them had 20,000 followers on Twitter, it was about being able to provide for their family and earn good money." Stewart also described babe channels as sympomatic of the media's sexualisation of women, and said many of the presenters have changed their bodies seeking to become "the perceived ideal woman".

=== Experiences ===
Among the presenters working on the channels, Rebecca Emslie talked about the shows' environment: "To be honest I really didn't find it competitive at all. I think every channel I have worked for had their favourites but we all used to get along it wasn't bitchy or anything like that! It was a relaxed, fun environment."

Sports broadcaster and writer Amy Christophers said the channels, where she used to present, contributed to many men's unrealistic expectations about women. Former producer Kathryn Vinclaire said the channels were not as she had expected: "It was a world entirely led by the girls on camera, and they were always in complete control." A former office runner on a babeshow said he wouldn't recommend that job as a way of starting out in TV.

== Controversy ==
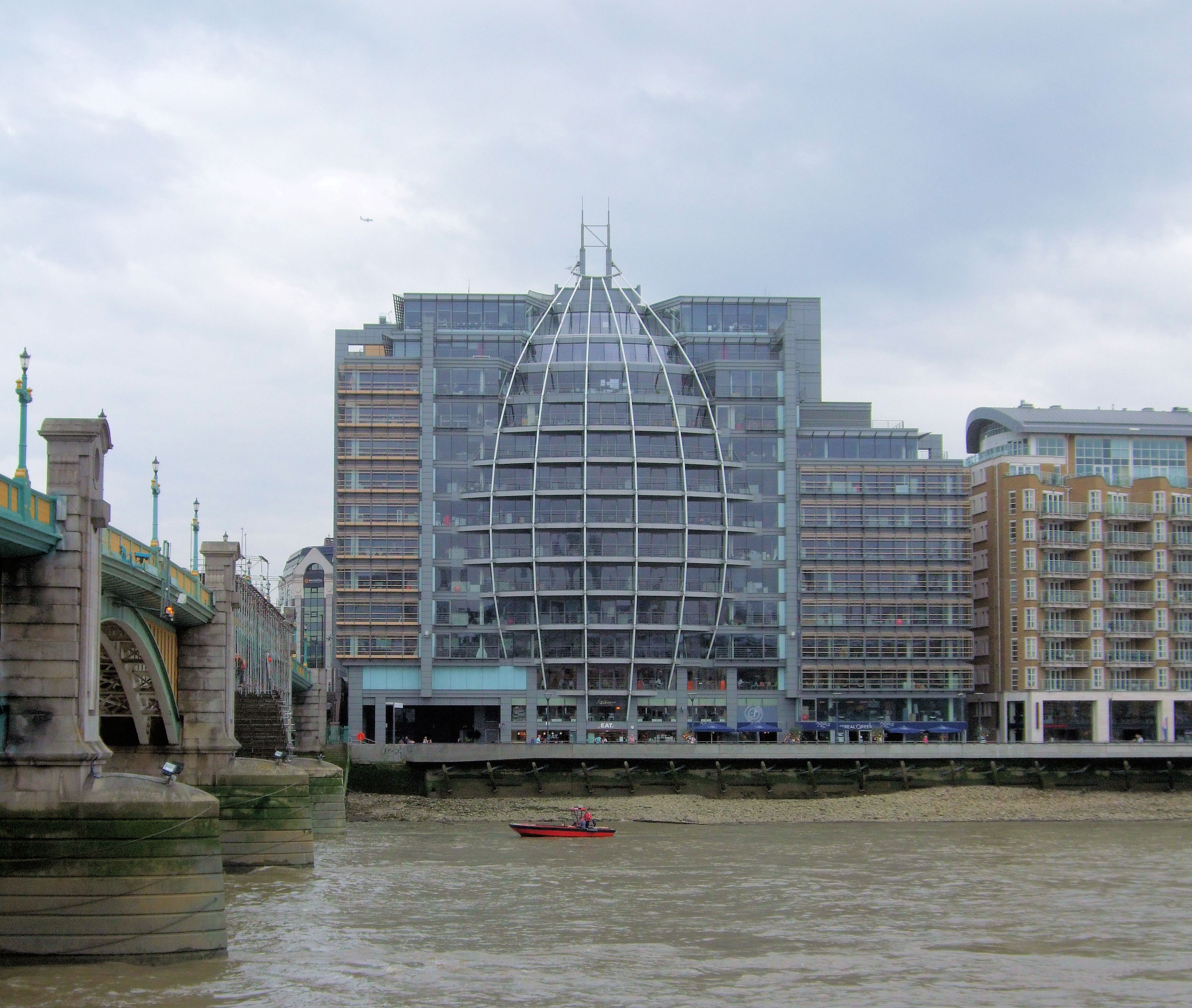
Ofcom headquarters in Bankside, London

In the UK, Ofcom classes TV programs that encourage viewers to call presenters live on a premium rate telephone number as advertisements. The regulations applicable to advertisements apply to these channels, rather than the rules for editorial content. This restricts what may be said and shown on-air on unencrypted channels more stringently than if the content were a normal program. However, regulation of adult TV channels has not been devolved to the Advertising Standards Authority. Ofcom regulates these channels directly.

Adult chat channels have periodically been fined or punished by regulators. In 2006, ICSTIS fined a variety of daytime chat line service providers for breaches of phone line regulations.

In 2008 in Austria, Eurotic TV parent company Franz Ressl Handels GmbH was criticised by the KOA regulator for broadcasting nudity on its daytime programs.

In 2010, Bang Media were fined £157,250 by Ofcom for screening "inappropriate explicit material" with "manifest recklessness" in the UK.

In 2013, the UK Babestation switched to a channel license in the Netherlands, which led Ofcom to make a formal complaint to the Dutch regulator.

== History ==
=== 1995 ===
In the US, Playboy TV started Night Calls, a phone-in show where viewers could 'direct' the presenters (all female porn stars) in sexual acts on the air. However, this was not quite the format established later in Europe, where the focus is more on the phone calls, and profit made from them.

=== 2002 ===
- December 3: Babestation was first broadcast from 11pm-1am on Game Network UK, initially with a show host and two other presenters.
- SexySat TV began in the Netherlands, broadcasting from 14:00 to 02:00. According to Interia Biznes, "It probably started in December 2002 (the first mentions of tests in the satkurier.pl news archive come from early January 2003)."

=== 2003 ===
- Other programs such as Babecast (on Friendly TV, UK) and Fast Girls (Motors TV UK) began in late-night timeslots. These were usually on channel nos 150–250 on the Sky EPG, and gradually became more daring in portraying nudity and masturbation (although they were by no means hardcore).
- Babestation's running time was extended to include a "late babe" hour, with only one girl taking calls on full screen; to avoid the conversation being heard by viewers, background music was played, as continues to be the case on other programs.

=== 2004 ===
In the UK:

- A number of the "true" or dedicated adult channels (whose channel no. was around 900, such as Live XXX TV) started to run up to 2½ hours of free-to-view live phone-ins, encouraging viewers to sign up to the subscription for the channel, before becoming encrypted. Then, the porn stars from the earlier show would engage in acts including oral sex, and use dildos.

Outside the UK:

- August 4: SexySat TV moved from the Netherlands to Prague, Czech Republic, which reduced the explicitness of broadcasts.
- August: Diva Futura went on-the-air in Italy.
- October 22: Eurotic TV began in Austria, with production site and models based in Sofia, Bulgaria. Its role was "to sell subscriptions for encrypted channels including Inxtc.tv and Xplus tv".

=== 2006 ===
- By this time, Game Network had allowed Babestation (and other profitable non video game-related programs like Psychic Interactive) to dominate its schedule. On February 20, Game Network ceased to exist, and the channel was renamed "Babestation". On February 28, Sky moved all adult or predominantly-adult channels to channel nos 900–970, so all channels showing late-night babe shows are now alongside established adult channels such as Television X.
- During the daytime, some channels show teleshopping or quiz channels, while many of the newly moved channels decided to start showing "softer" daytime babe shows, with some of the same presenters as at night (e.g., Babedate). They still take premium-rate phone calls, but usually wear bikinis (and keep them on), and cannot make sexual gyrations.
- Television X's TVX Callgirls Live became the first "babe show" to introduce male porn stars on-screen. They co-presented a free-to-view preview for two hours, with an alternating female presenter (two other girls take calls), then, in the live finale for subscribing viewers, had sex with one of the female presenters on air after encryption.
- November 9: ICSTIS fined a variety of daytime chat line service providers for breaches of phone line regulations – LiveLines UK Ltd, who ran daytime show Housebabes Live (and Office Babe and Hospital Reception until September 28, 2006) were fined a total of £85,000; Datapro Services Ltd, £3,000 for Office Babe; Com & Tel Ltd, £25,000 (lowered after appeal) and 2ergo, £5,000, for Babedate and Mobibabes; and Eckoh Technologies, £10,000 for Babeworld (daytime version, which still contained sexually-explicit phone conversations).
- November 24: British television regulator Ofcom imposed a £175,000 fine on Look4Love, owners of Babestar TV. In 2006, Babestar had become one of the most explicit free-to-view nighttime channels, containing use of sex toys and oral sex between female presenters, although the content could still just be considered "softcore". Ofcom's problem was actually with Babestar's concentration on the "barely-legal" status of an 18-year-old presenter.

=== 2007 ===
- SportXXXbabes and House of Fun TV introduced 'live pixelisation' – blurring of a part of the screen. This allowed them to feature explicit content (masturbation and oral sex between presenters) without breaking rules, because aroused genitals were not seen.
- February: House Of Fun TV also introduced Boys Next Door, the first all-male gay porn on a British adult chat program, broadcast only twice (on Tuesday nights). This featured simulated anal sex, and (pixelised) real masturbation and oral sex between three male presenters.

=== 2008 ===
- The websites of Babestation, Babecast and Sex Station began to simulcast content. Although most of this was repeated material previously televised on Sex Station, there was also the introduction of a daytime webcast from 11:00 until 20:30, with sexually-explicit content and language that would be too strong to be televised, featuring up to three female presenters.
- 3G technology was introduced to adult chat channels, which allows some presenters to see some of the callers who are talking to them.

=== 2011 ===
- Sex Station extended its web show to 24 hours a day. As of 2017, Sex Station had since ceased trading.

=== 2013 ===
- UK Babestation obtained a channel licence in Netherlands, leading Ofcom to make a formal complaint to the Dutch regulator.

=== 2017 ===
- Confusion over the UK dialling code caused Irish viewers to accidentally call residents in Westport, County Mayo using the Babestation phone number. Some of the show's presenters travelled to Westport to apologise in person.

=== 2019 ===
- Studio 66 TV was cautioned by Ofcom for sexualised content in daytime broadcasts.

== Daytime chat lines ==
=== Austria ===
Eurotic TV, a channel operating under an Austrian licence on Astra and Hotbird, had been allowed to broadcast large amounts of female nudity, softcore porn and moderate sexual content with female models from 2004 to 2009. Regulations forced the channel to remove nudity from its daytime shows in May 2009. Thereafter the adult program began at 11 pm CET and lasted until 3 am. The channel closed in 2016.

=== United Kingdom ===
During the daytime, most Sky adult channels broadcast "chat line" or "date line" programs, where viewers can call female presenters, still at the premium rate, but rarely including sexual content or conversation so they cannot be classed as "sex lines". As of 2019, many daytime programs featured extra online camera angles. The presenters are sometimes the same as on nighttime sex lines; some made the 'transition' from daytime to nighttime.

During the 2010s, the 8–9 pm hour (before the watershed) featured fewer phone-ins on the adult channels.

== List of adult chat broadcasts ==
=== Australia ===
Channel	Show title	Format
Extra (Nine Network)	Babe TV: Live	On air in 2012. Included UK adult chat presenters Karina Currie and Sasperella as hosts

=== Austria ===
Channel	Satellite	Format
Eurotic TV	Astra 1H; Hot Bird 3 Hot Bird 6	Founded 2004, confirmed as on air early 2005. Included explicit daytime programs until 2009. Initially founded to promote the INXTC television service. Broadcast from 2005 to 2016

=== Brazil ===
Channel	Show title	Format
TV Terra Viva (Band Internacional)	Babestation Brasil	On air in 2012 and 2013
TV Terra Viva, Programa 41	Azaração Sexy	On air July–August 2014; With Babestation Brasil host Gabi Levinnt

=== Colombia ===
Channel	Show title	Format
Contacto Sensual	Contacto Sensual	On air in 2013

=== Czech Republic ===
Channel	Satellite	Format
SexySat TV	Astra 1H; Hot Bird 3 Hot Bird 6	The first adult chat channel in mainland Europe; Founded in December 2002
FullX4Free / ALLOVE TV	Hot Bird 3	Broadcast from Czech Republic via transmitter in Netherlands; Established Feb 2006; changed name Nov 2007. Ended in (European) autumn 2008

=== France ===
Channel	Show title	Format
Canal Star (Canal 160)	Sex Station (France)	Began broadcasting (from London?) February 2006; Featured Nina Roberts as a presenter Had a Dailymotion videos page Made the reality show La future Star with Roberts; No longer running

=== Germany ===
Channel	Satellite	Format
Red Lips TV	Internet; 3A TV (Astra 1H), DHD24	Broadcast first on internet, and occasionally TV; Features some former Eurotic TV models
Babestation24	Astra 1N, Astra 1M	Began in 2011 based in Switzerland. Became a standalone channel in 2013

=== Italy ===
Channel	Satellite	Format
SexyChannel TV	Hot Bird	Broadcast 2006–2007, replaced by Eros Live recorded shows
Sensuality TV	Hot Bird	Started in 2006, broadcasting 14:00–03:00. Now defunct
Diva Futura; Diva Futura Plus	Hot Bird	Company has existed since 1983; Founded by Ilona Staller & Riccardo Schicchi; Original channel began August 2004; Diva Futura Plus began September 1, 2006

=== Netherlands ===
Defunct:

Channel	Satellite	Format
SexySat TV	Hot Bird	December 2002 – 4 August 2004; Moved to Prague
FullX4Free / ALLOVE TV	Hot Bird 3	Broadcast from Czech Republic via transmitter in Netherlands; Established Feb 2006; changed name Nov 2007. Ended in (European) autumn 2008

=== United Kingdom ===
Some channels have included (past or present):

- On Sky:

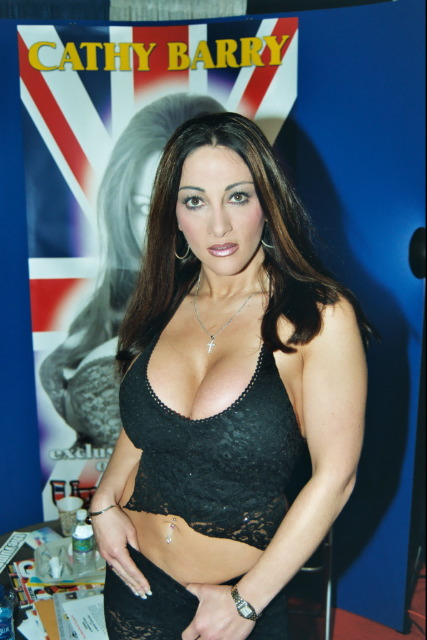
Model and adult actress Cathy Barry, a presenter on Bang Babes and Red Light Central

Channel (no.)	Show title	Format
Adult Channel (901)	Chat Girl TV	6am-10pm, 3 or 4 girls rotating, presenting varied sets with themes
Babestation (906)	Babestation	1 or 2 girls rotating, presenting Split-screen
Friendly TV (907)	Bang Babes	As Babestation
Babeworld TV (908); Babeworld XXXtra (949)	Babeworld	3 or 4 girls presenting All on same bed
Get Lucky TV (909)	Babestation 2	As Babestation
Lucky Star (910)	Sex Station (formerly LiveXXX)	2 or 3 girls taking calls on same bed Rotating with XXX 4 U'; Sometimes features "strips" if enough viewers text
Tease Me (912); Tease Me 2 (948)	Bangbabes	2 girls taking calls on same bed
Television X4 (913); Dirty Talk (964)	TVX Callgirls	2 girls taking calls on same bed
Over 18 TV (914)	Hotel Voyeur (formerly McQueen's Angels)	4 girls taking calls on same bed
sportXXXbabes (918); Northern Birds (954)	Live & European	2 or 3 girls taking calls Formerly featured sex (pixelised) and was encrypted at 0:00
Live XXX Babes (950); Blue Kiss TV (951); The Other Side (952); Babe Central (953); Essex Babes (955)	Live XXX Babes, Real Wives Live, etc.	Female presenters taking calls
HappyHourGirlsTV (956)	Happy Hour Girls	
Studio 66 TV (912, 940, 941)	Studio 66 Nights	

On Freeview:

Channel	Show title	Format
Smile TV2 (94)	Babestation	"TV dating/chat line", runs 0:00–5:00; Features non-sexual content Viewers can talk to presenter(s); Previously, callers apparently arranged dates
Smile TV3 (95)	Partyland Live	"TV dating/chat line", runs 01:00–5:30; Features non-sexual content Viewers can talk to presenter(s)
Babestation (96)	Partyland Live	"TV dating/chat line", runs 01:00–5:30; Features non-sexual content Viewers can talk to presenter(s)
Partyland (97)	Partyland Live	"TV dating/chat line", runs 01:00–5:30; Features non-sexual content Viewers can talk to presenter(s)
Bang Babes (98)		"TV dating/chat line", runs 03:00–09:00 features non-sexual content viewers can talk to presenter(s)

Daytime chat lines:

Channel (no.)	Show title
Get Lucky TV (909)	Babestation Daytime
Babestation (906)	Masti Chat
Northern Birds (954) Essex Babes (955); SportxxxGirls (967)	Bluebird TV
Studio 66 TV (912, 940, 941)	Studio 66 Days
Lucky Star (910)	Cheeky Telly TV
Storm (966)	Storm Daytime
xxXPanded TV (931)	FlirtxChange
Red Light TV (911, 948, 950)	Red Light Lounge
Playboy TV Chat (902)	Playboy TV Chat

Defunct adult chat broadcasts:

Channel (no.)	Show title	When active	Format
Motors TV (now 413)	Fast Girls	2003	Operated from same studio as Babestation; 2 girls took calls, 1 presented Split-screen (plus text-messages)
Television X 3 (905)	TVX Callgirls Live (first incarnation)	2006	2 girls took calls, 2 presented Featured 1 male presenter on Fridays; After 23:10 encryption, they had sex Still exists on encrypted Television X (as TVX Callgirls)
Gay TV (940)		2005–06	2 male hosts presented and took calls Encrypted at 22:00
Adult Channel (901); Spice Extreme (902)	SX:TV Live	2003–?	On encrypted channels Featuring already-famous porn stars (usually all girls); More explicit content, Released on DVD as SXTV Live Volume 1 SX:TV Live at IMDb
You TV 2 (913)	XXX 4 U	2006–07	1 girl from Sex Station taking calls Not to be confused with DVD retailer XXX4U
You TV 2 Extra (914)	XXX 4 U	2006–07	Always simulcast with You TV 2 The channel no longer exists
Babestar+ (960)	Babestar XXX	c 2006–07	2 girls taking calls on same bed
House of Fun TV (949)	Just Girly, Boys Next Door	c 2007–08	2 or 3 presenters (all female or all male) taking calls Also featured sex and masturbation (pixelised)
