= Outline of British pornography =

This is a list of topics related to pornography in the United Kingdom.

== Legislation ==
- Obscene Publications Acts
- Video Recordings Act 1984
- Section 63 of the Criminal Justice and Immigration Act 2008
- Audiovisual Media Services Regulations 2014
- Digital Economy Act 2017
- Online Safety Act 2023

== Regulation ==
- British Board of Film Classification
  - X-rated
  - R18 certificate
- Phone-paid Services Authority (formerly PhonepayPlus)

== Pornography channels ==
- The Adult Channel
- Babestation
- Babeworld
- GAYtv
- Playboy One
- Television X

== Television shows ==
- Babestation
- Babeworld
- Electric Blue (TV series)
- Sex Station
- TVX Callgirls Live

== Film directors ==
- Anna Span
- Ben Dover
- Jasper Duncombe, 7th Baron Feversham
- John Jesnor Lindsay
- Keiran Lee
- Mark Davis
- Taylor Wane
- Viv Thomas

== Awards ==
- Sexual Freedom Awards
- SHAFTA Awards
- UK Adult Film and Television Awards

== Magazine publishers ==
- Paul Raymond
- David Sullivan
- Richard Desmond
- Russell Gay
- Harrison Marks

== Magazines ==
- Mayfair
- Knave
- Men Only
- Club International
- Escort
- Filament
- Razzle
- Fiesta
- Forum
- Asian Babes
- Men's World
- Daily Sport/Sunday Sport (newspapers)
