= Babes and Brazzers =

British adult television channel

Ownership
- Owner: Aylo Global Entertainment (Europe) Limited
- Sister channels: Adult Channel; Climax; Television X TVX 40+ XXX Girl Girl

History
- Launched: 1 October 2008
- Replaced: Playboy One
- Former names: Paul Raymond TV; Top Shelf TV (to 2011); My Ex-Girlfriends (until 30 November 2017)

Babes and Brazzers is an adult pay-per-view television channel owned by Aylo Global Entertainment (Europe) Limited, a subsidiary of the international adult entertainment conglomerate Aylo. Babes and Brazzers broadcasts pornographic content, and is part of the international division of the Spice Networks owned by Aylo. The network originally launched as Paul Raymond TV in October 2008, and has since changed its name multiple times.

== History ==
Logo as Top Shelf TV

The channel launched on 1 October 2008 as Paul Raymond TV, replacing the free-to-air network Playboy One. In contrast to its predecessor, Paul Raymond TV was an encrypted station which broadcast hard core pornographic videos that were also available on the Paul Raymond website, paulraymond.com. Encrypted content was broadcast from 10:00pm to 5:30am, with ten-minute free views appearing at the beginning of every hour. The pre-watershed slot aired an adult chat programme and content from Elite TV was broadcast during the first post-watershed hour starting at 9:00pm.

In August 2009, the channel was renamed Top Shelf TV, with no changes in its programming. On 2 September 2009, Top Shelf TV was added to Virgin Media channel 478, replacing Spice Extreme. On 4 March 2011, the channel was rebranded again, this time as My Ex-Girlfriends.

On 30 November 2017, as part of a re-shuffle of the adult channels on Sky UK, the channel was renamed once again, becoming Babes and Brazzers, a UK version of MindGeek's existing television brands Babes TV and Brazzers TV.

On 30 September 2020, following the sale of Portland TV's assets to MG Global Entertainment, the channel moved to 903 on the Sky EPG, with all the adult networks becoming part of one bundle on Sky.

== See also ==
- List of adult television channels
- Pornography in the United Kingdom
