= UK Council for Child Internet Safety =

2008 board created by the Brown government

The UK Council for Child Internet Safety (UKCCIS) was set up in 2008 under the Brown Government charged with bringing together government departments, law enforcement agencies, academia, private industry and third-sector representatives such as charities and voluntary groups to collaborate on strategies to ensure child internet safety. It is a group made up of more than 200 constituent organisations with a board chaired by ministers. It collates internet safety research, conducts its own consultations, gives advice to industry providers and publishes a code of practice. The remit of the Council began with the Byron Review and the group has subsequently drawn on diverse sources including the Bailey Review and the work of Professor Sonia Livingstone.

== Origin ==
The Internet Crime Forum was a UK-based organisation established to develop the relationship between the internet industry, government and law enforcement to tackle Internet crime and improve confidence in Internet use. Its report made several recommendations for protecting children on the internet, including improved supervision of chat rooms and better display of safety messages. The report led in March 2001 to the formation of the Home Secretary’s Taskforce on Online Child Protection. The Taskforce brought children’s agencies together with industry, government and law enforcement to improve children's safety in using the internet.

A report published by the Culture, Media and Sport Committee on 31 July 2008 contained various recommendations among which were:

- That the structure and funding of the Home Office Task Force on Child Internet Safety should be formalised.
- That a new UK Council for Child Internet Safety should work with Internet-based industries to develop a consistent and transparent policy on take-down procedures with clear maximum times within which inappropriate material will be removed. This should be subject to independent verification and publication.

On 29 September 2008 Children's Secretary Ed Balls and Home Secretary Jacqui Smith announced the launch of UKCCIS, which was supported by organisations including Google, Yahoo, BT, Microsoft, and Facebook, and which had an initial brief to deliver a "Child Internet Safety Strategy" to Prime Minister Gordon Brown in early 2009.

The organisations were to work closely with government to deliver recommendations from the Byron Review. They were also to look at ways of improving public awareness of child safety issues online, promote responsible online advertising to children and "provide specific measures to support vulnerable children and young people, such as taking down illegal internet sites that promote harmful behaviour." In addition they were also to investigate ways and means of "tackling problems around online bullying, safer search features, and violent video games." They were also to establish a voluntary code of practise for user-generated sites such as YouTube to agree a time limit for takedown of inappropriate content.

== Click Clever, Click Safe ==
In December 2009 the Council held a "summit" meeting chaired by Professor Tanya Byron and published a strategy document concerning the internet safety of children and young people: Click Clever, Click Safe. The document set out:

- The work that the Council had done, its commitments to parents, children and young people and its plans to realise them.
- Proposals for internet companies, charities and the Government to be independently reviewed against the Council's standards.
- The launch of a "Digital Code" of conduct for internet safety (the "Zip it, Block it, Flag it" campaign) to be adopted by retailers, social networking sites, schools and charities.
- The Child Exploitation and Online Protection Centre to host a website giving internet safety advice for parents.
- Online safety to be made a compulsory part of the curriculum from age 5.
- The Byron Review to examine whether the Council was succeeding in its aims as part of its 2010 progress review.

Other activities undertaken by the Council included anti-Cyberbullying campaigning in conjunction with charities such as Beatbullying, promoting Safer Internet public awareness campaigns, and providing online safety resources for secondary school teachers.

== Internet filtering ==
Following the 2010 election, the new Coalition Government put forward proposals for default filtering of Internet pornography. In June 2012 the Council held a conference for its constituent organisations to discuss these proposals with Ministers. This was followed by a 10-week consultation held by the Council to determine views on which system should be used for the filtering. Once filtering was introduced in November 2013 there were allegations that the blocking of websites providing information for the LGBT community could breach the Equality Act 2010. It was soon realised that there were many sites which were being inadvertently blocked. These included charity-run sites whose aim was to educate children and others about health, sex education and drugs issues. The government asked the Council to set up a working group involving charities and industry to try to reduce the blocking of sex education advice for young people. The working group first met in December 2013 and involved ISPs, charities, representatives from government, the BBFC and mobile phone operators. Research was carried out on inadvertent blocking and charities were consulted to find out the degree to which the introduction filters had reduced their website visitor numbers. The working group then began constructing a whitelist of sites with the aim that the list would be shared among ISPs to ensure that the educational sites were not blocked.

== See also ==
- Cyberbullying
- Child Exploitation and Online Protection Centre
- Internet Censorship in the United Kingdom
- Web blocking in the United Kingdom
