= Sex Station =

- Programme logo, 2007
- Starring: Various
- Country of origin: United Kingdom
- Original language: English

Original release
- Release: 2006 – present

Related
- Live XXX TV

Sex Station is a pornographic British adult chat television programme. It began broadcasting in 2006 on Sky Digital at night on the Lucky Star channel (Sky 910) and the Live XXX channel. By 2013 it had ceased television broadcasting but it continues to stream content on the Internet.

== History ==
LiveXXX was a channel in Sky's Adult section, which ran free-to-air for up to 2½ hours (9:00 p.m.–11.30 p.m.) before becoming encrypted.

Gradually (between March and June 2006), LiveXXX became Sex Station, and moved from channel number 995 to 943 (possibly on 28 February 2006, the same day Babestation was moved). By July 2006, LiveXXX had been removed from channel 943. In late 2006 Sex Station's sister programme XXX 4 U began on You TV 2 (channel 913) and You TV 2 Extra (channel 914), but these closed in 2007. Normally these included presenters from Sex Station (or the same feed).

== Format ==
Sex Station was a free-to-air programme that ran from 9 p.m. to approximately 5:30 a.m. each night. Viewers were encouraged to call a premium-rate telephone number and have a sexually-explicit conversation with a female presenter on-screen – these were not usually heard by the viewers. Viewers also sent text messages and camera phone pictures of themselves.

In general, the presenters of LiveXXX remained on Sex Station; the only major change was the name and the explicitness of the content. At first, Sex Station's studio was red and black, with a television behind the presenters and the women sitting on a red plastic/rubber cover, but in 2006 the studio was changed to include a new set and neon sign. Background music included "Sex (Show Us What You Got, Girl)" and "Your Lips".

== Internet ==
By 2013, the only remaining Sex Station shows were online.

The official website, www.sexstationtv.com, was redesigned in 2007 to include photo galleries and video of Sex Station's presenters, as well as a webcam section (these are all only for subscribers).

Sex Station also had a channel of free video content (under the name "XXX4U") on Sumo TV.

Since June 2008 Sex Station has also produced a hardcore web show, 7 days a week between 11:00 p.m. and 5:30 a.m.. By February 2011, the running time had been expanded to a 24-hour continual broadcast, on Rampant.tv, where there were three Sex Station streams in December 2013.

== Porn Star Diaries ==
Porn Star Diaries was a one-off 30-minute documentary made by Sex Station's producers in 2006, featuring interviews with three female porn stars including Nina Roberts and Bobbi Eden, who then did a lesbian softcore photoshoot together. The interviewees talked about their careers (how they began in porn) and the porn industry generally.

This was broadcast in a 3-hour block at nights on You TV (channel 146, which became Sumo TV channel 879), alternating with Babestation's Meet the Babes. (A re-edited version of Bobbi Eden's interview was put online by Sex Station in 2007 on sumo.tv.)

== See also ==
- Babestation
- Pornography in the United Kingdom
