= Adult chat =

Adult chat may refer to:

- Phone sex, sexually explicit phone conversations
- Adult chat (television) channels and programs
- Adult video chat with webcam models

== See also ==
- Cybersex
- Chat room
