= SexySat TV =

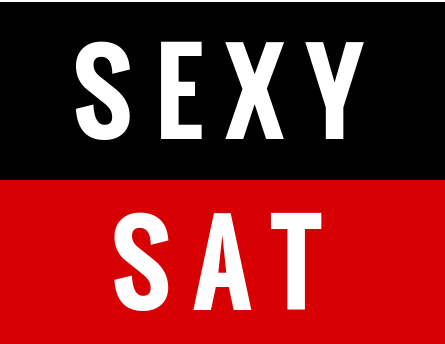
- Country: Czech Republic Netherlands Brazil

Programming
- Language(s): English

History
- Founded: 2002

SexySat TV is a softcore televised sex line, broadcasting on the Hot Bird 13B satellite.

SexySat previously had a network of three more channels on European satellite TV, including on Hot Bird 3.

== History ==
Sexysat was one of the first European erotic live-show channels. Regarding the channel's foundation, Interia Biznes gave this information: "It probably started in December 2002 (the first mentions of tests in the satkurier.pl news archive come from early January 2003)", the same month that Babestation began in the UK.

The first programmes were on a single Hot Bird satellite channel, with one female presenter taking calls in a studio in the Netherlands. According to Liveshow-tv.com, the studio was moved from the Netherlands to Bratislava, Slovakia, on 4 August 2004. In July 2005, SexySat began broadcasting on the Astra 1H satellite, available in Germany. Since these two developments, the picture and sound quality was reduced, along with explicitness allowed on shows, which prompted fans to begin a petition opposing the changes.

== Format ==
Liveshows are broadcast live 24 hours a day. (Previously this was only from 19:00 until 06:00, with repeats in-between.) Programming usually consists of a scantily clad woman, who asks viewers to call her. The ladies are mostly from the Czech Republic and neighbouring Slovakia and speak at least two foreign languages.

== Satellites ==
- Hot Bird 13B 11200 MHz, Vertical, SR 27500 kS, FEC 5/6

Defunct channel:

- SexySat TV 2: 12245 MHz, Horizontal, SR 27500 kS, FEC 3/4

== Web streams ==
There are online live streams of both SexySat TV 1 (since 2011) and also an online-only hardcore channel, XXX SexySat (since 1 December 2012). As of 2016, their websites also carry other streams of similar channels, such as Babestation.
