= The Wrestling Channel =

Former television channel in the United Kingdom and Ireland

- Country: United Kingdom & Republic of Ireland

Programming
- Language: English
- Picture format: 4:3

Ownership
- Owner: Dolphin Television; The Wrestling Channel Limited
- Sister channels: TWC Reloaded (launched October 2004, ceased March 2005)

History
- Launched: 1 December 2003: As a block on Friendly TV); 15 March 2004 (Standalone Channel)
- Closed: 1 December 2008

The TWC Fight! logo used from 2006 to 2008

The Wrestling Channel (later branded as TWC, TWC Fight! and The Fight Network) was a free-to-air digital satellite television sports channel in the United Kingdom and Ireland that existed exactly 5 years, between 1 December 2003 and 1 December 2008. Initially created to be a dedicated channel to Professional wrestling, it later rebranded as "TWC" and "TWC Fight!" and incorporated both Mixed Martial Arts and Boxing.

== History ==
=== Pre-launch ===
The Fight Network UK began its run as The Wrestling Channel. The service was planned to launch as a full channel in March 2004, but began test-transmissions on 1 December 2003, as a temporary programming block on the now-defunct channel Friendly TV. This block aired from 7:00 to 8:00 in the daytime and evening on weekdays with repeats on weekend mornings from 9 to 11:00 am, and 6:00 pm. The block featured Wrestling promotions such as Classic Wrestling, Pro Wrestling Noah, Ring of Honor and Total Nonstop Action Wrestling, which would be the first time these promotions would ever air on a UK channel. The block was supposed to only last a month, but was extended in 2004 due to positive response from viewers.

=== Launch ===
On 15 March 2004, the channel fully launched on Sky Channel 427. The Wrestling Channel was the second channel of its kind in the world to strictly focus its programming on professional wrestling. Alongside shows that aired on the block on Friendly TV, shows from promotions such as New Japan Pro-Wrestling, Pro-Pain-Pro Wrestling as well as vintage British wrestling from World of Sport and related ITV programming.. To promote the launch, the channel's parent company partnered up with game publisher Acclaim Entertainment and their then-upcoming game Showdown: Legends of Wrestling for a competition. In July 2004, The Wrestling Channel also became the first channel to air a news/talk show dedicated to pro-wrestling - titled The Bagpipe Report.

=== TWC Reloaded ===
On 25 October 2004, a sister channel called TWC Reloaded was launched next to The Wrestling Channel on Sky channel 428. The channel featured action from the existing TWC library and also experimented with new shows and formats. There were plans for Reloaded to air MMA programmes but this never came to fruition.

On 24 January 2005, The Wrestling Channel's parent company announced that the TWC Reloaded slot had been approached by a number of potential partners seeking to re-programme and develop the slot. Future output had been reduced to the minimum level of three hours per day, starting at 3:00 am, whilst a decision was taken over the content for the slot. From 1 March, a movie aired nightly on the channel and 2 days later, the channel effectively ceased as there was no longer any sporting content being transmitted. By 21 March, TWC Reloaded moved to the movie section of the Sky EPG at channel number 333 and was temporarily renamed as Movies 333 in the process, where it would fully launch as True Movies.

=== Losses and revamp ===
By the end of 2004, The Wrestling Channel's parent company announced that they were running at a loss due to lower-than-expected viewing figures generating less revenue than it was costing to run the operation. They added that most promotions had been more than co-operative in allowing contract re-negotiations. To solve this, the channel signed a new deal with TNA to feature their events on a one-week delay basis. Ring of Honor was expanded into a new, exclusive two-hour weekly show, more promotions like ZERO1-MAX were added to the schedule, whilst Memphis Wrestling and Pro Wrestling Noah had even newer up-to-date weekly shows. Eventually, the channel indicated that viewer ratings had increased.

On 3 October 2005, The Wrestling Channel began to refer to itself more under its shortened name of TWC, as they began to add other fighting sports to their schedule in order to appeal to new viewers and non-Wrestling fans. During the month of November, the station added mixed martial arts and boxing programming to its existing schedule for the first time. By 1 July 2006 began broadcasting a full 24 hours a day, seven days a week without any Teleshopping. In that month, the channel began to air action movies.

=== TWC Fight, purchase by The Fight Network and Closure ===
The channel would eventually change its name to TWC Fight! on 4 December 2006, and added more mixed martial arts programming to their schedule, including Cage Rage Championships and King of the Cage. On 15 December 2006 TWC Fight! announced they had lost the rights to air TNA programming, which after 1 January 2007 had moved to Bravo 2.

In late 2007, Canadian based channel The Fight Network purchased TWC Fight! and in January 2008, the channel became a UK version of The Fight Network, owned by Dolphin Television. The Fight Network aired the same programming as before, just under a different name. By July 2008 the channel launched on Freesat channel 251.

After 6 years, the channel ceased transmission on 1 December 2008 at midnight and was removed from the Sky EPG a few hours later.

=== Relaunch as programming block ===
On 13 July 2018, it was announced that Anthem Sports & Entertainment Corp. would relaunch Fight Network as a programming block on Showcase by Information TV. The block would feature various sports, including live Impact Wrestling, Ultimate Challenge MMA, Abu Dhabi Grand Slam, WGP Kickboxing, Wrestling at the Chase and other programmes. Due to the way it is placed and the obscurity of the original version, Anthem are treating it as a new channel launch.

The block mainly focuses on Wrestling like its predecessor, with a mixture of other fighting sports as well.

== Original programming ==
=== Professional wrestling ===
- The Bagpipe Report
- Irish Whip Wrestling
- Shoot interviews
- 3PW
- Consejo Mundial de Lucha Libre
- Classic Memphis Wrestling
- Combat Zone Wrestling
- Frontier Wrestling Alliance
- Frontier Martial-Arts Wrestling
- GAEA Japan
- Icons of Wrestling
- LDN Wrestling: Capital TV
- Major League Wrestling
- Memphis Wrestling
- Pro Wrestling Noah
- ChickFight
- Real Quality Wrestling
- Ring of Honor
- NWA:Total Nonstop Action
- UWA Hardcore Wrestling
- World of Sport
- Wrestling at the Chase
- Wrestling Reality
- Xcitement Wrestling Federation

=== Combat sports ===
- After The Bell
- Ballroom Boxing
- Before The Bell
- Cage Rage Championships - Cage Fighter
- Hardcore Championship Fighting
- ICON Sport
- Knockout News
- One on One
- ROUGH
- So You Wanna Fight
- TKO Championship Fighting
- Tough Guy Cinema
- UK Boxing
- UK MMA
- Ultimate Combat Experience
- X-treme Fighting Championship

== See also ==
- Professional wrestling in the United Kingdom
- WWE Network
- WWE Network (Canada)
- WWE Classics on Demand
- NJPW World
- WWNLive
