= Spice Networks =

Group of adult pay-per-view TV channels

The logo of Spice Networks

The Spice Networks are a group of television channels operated on a pay-per-view basis that broadcast pornographic content. The channels are owned by the adult entertainment conglomerate Aylo. The networks were originally launched in 1989 by Graff Pay-Per-View. They are available via cable, IPTV, and satellite in over 72 countries including the United States and formerly New Zealand.

== History ==
The channels first launched in 1989 by Mark Graff, Founder and President of Graff Pay-Per-View. In 1998, Playboy Enterprises acquired Spice Entertainment Cos. Inc. and its two channels, the original Spice and the Adam & Eve Channel.

By 2005, there were seven channels in the group: Spice, Spice 2, The Hot Network, The Hot Zone, Spice Hot, Spice Live, and Spice Platinum. There were several international networks in the group as well, which included Private Spice in Europe, Spice TV Korea, Spice and Spice 2 in New Zealand, and The Adult Channel, Playboy TV UK, Playboy One, and Spice Extreme in the United Kingdom.

On November 1, 2006, the US channels were renamed Fresh!, Shorteez, ClubJenna and Spice Xcess. The other three networks were shut down. The New Zealand network was renamed Spice Xcess around the same time. In late 2009, Shorteez was renamed to SKiN TV. In the UK, Spice Extreme was removed from the Sky EPG in March 2010, while Playboy One later saw a rebranding to Paul Raymond TV, Top Shelf TV and My Ex-Girlfriends.

In November 2011, Playboy Enterprises sold the Spice Networks, along with the Playboy TV channel, and the operating rights to Playboy's websites (excluding the Playboy Cyber Club, which was later shut down) to Manwin (later MindGeek, now Aylo). In January 2013, the US networks were rebranded with the names of brands owned by MindGeek – Brazzers TV, BangU, RKTV and Mofos. The international networks were later rebranded as well, with Private Spice becoming Brazzers TV Europe and RKTV, My Ex-Girlfriends becoming Babes and Brazzers, and Spice Xcess in New Zealand rebranded as Brazzers TV which later ceased broadcasting. The South Korean version of Spice TV remains the only Spice Networks channel that still broadcasts under the name.
