= Babeworld =

British adult chat television channel (2006–2011)

- Broadcast area: United Kingdom, Republic of Ireland
- Headquarters: Chesham, Buckinghamshire

Programming
- Language: English
- Picture format: 16:9 SD

Ownership
- Sister channels: House of Fun TV

History
- Launched: 2006

Babeworld was a British adult chat television broadcaster on Sky (UK & Ireland) from 2006 until 2011. Both the channel and programme were named Babeworld.

It launched on Sky on 2 March 2006, replacing the revived version of L!VE TV. In 2007 and 2008, it was also responsible for the channel House of Fun TV, later renamed Babeworld XXXTRA (Babeworld TV Extra) which replaced it on the Sky EPG in mid-2008. The two channels' numbers on the EPG were 909 and 962 (in 2007), then 908 and 949 (in 2008), and 908 and 952 (in 2010).

In 2010, the channels were taken over by Bluebird TV, which went on to become a large adult content producer. Because the Babeworld TV Limited company was no longer deemed to have "general control" over its broadcasts, the main Babeworld channel closed on 22 October 2011, two days prior to Ofcom publishing a notice of revocation for its broadcast licence.

== History ==
In November 2006, ICSTIS fined Babeworld's telephone network £10,000, because the channel was running a sexually-explicit service during the daytime.

In 2007, House of Fun TV ran the nightly show Just Girly, and a short-run series with three male hosts, Boys Next Door. As male presenters are rare on adult chat channels, this was one of the only programmes of its kind ever to be broadcast, coinciding with the regular show on GAYtv.

In November 2007, the Babeworld channel was reproached and fined £25,000 by Ofcom for broadcasting sexually-explicit material at 9.15pm. The ruling said that "the content was so explicit, and in particular the language, it was considered to be 'adult-sex' material. This meant it should have been broadcast under encryption."

Babeworld's programmes Babeworld TV, Freeblue 1 and Bluebird Daytime TV had at various times been found to breach the BCAP code due to their sexually explicit content between 2009 and 2011.

On 24 October 2011, the channel had its broadcasting licence revoked by Ofcom after the licensee, Babeworld TV Limited, failed to satisfy the regulator that it had "general control over which programmes and other services were comprised in the Service". Ofcom therefore concluded that Babeworld TV Limited was not the provider of its licensed services in accordance with section 362(2) of the Communications Act 2003. Both House of Fun and The Other Side had their licences revoked at the same time, for the same reason.

== See also ==
- List of adult television channels
