= Eric Hall =

British football agent (1947–2020)

- Born: 11 November 1947; Bethnal Green, London
- Died: 16 November 2020 (age 73)
- Occupations: A&R man Football agent Disc jockey

Eric Hall (11 November 1947 – 16 November 2020) was a British show business and football agent known for his flamboyant public persona, quick wit, unique fashion sense, and the catchphrase "Monster, monster ...".

== Biography ==
After an early career as a singer (he sang backing vocals for Tiny Tim) and actor, in the early 1970s Hall became a publicist for EMI Records. There, he worked in the Artists and Repertoire department, where he met and befriended Freddie Mercury, he also claimed the song, "Killer Queen" was written about him, despite Mercury stating it was about a call girl. Hall arranged the Sex Pistols' infamous, expletive-filled appearance on the Today television show in 1976 presented by Bill Grundy. Hall grew up in Bethnal Green in the East End of London, and was a friend of Marc Bolan. He had been with Bolan earlier on the night of the singer's death in a car crash in 1977.

Hall was once tea boy with Elton John and also worked PR in the music business, promoting Frank Sinatra, the Sex Pistols, T-Rex, Queen, Steve Harley and the Bay City Rollers.

In 1986, a chance meeting with Steve Perryman led to him becoming a football agent, and within 10 years he had built up a roster of about 40 well-known clients, including John Fashanu, Robbie Savage, Tim Sherwood, John Scales, Neil Ruddock, Dave Beasant, Paul Walsh, Dennis Wise, and England team manager Terry Venables. As an agent, Hall helped raise the status of footballers, negotiating for large salaries, appearance fees, branding rights and other commercial bonuses. Hall fell out with John Fashanu over his decision to help his brother Justin sell his story to a national tabloid newspaper, in which he came out as gay. Fashanu was outraged and the pair never spoke again.

In 1996, Hall was a regular guest on Caesar's Rude Arena for Television X, hosted by Caesar the Geezer, in which he referred to callers as "bubbeleh", thus revealing his Jewish roots.

Hall can be seen in the July 1973 BBC Television Man Alive documentary film "Twinkle Twinkle Little Star", as one of a group of EMI men promoting 11-year-old boy singer Darren Burn and his first single. The programme was first broadcast in October of that year.

== Radio presenting ==
Hall presented regular radio shows on stations including BBC Essex, Phoenix FM and Time 107.5. Among the shows he presented was You Can Take The Boy Out Of The East End But You Can't Take The East End Out Of The Boy, in which he traced his East End roots, and in 2002 he marked the 50th anniversary of the UK Singles Chart, when he presented The First Ever Singles Chart. It featured interviews with all the surviving singers who were in the first Top 12 from November 1952.

== Personal life and death ==
In 1997, Hall had a health scare when he was admitted to hospital for what at the time was believed to be E.coli poisoning and septicaemia; he spent eight weeks in a coma. Later, a blood specialist diagnosed him with the blood disorder Thrombotic thrombocytopenic purpura.

Hall died on 16 November 2020, at the age of 73, after contracting COVID-19.

== Discography ==
- Monster Cash (1997)
