= BeatBullying =

Anti-bullying charity

- Founded: 1999
- Founder: Emma-Jane Cross
- Key people: Emma-Jane Cross
- Affiliations: Anti-Bullying Alliance
- Website: Archived October 11, 2014, at the Wayback Machine

BeatBullying was an international charity aiming to empower young people to lead anti-bullying campaigns in their schools and local communities, and to build the capacity of local communities to sustain the work. BeatBullying devised bullying prevention strategies for young people by young people, focusing on "peer to peer" education and empowering young people to take action against incidents of bullying and help others combat the problem, both online and off.

In schools where BeatBullying has worked, their internal evaluation suggests that incidents of bullying have been reduced by an average of 39%.

BeatBullying suspended services in October 2014.

== History ==
BeatBullying was established in 1999 by its current CEO Emma-Jane Cross and became a registered charity in 2002. In 2009 it launched the Beatbullying website, an online peer mentoring service for 11- to 18-year-olds delivered via a social networking site. BeatBullying has worked directly and indirectly with 700,000+ young people over the last five years across the UK. 2013 saw the launch of MindFull, a mental health support site offering free counseling and peer support to people aged 11–17.

In October 2014, BeatBullying and MindFull suspended services and were placed in administration due to financial difficulties.

== Activities ==
BeatBullying used a range of techniques to deliver its bullying prevention model and engage with young people. As well as the core BB Mentoring that took place in schools, the charity provided an online social networking and mentoring service through the www.beatbullying.org website where young people mentored other young people about bullying and issues surrounding bullying and had access to specialist counsellors online.

== Campaigns and policy work ==
BeatBullying campaigned to shape attitudes and change behaviour relative both to on and offline bullying. It ran regular media campaigns including "The Big March", a digital demonstration where instead of streets, the public was invited to sign up, create their own BeatBullying Big March avatar and march across global websites for the right of children and young people across the world to be able to live without fear of bullying and cyberbullying. The march was to end with BeatBullying delivering an e-petition to the European Commission, both online, and in Brussels. In 2014, The Big March was supported and joined by celebrities like Aston Merrygold, Little Mix and Jamie Laing from Made in Chelsea.

“click bullying into touch” was a campaign in conjunction with the now-defunct British tabloid newspaper, News of the World.

BeatBullying also worked with government and industry groups via taskforces such as UKCCIS to advise on bullying and to encourage changes in industry practice.
