= Caesar the Geezer =

Talk show DJ popular in the early 90s

Caesar The Geezer
- Born: Chris Ryder; 1956 or 1957 (age 68–69)
- Other name: Chris Rogers
- Employer: CTG Broadcast / SFM Radio – Sittingbourne
- Known for: British radio personality

Chris Ryder (born Chris Neophytou in 1956 or 1957 (age 68–69)), also known as Caesar the Geezer, Caesar the Boogieman, and Deck Rider, is a British radio personality.

== Early career ==
He began his career as the on air character "Deck Rider" on the Kenny Everett Radio Show on Capital Radio (London) in 1974. He went from there to London pirate station, Skyline Radio, and then on to get his first "paid gig" on the Rod Lucas Show on BBC Radio Kent.

Shortly afterwards they both moved to the newly created Invicta Radio.

== Invicta FM ==
Ryder later changed his radio name to Caesar the Boogieman when he landed his own show on Invicta Radio after Rod Lucas left the station. Caesar the Boogieman orchestrated some ambitious on-air practical jokes during his time at Invicta. One example: he built up the premise that an asteroid was about to hit the moon, creating a bright light. It would only be safe to look at the light by wearing sunglasses. The show had its serious side with legal advisors and social workers as constant guests helping listeners with problems.

The popular shows in his 9pm–1 am slot featured characters including Barry Bethall as 'Basil the Butler', Ian Collins as 'The Yob', and Bobby Prior as 'Venus', Richard Knight as 'Clarence', 'Number 5' and 'Grandad' and Steve Mallion as 'Spartacus'. In 1991, Invicta sacked him over fraud allegations.

== Essex Radio ==
Ryder joined Essex Radio 96.3/102.6 FM where he presented a competing night time show to the one he had left at Invicta, before moving onto Kiss 100 hosting the early breakfast show.

== Talk Radio UK ==
Ryder joined Talk Radio UK for its launch in February 1995 where he became known as a shock jock. He presented the weeknight (Mondays–Fridays) phone in between 22:00 and 01:00. He was joined on some Friday evenings by football agent Eric Hall and lawyer Gary Jacobs. He regularly combined his programme with a similar American show presented by Tom Leykis, alternating between UK and US callers.

He continued his practical jokes during his time at Talk Radio. Another such wind-up involved making listeners believe he was broadcasting his show from the street outside the Talk Radio building in protest at the station's anti-smoking policy. In reality, he was producing his show from inside the studio with a microphone hanging from the window to pick up the background noises of the street below.

During his tenure at TRUK, he was often accompanied by the show's Canadian producer Colin Lloyd, assistants Dixi, Jane and Aphrodite, and the man on the phones, also called Tony (Caesar referred to him as Bogey – "Because he always gets up my nose").

He was fired from Talk Radio in September 1995, along with fellow controversial presenter Terry Christian, as part of a station shakeup to tackle sagging ratings.

== After Talk Radio ==
After this, he brought his phone-in show to Galaxy 101 in Bristol for a short time, as well as a brief stint, slightly toned down, on London's LBC. At around this time, he also started doing voice links for the UK porn TV station, The Adult Channel; and presented a programme called Caesar's Rude Arena for Television X.

Ryder joined Capital Gold in February 1996 and did his own weeknight show called Elvis hour which would regularly overrun as he is an Elvis fan himself, he pulled in an audience of over 3.4 million with his weekly show from 8pm until midnight Monday to Friday In mid-1997, he resigned and was sentenced for breaking the law regarding undischarged bankrupts.

He then retired from radio to pursue a career in marketing and promotions, returning to the air in 2012 with Sittingbourne's SFM Radio.
