= 2ergo =

Communications company

2ergo Group plc
- Company type: Private company
- Industry: Mobile phone, Marketing
- Founded: Manchester, England (1999)
- Headquarters: Manchester, England
- Website: www.2ergo.com

2ergo was a provider of mobile-phone marketing and messaging services. Founded in 1999, it is based in Salford Quays, near Manchester, UK. In April 2014, it was taken over by Eagle Eye, and is now a division of Eagle Eye.

== Mobile websites and publishing ==
2ergo has developed mobile websites for brands including FOX News, AT&T, NBC Universal, Yahoo!, Australian Broadcasting Corporation (ABC), Rightmove and Uno Medios.

The company produced smartphone applications for brands such as FOX Business, the Guardian (a UK national newspaper) and Rightmove, the largest real estate website in the UK.

In November 2011, 2ergo announced it was closing the smartphone application part of the business in the UK. It announced 30 job cuts across this section.

== Awards ==
Mobile Advertising and Marketing Awards (MAMA) Gold and Silver Awards The Mobile Advertising and Marketing Awards recognises technologies, innovations and campaigns that moved the industry forward last year. 2ergo won a Gold Award for "Best Integrated and Cross-Platform Strategy Utilizing Mobile Marketing" for the Army National Guard "Warrior" campaign and a Silver Award for Mobile Site Builder in the "Best creativity or innovation in mobile marketing or advertising" category.

Mobile Star Awards – Winner Gold Star The Mobile Star Awards recognise the top mobile products, success stories and visionaries as chosen by readers of Mobile Village's free e-newsletter Go Mobile. 2ergo was honoured for its mobile website builder. Read the press release. Webby Awards – Official Honoree of the more than 8,000 entries submitted to the 12th Annual Webby Awards, fewer than 15% were distinguished as an Official Honoree. This honour signifies an outstanding calibre of work.

Deloitte Technology Fast 50 Winner The Fast 50 programme honours business growth, technological innovation and UK entrepreneurial spirit and is one of the UK's foremost technology award programmes. The Fast 50 award ranks the country's 50 fastest-growing technology companies based on percentage growth over five years.

Salford Business Awards Winner Held in conjunction with Salford City Council, The University of Salford and the Chapel Street Business Group, the Salford Business Awards creates a platform to promote the city, its businesses and their growing successes. 2ergo was selected as the winner of the "Innovation Award".

== Text messages complaints ==
On 18 September 2009, 2ergo were fined £80,000 by PhonepayPlus, regulator for premium rate phone-paid services, for sending misleading unsolicited marketing text messages. This was the 17th such complaint upheld where 2ergo was the service provider.

In June 2011, 2ergo announced they had put a hold on some of their SMS messaging services due to PhonePayplus Regulations. This resulted in the company issuing a profit warning.

== 2011 Losses ==
In the year to 31 August 2011 2ergo announced pre-tax losses of 2.8 million from 800,000 in 2010. The company blamed this on 'the rapid evolution of the market and changes in industry regulation.

== 2012 Profit warning and sale of overseas businesses ==
In February 2012 the company issued a profit warning and stated they had sold their overseas businesses, 2ergo Americas, 2ergo Australia and 2ergo India. The company said this would help stabilise the business by reducing monthly outgoings by £250,000. They have now focussed their business on a new application, Podifi, which is a mobile contactless payment and loyalty device.
