= Penthouse Forum =

Erotic magazine

Forum

- First issue: March 1968; 58 years ago
- Company: Penthouse World Media
- Country: United Kingdom; United States
- Language: English
- ISSN: 1043-0210
- OCLC: 19252232

Penthouse Forum, sometimes simply Forum, is a British/American pornographic magazine published by Penthouse World Media, the parent company of the American magazine Penthouse.

== History and profile ==
Penthouse Forum was started in March 1968 in the UK and featured letters, articles on health, medicine psychology and social relationships. Its subtitle was International Journal of Human Relations. The first American edition of Penthouse Forum was published in 1971 and became the fastest-growing national magazine by 1978. In the 1970s, Forum was one of the most-sold magazines in America. In 1996, Forum had 400,000 subscribers.

The "letters" section of the magazine became popular, resulting in the creation of another Penthouse publication, Penthouse Letters.

== Notable contributors ==
Many of the editorial staff and half of the letterwriters whose contributions were published were women.

Alastair Campbell, a journalist and Tony Blair's former director of communications, was a contributor to the magazine, as was Chad Varah, the founder of The Samaritans charity and an Anglican priest, who was a consultant on sex education for the magazine.

In July 2006 the rights to the British edition were licensed to Trojan Publishing.

== See also ==
- Penthouse (magazine)
- Outline of British pornography
