= Game Network =

Ownership
- Owner: Cellcast Group

History
- Launched: 17 September 1999
- Closed: 17 September 2005 (Italy, rest of Europe); 27 February 2006 (UK)
- Replaced by: Babestation

Game Network was a European free-to-air television channel. It was initially owned by Digital Bros group, and later taken over by Cellcast Group. It was first launched in 1999.

== History ==
Game Network first broadcast in Italy on 17 September 1999. The channel was available throughout Southern Europe, and developed, attracting an estimated audience of 300,000. It launched in the United Kingdom in May 2001 on Sky EPG number 223. At its UK launch, the Financial Times evaluated the channel's free-to-air business proposition, commenting that its potential viewers should be abundant with consideration to the surge of popularity of video games at the time, noting the rising popularity of video games, the release of hundreds of titles in the UK each year and the launch of the PlayStation 2 months earlier. The channel was expected to provide 24-hour television dedicated to video games and earn money from advertising and sponsorship.

The UK version of the television channel, produced by Cellcast included regional content with programs such as Digital Crack, Me in Mir, The Weekly Chart Show, Game Guru, Reloaded, LiveWire, and Evolution. In 2003, Cellcast started increasing control of the channel, with Sem Mioli of Digital Bros. side and Jonathan French and Craig Gardiner from the Cellcast side spearheading the channel) with the launch of non-gaming programmes such as Babestation, a late-night "tease" show. The success of this show lead to many other clone programmes appearing on other channels, and this alternative revenue stream lead to a later influx of phone-in quiz shows, of which Game Network shows many. By 2005, Game Network's UK games programming went largely limited to a block of raw games footage from 5:30 am – 10am, with Game Guru airing from 5 pm until 7 pm, followed by programmes such as Psychic Interactive, which continue until Babestation starts.

Game Guru relaunched on 20 September, 2004 with interactive features, including live chat and MMS picture messaging.

In 2004, the channel's Sky EPG number was 172.

In 2005, Charlie Brooker writing for The Guardian noted the incongruity of the channel's programming, with clairvoyance programme Psychic Interactive being, "interrupted every few minutes by an "ad break" largely consisting of stills of Pac Man accompanied by captions in Italian, or Mortal Kombat characters backed with heavy metal music".

The major gaming shows, such as LiveWire, were cancelled in May 2005, and the Italian-language feed from Hot Bird ceased on September 17, 2005, after six years on air. At this time, Digital Bros. sold Game Network UK completely to Cellcast Group, which completely dropped all video game content by 20 February 2006 and renamed it Babestation. On 28 February, the channel was moved to the adult section of the Sky EPG.
