= Byron Review =

2008 UK children's internet safety report

The Byron Review, titled "Safer Children in a Digital World", was a report ordered in September 2007 by the then prime minister Gordon Brown and delivered on the 27 March 2008 to the UK Department for Children, Schools and Families. It was authored and overseen by Tanya Byron. The report focussed on the use of video games and the Internet (particularly social networking websites) by children, and discussed the use of classification and the role of parenting in policing these.

== Key points ==
Key points of the review included:

- Use of the Internet and videogames is extensive among children of all ages, and the use of these can be beneficial since they offer opportunities for learning and development.
- There exists in both media material that is potentially inappropriate for children, both in terms of content and safety online.
- The report does not focus on whether the media itself causes harm to children but instead looks at how the media can be used to make children's lives better.

=== Parental/carer responsibilities ===
- Many parents do not understand the media, which the Review terms the "generational digital divide". This can mean that parents are overprotective through fear of what is available.
- Parents should be available to assist their children in making decisions about and during use of the media.
- There should be a shared culture of responsibility between families, government, and industry, to restrict availability of inappropriate material to children.
- The Review proposes a "national strategy for child Internet safety" which provides information to families.

=== Video game classification ===
- There are many systems already in place to inform parents and help them to restrict access to inappropriate games.
- Current ratings systems (such as PEGI) are sometimes misunderstood by parents as "difficulty ratings".
- The classification system should be reformed so that the BBFC plays a larger role in classifying games.

== Reception ==
The report was generally well received by parenting groups, the government and the media industry. The video games industry, however, raised concerns over how increased classification would be funded, with some concerned that the BBFC did not have the capacity for such an increased workload.

On the day following publication of the report, most UK newspapers had a story on their front page outlining the classification system proposed.

== Government response ==
In June 2008 the government published "The Byron Review Action Plan". This document set out how the recommendations of the Byron Review would be implemented across government. In December 2009 the prime minister and the Children's Minister asked Tanya Byron to provide a progress review. Titled "Do we have Safer Children in a Digital World?", The Byron Progress Review was published in March 2010.

=== Department of Culture, Media and Sport response ===
In May 2008 the Culture, Media and Sport Select Committee held an inquiry into harmful content in video games and on the Internet. On 14 May 2008 Minister Vernon Coaker gave oral evidence to the committee explaining that the Prime Minister's Internet Taskforce would be concerned not just with illegal content on the Internet, but also with "harmful and inappropriate content as well ... which may not be illegal but which cause all of us concern".

The Culture, Media and Sport Committee's report was published on 31 July 2008 and contained various recommendations among which were:

- That any approach to the protection of children from online dangers should be based on the probability of risk. We believe that incontrovertible evidence of harm is not necessarily required in order to justify a restriction of access to certain types of content in any medium.
- That the structure and funding of the Home Office Task Force on Child Internet Safety should be formalised.
- That terms and conditions which guide consumers on the types of content which are acceptable on a site should be prominent. It should be made more difficult for users to avoid seeing and reading the conditions of use: as a consequence, it would become more difficult for users to claim ignorance of terms and conditions if they upload inappropriate content.
- That the UK Council for Child Internet Safety should work with Internet-based industries to develop a consistent and transparent policy on take-down procedures with clear maximum times within which inappropriate material will be removed. This should be subject to independent verification and publication.

In June 2008 Culture Secretary Andy Burnham suggested the government should have a role in ensuring that content on the Internet met the same standards as that on television as "the boundaries between the two media blur". Burnham also raised the idea of warnings being applied to certain content on websites such as YouTube to help people "better navigate the internet". He referred to the Byron Review, saying that he thought people felt a "sense of risk and uncertainty about this world they are roaming". Burnham told journalists that he had an "open mind" about whether there was a need for a new Communications Act before the next General Election, indicating that his own preference was for smaller pieces of legislation as needed.

On 26 September 2008, Burnham delivered a speech at the Royal Television Society conference in London, in which he said that the government planned to crack down on the Internet to "even up" the regulatory imbalance with television, saying that "a fear of the internet" had caused a loss of confidence that had robbed the TV industry of "innovation, risk-taking and talent sourcing" in programming. He enlarged on his remarks in an interview published the following day in The Daily Telegraph, in which he said: "If you look back at the people who created the Internet they talked very deliberately about it being a space that governments couldn't reach. I think we are having to revisit that stuff seriously now ... There is content that should just not be available to be viewed. That is my view. Absolutely categorical." The article suggested that Burnham was planning to negotiate with the Barack Obama administration "to draw up new international rules for English language websites" and that another idea being considered was "giving film-style ratings to individual websites".

Burnham's words were criticized by technology journalist Bill Thompson, who pointed out that it was hard to reconcile his comments with the views of media regulator Ofcom that TV-style regulation of the Internet is both undesirable and unworkable, as the Internet is a network rather than a medium.

On 29 September 2008 the launch of the UK Council for Child Internet Safety was announced. Its initial brief included organising methods for the removal of inappropriate content on user-generated websites and developing measures to take down Internet sites promoting harmful behaviour.

== See also ==
- Internet censorship in the United Kingdom
- UK Council for Child Internet Safety
- Bailey Review
