= John Jesnor Lindsay =

Scottish former photographer

John Jesnor Lindsay (19 April 1935 – January 2006) was a Scottish photographer and adult film-maker who was active during the late 1960s and the 1970s. A former student of the Glasgow School of Art, Lindsay began his career as a photojournalist with limited financial success. By the late 1960s Lindsay had begun photographing nudes for adult magazines including Penthouse and Mayfair.

Lindsay filmed his short films on 16 mm film for distribution on 8 mm film, which was the major market. By 1974, Lindsay had made around 100 films for the 8 mm market.

John Lindsay died in Kent in 2006, but his death didn't become public knowledge until 2022 when it was revealed in the book Under the Counter: Britain's Trade in Hardcore Pornograhic 8mm films by Oliver Carter (Intellect Books).

== Works ==
Classroom Lover starred 19-year-old David Freeman, a former head boy, and Colin Richards, who was a school caretaker.

== Legality ==
Lindsay had numerous confrontations with the law and obscenity charges made against him; he was tried under the Obscene Publications Act 1959 and 1964 in October 1974, when the jury were unable to reach a majority verdict; he was retried on 20 November 1974 and found not guilty, and in July 1977 he was found not guilty.

=== First trials ===
Lindsay's 1974 defence said he was shooting pornography for export only and that, prior to shooting such material, Lindsay had visited Scotland Yard and been told he would not be acting illegally if he was shooting porn for release outside the UK. The prosecution's case argued Lindsay's films were being offered for sale within the UK and that a domestic distribution network for his films existed.

After the not guilty verdict, Lindsay began openly selling his 8 mm films in the UK, and he discovered a legal loophole in which hardcore films could be screened in British cinemas if they were run on a "Membership Only" club basis. The premises had to be privately owned and customers had to sign a membership form. Such cinemas had been using this loophole to show soft core sex films since 1960, when Tony Tenser opened the Compton Cinema Club in London's Soho. These cinemas were free to show material without it first being passed by the British censor, and would also be immune to prosecution under the obscene publications act.

By the early 1970s, such cinemas showed mainly soft American films, often with a violent S&M theme, such as Love Camp 7, Mondo Fruedo and The Smut Peddler. Lindsay was the first person to introduce hardcore films to the membership-only cinemas when he opened the London Blue Movie Centre in Berwick Street and the Taboo Club in Great Newport Street, the latter promising its customers "good uncensored porn in all its intricate cock raising forms". Other rival cinemas followed suit, notably the Cineclub 24 in Tottenham Court Road, the Compton Cinema, and the Exxon cinema club in Danbury Street, Islington.

=== Further legal issues ===
Police interest in Lindsay's activities intensified in the late 1970s: his premises were raided several times and attempts were made to close Lindsay's cinemas on charges of "running a disorderly house". Undercover police officers became members of Lindsay's cinema to gain evidence in the hope of catching audience members masturbating. Lindsay said an insider at Scotland Yard informed the police had been given orders to close his business down by all means necessary. In the early 1980s, Lindsay had begun selling compilations of his films on video, taking advantage of the then-unregulated British video industry, and selling them at £45 per tape through mail order. The tapes generally contained two or three films and professionally made trailers for other Lindsay titles.

== Partial filmography ==
- Classroom Lover (1970) +
- Miss Bohrloch (1970)
- Betrayed
- Oral Connection (1971)
- Wet Nymph
- Sex Angle
- Sex Ahoy
- Oh Nurse
- Desire
- Health Farm
- Jolly Hockey Sticks (1974, short film) +
- White Hunter +
- Convent of Sin +
- Triangle of Lust
- Boarding School
- End of Term
- Amanda at Night
- Fruits of Sin
- Hot Sensations
- Kiki and Lil
- Misadventure
- Sexational
- Sex Kitten
- Untamed

+ -indicates films cited at Lindsay's obscenity trials.

== See also ==
- Pornography in the United Kingdom
