= Cathy Barry =

English pornographic film actress

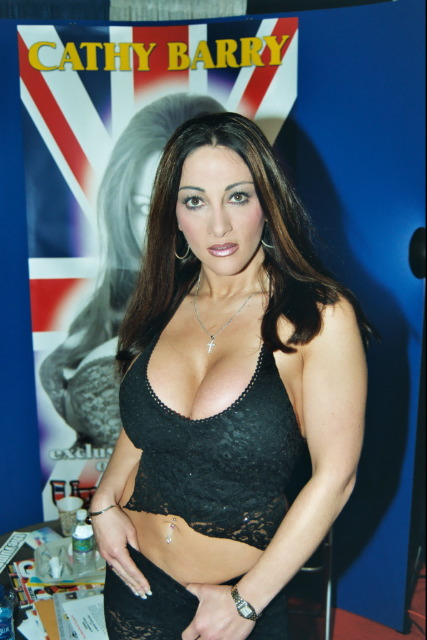
- Barry in 2003
- Born: Bristol, England
- Other names: Cathy Berry, Cindy Q
- Height: 5 ft 3 in (1.60 m)
- Spouse: Philip Joseph Barry
- Website: cathybarry.com

Cathy Barry is an English glamour model and pornographic actress. Along with her filmmaker husband Phil Barry, she also runs the adult film production and distribution company Pumpkin Media TV. Barry stars in her own DVD series, Cathy's Diaries.

== Career ==
Born in Bristol, Barry left school at the age of 16 and took a temporary packing job at a bra factory. She was then asked to model the bras for the company, and she appeared on the packaging for those bras. This led to other modelling jobs, which included one for a local body piercing shop and a radio station, Galaxy 101, at age 18. One of the radio station photos was used for a billboard advertisement, which led to her getting into glamour modeling. Later, she started lap dancing and table dancing in men's clubs.

She has appeared in and on the front cover of publications including The Daily Sport, Penthouse, Nuts, Score Magazine, Bizarre, and Gent, amongst others.

Around age 22, Barry started doing solo and then girl-girl videos, before progressing into boy-girl videos for larger production companies such as Playboy TV in a film called Countess Cathula. She began appearing in major adult industry productions in 2000, when she was 33. In addition to performing, Barry also has producer and director credits to her name. In 2002, she presented a programme on UK Horizons in which she toured sex shops.

In 2004, Barry starred in a Cathula follow up film entitled Cathula II - Vampires of Sex, which featured celebrity-gangster Dave Courtney.

In 2005, Barry was featured in promotional material which was aired via MTV across the UK and Europe for the Mötley Crüe album Red, White & Crüe.

In 2006, she starred in the adult film The Affair with Omar Williams. Although some critics attacked the film for bad filming that made it look amateurish, other critics praised the movie. In the same year, she starred in the comedy crime film Six Bend Trap, which featured Dave Courtney and actress Lisa Riley. The film was later re-released under the title Thugs Mugs & Dogs. She also appeared in the indie film Flip A Coin and the comedy horror film Exterminator City. Barry was also interviewed in the BBC documentary Private Parts: The Trouble With My Vagina.

Through 2008 and 2011, Barry appeared on UK porn channel Television X. Since 2010, she has appeared as a presenter on the UK adult television channel Red Light Central TV.

=== Television appearances ===
Barry has appeared on several UK TV chat shows, including Richard & Judy, Vanessa, and Trisha.

Through the early to mid 2000s, she regularly appeared on and presented several shows on the Granada Television/British Sky Broadcasting channel Men & Motors, including World of Big Boobs with Teresa May, 4 Play With Cream, One On One and the Terry Christian-presented The G-Spot.

In 2004, Barry underwent a breast implant operation that was broadcast live on the Five show Cosmetic Surgery Live. It was reported as being the biggest breast enlargement operation to be performed in the UK. The surgeon performing the operation was later called before his hospital's ethics committee.

Barry played herself in episode 6 of Unseen Skins on the Skins website. In it, she sleeps with the character Chris Miles, and, upon hearing about his love for his teacher, she promises him a cheque for £700 so that he can pursue her on a school trip to Russia.

In 2009, Barry appeared throughout the two-part BBC2 documentary Hardcore Profits, which investigated the workings and effects of the global pornographic industry. The programmes were presented by Tim Samuels.

== Awards and nominations ==
In 2007, Barry won the award for Best British Performer at the ETO Awards show. Later that year, Barry was nominated for Best Female Actress in the UK Adult Film Awards for her role in Cathy's Diaries 9. Barry also won the Lifetime Achievement Award at the 2007 UK Adult Film Awards and Best Online Female Actress in 2008.

== Personal life ==
Growing up, Barry had nicknames such as "Jeff" (as she had the same surname as Olympic shot put thrower Jeff Capes —Capes being her maiden name) and "Centrefold". She states that prior to her adult film and modelling career, she was a body builder and was also interested in going to college to become a chef. Barry has stated that she is bisexual.

In 2008, Barry was at the centre of an appeal in the Bristol Post after a duck from her family's home in Kingswood, South Gloucestershire had gone missing. A Facebook group Find Cathy Barry's Duck was set up, and the duck was found and rescued from a pond in Keynsham.

During the 2011 political scandal around Scottish businessman Adam Werritty's access to the Ministry of Defence, images were published in the national press of an earlier meeting between Barry and Liam Fox, the minister at the centre of the scandal.

In 2016, it was widely reported in the UK media that residents of St George, Bristol opposed planned changes to a building that Barry's husband Phil had run as an adult film studio (Bristol Film Studios) since 1995 and that Cathy Barry worked from, into a multiple occupancy house. Residents were concerned that short term rental contracts would attract people who would not integrate with the community. The changes went ahead. Phil Barry had produced and directed multiple videos featuring his wife.

== See also ==
- List of British pornographic actors
