= Friendly TV =

Defunct British television channel

Ownership
- Owner: Hi2 Limited

History
- Launched: May 2003
- Closed: 6 January 2010

Friendly TV was a British television channel, owned by Hi2 Limited. Much of the channel's output was made up of interactive programmes and games which allowed user participation by phone or mobile phone using SMS messaging. The channel was widely regarded as a pioneer in the low budget user generated content that accelerated the transition to online tv.

The channel was launched in 2003 on Sky Digital channel 268 and received immediate criticism for its poor content. Program content was devoted to an internet-based game called Brainbox, or a lengthy computer games show called GamerWeb contrary to the station's EPG.

Shortly after the channel was launched it ran a number of wrestling shows including Irish Whip Wrestling, Frontier Wrestling Alliance, and Pro Wrestling Noah. These were pilots for the TV station which was launched as The Wrestling Channel and later became The Fight Network.

The channel broadcast onto a number of Sky channels and was responsible for programmes such as Bikini Beach, Cash House, Stash the Cash, Vegas 247, and Live Roulette.

== Ofcom Content Sanctions Committee ==
Eventually, in February 2010, an Ofcom Sanctions Committee ruled against Friendly TV and related broadcasters, concluding that "serious and repeated breaches" had been committed.

To quote directly from the judgment of the Ofcom Sanctions Committee:

1.2 Friendly TV and Bedroom TV provide daytime chat and (post watershed) adult sex chat telephone services with little or no editorial context. Their programmes encourage viewers to call a premium rate service ("PRS") telephone number and talk to an onscreen presenter. Viewers can see female presenters engaged in conversation but cannot hear what is being said as music is played over the images. At certain intervals the presenters switch on a microphone and speak directly to viewers to encourage them to call the PRS number.

The Committee concluded that the breaches were serious making specific reference to explicit and graphic sex material broadcast without access restrictions after the 21:00 watershed. In accordance with Ofcom's statutory duty to protect the under-eighteens.
