= Phone-in =

Radio or television program format

In broadcasting, a phone-in or call-in is a programme format in which viewers or listeners are invited to air their live comments by telephone, usually in respect of a specific topic selected for discussion on the day of the broadcast. On radio (especially talk radio), it is common for an entire programme to be dedicated to a phone-in session. On television, phone-ins are often part of a wider discussion programme: a current example in the UK is the "Jeremy Vine" TV show.

The concept dates to the early radio era: a December 1924 BBC 5NG Nottingham phone-in programme is described in a 1925 Radio Times article: "listeners ... enjoyed the novelty of hearing their own voices taking part". A prior attempted phone-in to a BBC 2LO London programme "led to such a rush on the telephones that the Post Office had to intervene".

Speech based Talk Radio UK was launched in 1995, with much of its programming featuring phone-ins. It also introduced the notion of the shock jock to the UK, with presenters like Caesar the Geezer and Tommy Boyd conducting heated discussions.

Ian Hutchby has researched power relations in phone ins, looking at arguments and confrontations. Using conversation analysis, he describes how the host retains power through devices such as "The Second Position" – the concept of going second in a discussion, giving the host time to formulate a response. Similarly, the last word is always the broadcast word. The public can choose to end the conversation, but they are doing so by withdrawing from the interactional arena (Hutchby, 1996: 94-5; Talbot et al.).

In Ireland Liveline is a popular afternoon phone in show broadcast by RTÉ Radio 1 that is hosted by Joe Duffy. The phone in program usually focuses on consumer issues, current affairs and complaints from members of the public regarding various issues. The program and its presenter are frequently lampooned by numerous Irish comedians, one being David McSavage, who play on the popular perception that the program is merely an outlet for the angst of serial complainers and housewives while providing entertainment for those who revel in listening to despair and tales of misery delivered the callers. A quality of the show that is frequently satirized is Duffy's seemingly exasperated expressions of despair upon hearing of the plight of a caller.

== Technology ==
The caller is connected via a telephone hybrid, which connects the telephone line to the audio console through impedance matching, or more modernly through digital signal processing, which can improve the perceived audio quality of the call. Telephone calls are often organised through a system which also provides broadcast automation, with an administrative assistant answering calls and entering caller information on a personal computer, which also displays on the radio presenter's screen. A profanity delay is often used to keep profanity and other inappropriate material off the air. For contests, the conversation can be recorded and edited "on the fly", before playback on the air just a few minutes later.

== Game shows ==
Phone-ins have been used for types of live game shows, in which viewers call a specific number for a chance to be placed on-air to play a game, such as the franchised format Dialing for Dollars, and The Golden Shot—a British game show where callers gave directions to a blindfolded assistant to aim a camera-mounted crossbow at a target.

A once popular type of phone-in game show is presented as a contest. Viewers are posed a question or puzzle with one of more monetary prizes, and may submit an entry via a phone-in for a chance to be selected to go on-air. These programmes are monetized via contestants being encouraged to use a premium-rate telephone number to enter. The genre has faced criticism for having gambling-like elements, including viewers having no guarantee of making it on-air despite their paid entries, and shows having been accused of irregularities such as deliberately throttling the number of entries able to make it on-air, and posing questions with misleading or obscure answers.

== See also ==
- Vox populi
- Tradio

== Bibliography ==
- Crisell, A. (2002). An Introductory History of British Broadcasting (2nd ed.). London: Routledge.
- Hutchby, I. (1996). Confrontation Talk: Arguments, Asymmetries and Power on Talk Radio. London, England & Mahwah, NJ: Lawrence Erlbaum.
- Talbot, M.; Atkinson, K.; Atkinson, D. (2003). Language and Power in the Modern World. London & Edinburgh: Edinburgh University Press.
