= Bailey Review =

The Bailey Review (titled "Letting Children Be Children") was an inquiry into what was described as "the commercialisation and sexualisation of childhood". It was commissioned by the UK Coalition government in response to the manifesto commitments of the Conservative and Liberal Democrat parties in the 2010 general election. The Coalition believed that children in the UK were "being pressured to grow up too quickly", and sought recommendations on how to address what they perceived as public concern about this. On 6 December 2010 Michael Gove, Secretary of State for Education, appointed Reg Bailey CBE, Chief Executive of the Mothers’ Union (which had previously launched the "Bye Buy Childhood" report and campaign on the issue) to lead the Review. The results were published on 6 June 2011.

== Recommendations ==
The review made 14 recommendations:

1. Ensure that magazines and newspapers with sexualised images on their covers are not in easy sight of children.
2. Reduce the amount of on-street advertising containing sexualised imagery in locations where children are likely to see it.
3. Ensure the content of pre-watershed television programming better meets parents’ expectations.
4. Introduce age rating for music videos.
5. Make it easier for parents to block adult and age-restricted material from the internet.
6. Develop a retail code of good practice on retailing to children.
7. Ensure that the regulation of advertising reflects more closely parents’ and children’s views.
8. Prohibit the employment of children as brand ambassadors and in peer-to-peer marketing.
9. Define a child as under the age of 16 in all types of advertising regulation.
10. Raise parental awareness of marketing and advertising techniques.
11. Introduce quality assurance for media and commercial literacy resources and education for children.
12. Ensure greater transparency in the regulatory framework by creating a single website for regulators.
13. Make it easier for parents to express their views to businesses about goods and services.
14. Ensure that businesses and others take action on these recommendations.

== Criticism ==
Criticism after publication centred on the remit given by the Government. It was claimed that there was no open inquiry into the issue and the results were presupposed by the terms of reference. There was no attempt to define the "sexualisation" that was the basis of the enquiry, merely acknowledging that it was highly subjective. Questionnaires used were described as containing leading questions. The consultation focussed on the views of parents rather than women's rights organisations or experts on children. The choice of a representative of the Mothers' Union to lead the enquiry was seen, by some, as reinforcing this focus. The recommendation of a voluntary code of conduct rather than legislation was seen as potentially ineffective. The lack of any reference to mandatory sex and relationships education or a strategy on ending violence against women and girls were seen as significant omissions.

== Implementation ==
Opaque screens on magazine shelves have been introduced by some supermarkets to hide the partial nudity found on some magazine covers from children. In 2013 The Co-operative Food called for publishers to put such magazines in sealed bags. In 2014 supermarkets Tesco and Waitrose announced that they would be redesigning their newspaper displays to prevent the front pages of tabloid newspapers being seen by children. The move followed a joint campaign between No More Page 3 and Child Eyes. 'Active choice' filtering of adult content on the Internet (whereby the customer is required to actively decide whether or not to activate parental controls) in the UK by ISPs was also introduced in 2014.

== See also ==
- Sexualization
- Byron Review
- Internet censorship in the United Kingdom
