= Babestation =

British adult television channel

- Country: United Kingdom
- Broadcast area: United Kingdom; Ireland

Programming
- Language: English
- Picture format: 16:9 SDTV

Ownership
- Owner: Cellcast Group

History
- Launched: 3 December 2002 (programming block on Game Network); 20 February 2006 (channel); 2015 (website)

Links
- Website: Babestation.com

Availability

Terrestrial
- Freeview (UK): Channel 674 (00:00 to 05:00); Channel 673 (SmileTV3, 22:00 to 05:00)

Babestation (labelled Babenation on the Sky EPG) is an adult chat television channel and programme block which has aired on television in the United Kingdom since 2002. Since 2015, Babestation has also had a complementary website that includes more options than those available on the TV channel. The television version was the first show of its kind in the UK allowing viewers to communicate live with female presenters via a premium-rate telephone number or text messaging. It is broadcast daily, and since 2006, has had a dedicated channel on Sky. Its sister stations and websites are more hardcore in nature but the main programme shown on TV is also streamed on the Internet via the Babestation websites.

== History ==
Babestation began in late 2002 as a post-watershed two-hour programme (11 pm – 1 am) on the computer game channel Game Network UK. Babestation featured two women taking calls (unheard by the TV audience) whilst the rest of the screen was filled with viewers' text messages and one presenter, who improvised and reacted to the messages. On some occasions, the three women on screen would take turns as presenter.

Babestation was a unique style of TV programme in Britain. Despite not being popular and having low production values, Babestation produced many clones that can all be seen as originating from its format including the now defunct Playboy TV Chat and Xpanded TV. Whilst these channels vary in content and demographic, the premise is generally similar – live, simulated sex interspersed with unscripted conversation, advertising a premium rate number to phone the women, which makes it a profitable business.

Charlie Brooker of The Guardian accused both presenters and viewers of being "thick" and referred to viewers as "begging them to blow kisses and jiggle about a bit".

The programme proved profitable to the channel and Babestation's makers. In time, Babestation was given longer time-slots, and the number of presenters increased to four or five per night. Better technology allowed the director to put women on full screen instead of one-sixth, and hand-held cameras were introduced, replacing the poorer-quality static remote-controlled ones. Babestation was also sometimes broadcast on the Italian feed of Game Network.

This, along with Game Network's waning commitment to video gaming programmes (Psychic Interactive was also given a large amount of airtime), caused Game Network to cease to exist in the UK. On 20 February 2006, the channel's name changed to Babestation, and on 28 February, the channel was moved by Sky to the new "Adult" section of channels. It is also available on Free-to-air channels under the Adult Section.

== Sister programmes ==
- BabeCast – The initial sister program to Babestation, launching in 2003 as a strand on Friendly TV. Its content was more explicit and raunchy than what was shown on Game Network (with the channel's alternate name being BabeCast XXX), but still complied to Ofcom rules and guidelines. Friendly TV moved to the "Adult" section on the Sky EPG in 2006 on Channel 908, later 907. After Friendly TV closed, BabeCast was merged with Babestation.
- Babestation 2 – Broadcast on Cellcast's "Get Lucky TV" channel before being renamed as such, this program was initially a phone-in quiz/gambling program with occasional raunchy content, with the channel's name being a reference to the sexual term "get lucky". The program featured one or two presenters but was not divided up within a split-screen. The channel was rebranded as Babestation Blue in the 2010s before being closed entirely.
- Babestation Daytime – Initially launching as Lads Lounge, this was a pre-watershed format of the original Babestation that broadcasts from 5:30 am to 9:00 pm.
- BSX – An online subscription and pay-per-view service that broadcast hardcore pornographic content. Initially broadcast as a two-hour encrypted strand on SmileTV3 in 2012 It soon gained its own channel space and was renamed Babestation X in 2013, and BSX in 2014, airing from 11:00 pm – 4:45 am with two free views. The channel has since ceased operations.
- Babestation Unleashed – Originally called Sexstation, this program is similar to the normal Babestation program but with far more explicit content. It was broadcast online only, although BSX occasionally aired it.
- Dirty Wives – Airing on Babestation 2, this program featured more mature women (those of age 40+ or higher) and was normally on once or twice a week during the post-watershed slot. It was eventually axed and no longer airs.
- Masti Chat – A program where viewers could call up British-Asian women. The name is derived from the Hindi word मस्ती mastī, meaning "fun". It was normally featured as the pre-watershed program on Cellcast's networks, airing from 1:00 pm – 9:00 pm daily until early-2014. On occasion, the defunct Babestation 2 channel aired a post-watershed version of the program featuring more raunchy content on occasions. After the show was axed, much of the women who were featured left as well although some remained on Babestation Daytime.
- Party Girls – Airing on SmileTV and SmileTV2 on Freeview at night and Get Lucky TV on Sky during the day, this was another sister program to Babestation. It originally launched as Party People in 2006 and effectively renamed in 2007. The program was axed in 2009 prior to SmileTV's removal from the service, although it remained as an online-only service for a period.
- Babestar+ – Originally called Stardate TV, its license was revoked by Ofcom in January 2007 for broadcasting adult content when the license prevented it from broadcasting such content. The channel was reported in their May 2007 review, revealing that Ofcom had been investigating the network since December 2006, after the owners called Ofcom to inform them of their rebranding.

== See also ==
- Game Network
- Friendly TV
- List of adult television channels
