= Nina Roberts =

French porn star, actress, author and contemporary artist

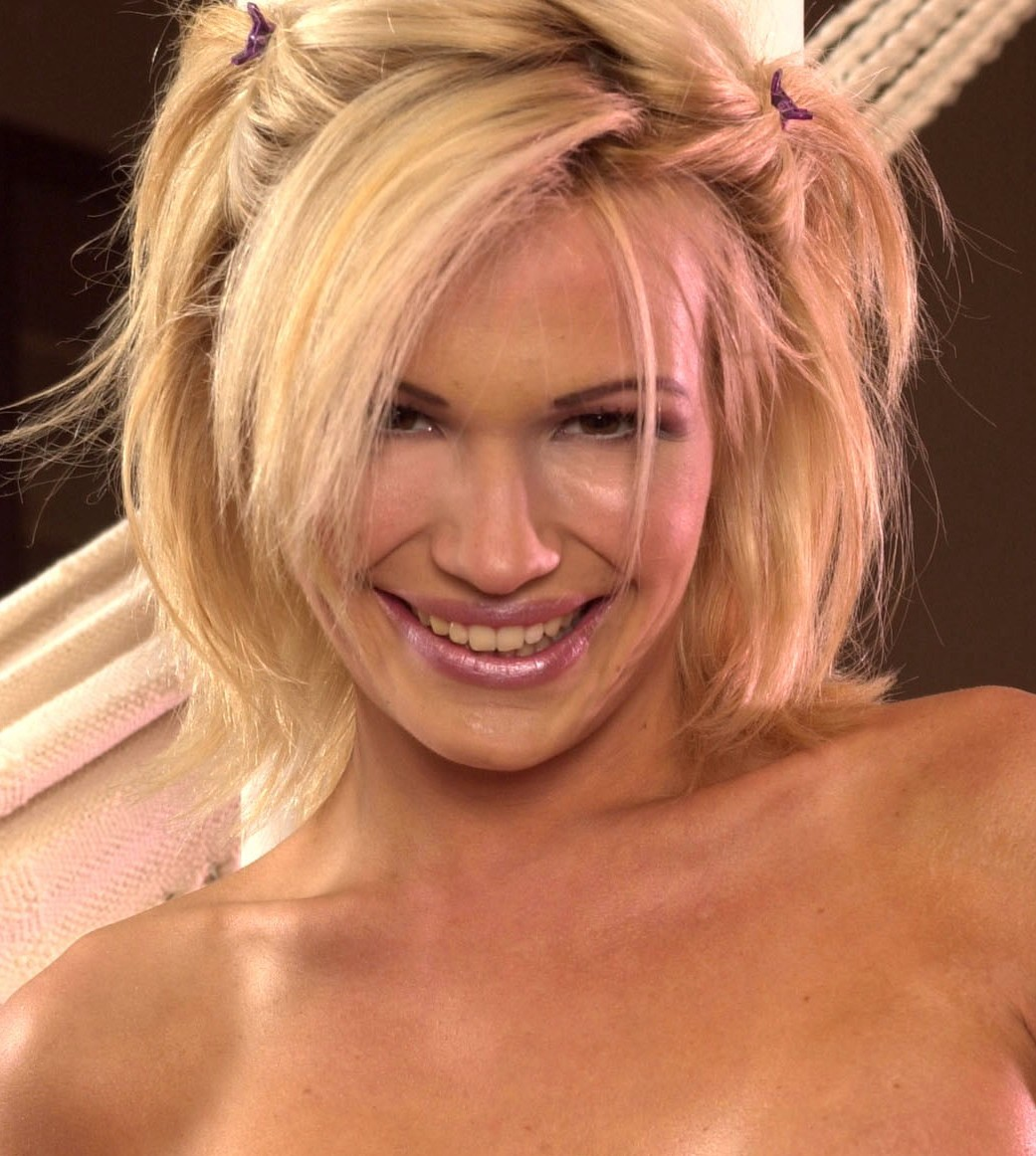
- Roberts in the early 2000s.
- Born: Villecresnes, France
- Other name: Gina Roberts
- Years active: 2002–2011
- Spouse: Rash Horresco

Nina Roberts is a French porn star, actress, author and contemporary artist (video and photo).

== Biography ==
Roberts grew up in Créteil, near Paris. A single mother at the age of twenty, she answered an ad to appear in a porn film in order to raise some money. After a few amateur shoots, she became a full-time adult actress and took the name Nina Roberts because of her passing resemblance to Julia Roberts. In 2003, she starred in Pretty Nina, a pornographic parody of Pretty Woman. Nina Roberts quickly became one of France's most popular porn stars in the early 2000s.

After two years of shooting porn films, she put her career on hold to write a book about her story in the adult industry. Titled J'assume (I take responsibility), it was published in 2004 by éditions Scali. Virginie Despentes wrote the book's preface.

In 2007, Roberts published Grosse Vache (Scali), a brutal portrait of a young woman fighting bulimia, anorexia, drugs (cocaine and speed) and finding love, which was a novel in the form of a diary. She worked on a film adaptation of Grosse Vache in collaboration with Evan Manifatori.

Roberts eventually came back to porn after a hiatus, although her onscreen appearances became increasingly rare at the end of the 2000s. Her performance in Casino No Limit won her the Ninfa Award for Best Actress at the 2008 Barcelona International Erotic Film Festival.

Roberts permanently ended her career as a porn star in the early 2010s. She played bass in a punk rock band and reinvented herself as a photographer but, to make a living, kept working behind the scenes in France's porn industry, as a casting assistant and press attache for Marc Dorcel. She also made several acting appearances in non-pornographic films. She eventually got a degree in sports and dietetics and became a professional coach.

== Awards ==
- 2008 : Brussels International Festival of Eroticism : Jury prize
- 2008 : Barcelona International Erotic Film Festival : Best actress
