= Astra 1H =

Communications satellite

- Mission type: Communications
- Operator: SES
- COSPAR ID: 1999-033A
- SATCAT no.: 25785
- Website: https://www.ses.com/
- Mission duration: 15 years (planned); 20 years, 4 months (achieved)

Spacecraft properties
- Spacecraft type: Boeing 601HP
- Bus: HS-601HP
- Manufacturer: Hughes Space and Communications
- Launch mass: 3,690 kg (8,140 lb)
- Power: 6 kW

Start of mission
- Launch date: 18 June 1999, 01:49:30 UTC
- Rocket: Proton-K / DM-2M
- Launch site: Baikonur, Site 81/23
- Contractor: Khrunichev State Research and Production Space Center
- Entered service: August 1999

End of mission
- Disposal: Graveyard orbit
- Deactivated: October 2019

Orbital parameters
- Reference system: Geocentric orbit
- Regime: Geostationary orbit
- Longitude: Astra 19.2°E (1999-2013); 52.2°E (2013-2014; Astra 19.2°E (2014); 67.5°W (2014-2015); 47.5°W (2015-2016); 55.2°E(2016-2017); 43.5°E (2017-2018); 67°W (2018); 81°W (2018-2019); 67°W (2019)

Transponders
- Band: 32 Ku-band
- Coverage area: Europe

Astra 1H is one of the Astra communications satellites owned and operated by SES.

== History ==
SES ordered its Hughes 601HP satellite, in 1995 for Astra 1H.

== Launch ==
Astra-1H was launched on 18 June 1999 at 01:49:30 UTC, by a Proton-K / DM-2M launch vehicle, from Site 81/23 at the Baikonur Cosmodrome in Kazakhstan. It was maneuvered into a geostationary orbit at 19.2° East of longitude.
