= Television X =

British pornographic television channel

- Country: United Kingdom

Ownership
- Owner: Aylo Global Entertainment (Europe) Limited
- Sister channels: Babes and Brazzers; Adult Channel; TVX 40+ XXX College; XXX Girl Girl; XXX Public Pickups

History
- Founded: 2 June 1995
- Former names: The Fantasy Channel

Links
- Website: televisionx.com

Availability

Terrestrial
- DTT: Channel 171

Television X is a series of adult pay-per-view television channels in the United Kingdom owned by Aylo Global Entertainment (Europe) Limited. Until 2020, it was owned by Portland TV which was a subsidiary of Richard Desmond's publishing company Northern & Shell until 2016. All of the programmes on the main Television X channel are filmed and produced in the United Kingdom. Like most other adult and specialist satellite channels, viewers need a specific viewing card to decrypt the signal. Unlike the standard Sky viewing card (which is normally left in the decoder at all times), the cards for adult channels are designed to be removed and stored in a subscriber's wallet when not in use. They often have no logo or company name on them, only the account number and the phone number for the channel's customer support service.

It was also known as Television X – The Fantasy Channel for a long time, although it has since dropped that name. It was originally to be called TVX until Desmond was advised that that name was already in use so "The Fantasy Channel" was added. Television X is also known by the abbreviation TVX.

== History ==
Television X started broadcasting under its original name – The Fantasy Channel on 2 June 1995. The two original hosts were Charmaine Sinclair and Samantha Jessup, with Debbie Corrigan and Kirsten Imrie making occasional appearances. Much of the original programming: Superdick, Shagnasty and Mutley, David Dickie's World of Sport etc. was developed by Deric Botham, then editor of Penthouse magazine. The station garnered international publicity when it brought the former American prostitute Estella Marie Thompson, also known as Divine Brown, over for a launch at BAFTA's headquarters in Piccadilly. On Friday nights, DJ Chris Rogers (aka Caesar the Geezer) presented a live two-hour show with sports agent Eric Hall.

The channel broadcasts from 10.00 pm until 5.30 am. Its programmes are around 30 minutes in duration and include titles such as John Cherry: Soccer Stud, Council Estate Skanks, Charlie Britton Exposed (in which Charlie is played by Ben Dover), Diamond Geezers and Lara's Anal Adventures. The majority of programmes are heterosexual although some, such as All Girl Initiation, feature lesbianism and some, such as Ladyboy Training, cover transsexualism. Some of the channel's programmes are pornographic spoofs on popular mainstream British television shows.

On 23 July 2008, Ofcom fined Portland TV £25,000 for broadcasting a R18-rated pornographic movie on the station in June 2007, with Ofcom rules not allowing R18-rated content to be broadcast on any television station.

=== 15th birthday ===
Television X celebrated its 15th birthday in August 2010 with a photo shoot of 14 of their top models from 1995 to then including Charmaine Sinclair, Lana Cox, Teresa May (not to be confused with the politician Theresa May), Cathy Barry, Michelle Thorne, Lara Latex, Kerry Louise, Sasha Rose and Syren Sexton. They also held a large party to commemorate the event in central London at Café de Paris (London), which featured both strippers and burlesque acts throughout the evening.

== Additional networks ==
In addition to the standard Television X network, several additional networks were available on Sky UK.

=== Television X Amateur ===
Launched on 1 November 2003 as Television X 2 on Sky Channel 971, replacing Erotika 4. TVX 2 showcased viewer-sent videotapes of amateur pornography. By April 2006, the channel was briefly renamed Television X Raw but was soon reverted to its former name by October 2007. During this period, the channel continued to focus on amateur tapes. In November 2008, the channel was renamed Television X Amateur (with an orange colour scheme), once again with the same general focus.

In May 2009, Portland TV was fined a total of £27,500 after the network aired a hardcore pornographic programme named Bathroom Bitches in September 2008, with Ofcom stating that channels broadcasting content under an equivalent of an R18 rating must not be broadcast under any meaning.

Television X Amateur was closed on 15 June 2012 after its Explicit materials licence expired, with sister network Red Hot Amateur taking over its EPG slot.

=== Television X FFWD ===
Launched on 1 November 2003 as Television X 3 on Sky channel 972, replacing Erotika 5. TVX 3 was a movie channel that showed pornographic films, which at one point, aired the movies Debbie Does Dallas and Deep Throat. In April 2006, the channel was renamed Television X Live before reverting to its former name of Television X 3 in October 2007. The programming transitioned to showcasing the Television X Callgirls Live chat program. In November 2008, the channel was renamed Television X FFWD (with a purple colour scheme), before closing on 21 May 2009, with its electronic programme guide (EPG) slot being taken over for Portland TV's chat services Filth, Cream and Skincity. The slot FFWD was housed in was taken over by sister network Gay TV.

=== Bangers ===
Bangers was launched at the end of 2005 as Television Xtra, as a Red Button service accessible through the other networks. It eventually launched as a standalone channel in February 2007 before being renamed as Television X 4 in October. The channel initially showcased pornography from continental Europe and the United States. After its renaming, a service called Television X FF (Fast Forward), which minimized non-pornographic content, was added. In November 2008, the channel was renamed to Television X Brits (with a Union Jack colour scheme), and changed its focus to British pornography.

In 2016, Television X Brits was renamed as TVXXX, which was then renamed again to TVX Pornstars on 29 March 2017. In September 2017, TVX Pornstars was added to Virgin Media, replacing Xrated Couples.

On 24 April 2019, with changes on the Sky EPG slot, the channel was renamed to Bangers and moved from 911 to 903 on the EPG. On 30 September 2020, following the purchase of Portland TV by MG Global Entertainment, Bangers was removed, and its Sky EPG slot was replaced with Babes and Brazzers.

=== Television X Pay-Per-Night ===
In August 2017, Portland TV launched a Television X-branded pay-per-night channel on Sky, replacing Xrated Couples. A second pay-per-night channel, titled Television X Pay-Per-Night 2, replaced Xrated Hook-Ups on Sky.

As part of a shake-up of the adult section on the Sky EPG on 24 April 2019, both Television X pay-per-night networks were shuttered, as most of the target audience had switched to online streaming sites.

=== Television X HD ===
Since 2010, Television X has an Ofcom licence approved for an HD service.

The HD simulcast of Television X launched on 24 April 2019, being the first pornographic channel in the United Kingdom to broadcast in high-definition. The SD feed relocated to channel 925 on Sky before being removed a week later on 2 May 2019 when Sky hid the adult channels from the EPG. From then on viewers had to key in the channel number to view them. This change was made as part of the switch to the Sky Q service, which would not include adult channels.

The HD feed was very short-lived, however, as the SD feed returned to Sky's EPG on 1 October 2019, closing the HD feed.

=== Television X Callgirls Live ===
Television X Callgirls Live was a televised sex line show broadcast on Television X 3 from 2005. The show was directed by Portway Productions and was produced by Ric Porter, who described it in his autobiography. It started with two "callgirls" (Avalon and Starr), but quickly grew to feature a number of different presenters. Original airtimes were between 10.00pm and 12.00pm but were subsequently changed to between 10.00pm and 2.00am. In August 2008, the show began broadcasting from 8.00pm showing softcore pornography until 10.00pm.

The show also ran on Television X 2 and Television X 4 from 9.00 pm until 11.00 pm (11.15 pm on Friday and Saturday) and then continued on TVX4 for 15 minutes, after which it began broadcasting encrypted hardcore pornography (consistent with the R18 certificate). This section was used as a means of encouraging viewers to subscribe to the Television X package. The channel was also available online, it was significantly cheaper to call the premium-rate telephone number than other televised sex line channels.

=== Presenters and awards ===
Presenters contracted to Television X in 2008 included Suzie Best, Cathy Barry, Claire Grey (aka Jesse Jayne), Amber Leigh, Renee Richards, Keisha Kane, Cate Harrington, and Donna Marie. In March 2008, glamour model Sammie Pennington was introduced as the new face and body of Television X. Three months later, glamour model Sophie Price was introduced as the new face and body of Television X. In addition, Linsey Dawn McKenzie attended the 2008 UK Adult Film and Television Awards as a representative of Television X and Red Hot TV.

The channel won UK Adult Film and Television Awards 2008 Best Pay Per Night Adult Channel. The award was picked up by Linsey Dawn McKenzie. Additionally on the night of the awards Television X and Red Hot TV (UK) received more than 12 awards including Jay Snake winning best male and Cathy Barry winning best online female actress.

On 11 March 2010, Television X launched their own awards called the SHAFTAs (Soft and Hard Adult Film and Television Awards). Winners included Kerry Louise and Tanya Tate. Both Angel Long and Syren Sexton picked up 2 awards each.

On 3 December 2010, Television X won two awards from UK Adult Producers (UKAP). Tanya Tate collected the award on behalf of Television X for Tanya Tate's Sex Tour of Ireland which won Best Reality Series. She also starred in the Television X series Diamond Geezers, which won Best DVD.

=== Websites ===
In mid-2007, Television X launched TelevisionX WebTV. The BBFC and Ofcom censorship rules not applying in this domain allowed Television X to show hardcore content to its viewers for the first time. In October 2008, Television X launched TelevisionX.com this change effectively split the Television X website into two. One, televisionxnow.co.uk, to be used for television subscriptions and the other, Televisionx.com to be used for explicit content. This split was a necessity brought about by an Ofcom ruling which banned the advertisement of an explicit website on British television. Television X can only advertise their soft website on air.

The hardcore uncensored internet website features programmes from the Television X station. However, the camerawork, editing, performances and bad language are modified to include explicit representations of sexual intercourse.

== See also ==
- List of adult television channels
