= Playboy One =

Former British satellite television channel (2005–2008)

Ownership
- Owner: Playboy TV UK/Benelux Limited
- Sister channels: Playboy TV

History
- Launched: 14 November 2005
- Closed: 1 October 2008

Links
- Website: http://www.playboy.co.uk/home/entertainment/playboy-tv/

Playboy One was a free-to-air satellite television channel in the United Kingdom operated by Playboy TV UK/Benelux Limited that broadcast on Sky Digital from November 2005 until the end of September of 2008. It was the only permanently free-to-air television station operated by any associated subsidiary of Playboy Enterprises.

== History ==
The service launched on 14 November 2005, and was described as a general male entertainment channel with a lower LCN, placing it in the "Entertainment" section of the Sky EPG, as opposed to specialist where its sister channel lies. The channel broadcast promos during the morning and afternoon, and from 7:00 p.m. – 11:00 p.m., broadcast a shopping strand titled "Playboy Store". From 11:00 p.m. – 5:00 a.m., the channel broadcast softcore erotic programming from Playboy's library, including Playboy's Babes, Sexcetera and Red Shoe Diaries.

By 2006, a newly-added "Adult" category was added to the EPG, and so the channel moved there.

The channel aimed to attract men to the pay-per-view Playboy TV, operating on the same satellite service. Despite a low profile, it steadily increased its ratings. As of the week ending 7 January 2007, BARB were quoting a weekly reach of 1,122,000 (2.5%)

On 1 October 2008, the channel was replaced with a Paul Raymond-focused channel named Paul Raymond TV, and became encrypted.

The media regulator Ofcom sanctioned Playboy One in 2009 after complaints were made about overtly sexually explicit content shown on air.

== See also ==
- List of adult television channels
