= GAYtv =

Former British adult television channel (2004–2011)

Gay TV
- Country: United Kingdom
- Headquarters: London

Ownership
- Owner: RHF Productions

History
- Launched: 2004; 21 years ago
- Closed: 7 April 2011; 13 years ago
- Replaced by: Flirt TV

Links
- Website: www.gaytv.co.uk hardontv.com

Gay TV was an encrypted subscription channel from the UK that broadcast over Sky and Virgin Media television platform from 20:00 to 05:30 daily, targeted at gay men.

Launched in 2004, the channel focused mainly on more hardcore content, but later incorporated shows such as Laguna Beach Love Affair and more softcore material.

Until 2007, it was the only gay adult channel on the Sky platform, and included a regularly broadcast live adult chat television show, one of very few examples of this with male hosts. This was recorded at the same studios as Television X Callgirls Live.

On 22 April 2008, Gay TV was added to Virgin Media channel 485. On the Sky EPG, its channel number changed twice, from 940 (in 2007) to channel 923 (in 2010) then to channel 953.

On 7 April 2011, Gay TV was removed from Sky channel 953 and Flirt TV (also from RHF Productions) was added to the Dating section of the EPG on channel 879. The channel ceased broadcasting on Virgin Media on the same day. However, the channel continues to operate on Virgin's On-Demand service alongside other defunct porn channels.

== See also ==
- List of adult television channels
