= Phone-paid Services Authority =

Regulatory body in the UK (1986–2025)

- Abbreviation: PSA
- Formation: 2016
- Defunct: 2025
- Legal status: non-profit making company limited by guarantee
- Purpose: UK regulator for content, goods and services charged to a phone bill
- Location: 25th Floor, 40 Bank Street, London
- Region served: UK
- Chairman: David Edmonds CBE
- Affiliations: Ofcom
- Website: www.ofcom.org.uk
- Formerly called: PhonepayPlus (2007-2016), ICSTIS (1986-2007)

The Phone-paid Services Authority (PSA) was the regulatory body for all premium rate phone-paid services in the United Kingdom between 2016 and 2025. It supervised the content, goods and services that consumers could buy by charging the cost to their phone bills and pre-pay phone accounts.

== History ==
Regulation of premium rate services commenced in 1986 under the Independent Committee for the supervision of Standards of Telephone Information Services (ICSTIS) at the request of three network operators (British Telecom, Mercury Communications, and Vodafone) as a response to public criticism of their profiting from premium-rate adult content. It re-branded itself as PhonepayPlus (PPP) in June 2007 and then as the Phone-paid Services Authority (PSA) in November 2016.

The PSA's and its predecessor organisations' authority to regulate Controlled Premium Rate Services (CPRS) came from Section 120 and 121 of the Communications Act 2003 and through Ofcom's Premium Rate Services Condition.

The PSA regulated those services using a Code of Practice, approved by Ofcom. This set out the rules with which all such providers had to comply. Among other things, it required clear and accurate pricing information, honest advertising and service content, and appropriate and targeted promotions. At first the code was updated approximately annually; in later times less often. For example, Code 14 was published in 2016, Code 15 was published in 2021 and came into force in 2022.

The PSA investigated complaints about phone-paid services. Where it decided that its rules have been broken, it could fine the company responsible, bar access to its services, and bar the individual behind the company from running other services under a different company name. Investigations and adjudications were free to consumers and were carried out independently.

The PSA regulated a subset of services using the following number ranges: 087, 090, 091, 098 and 118, plus five-, six-, and seven-digit mobile voice and text shortcodes beginning with a 6, 7 or 8. The PSA also regulated specific high-risk services such as sexual entertainment services as well as chat lines and call-connection services (ICSS), irrespective of call price or number range used. It also regulated services operating on numbers starting 070 until the 2019 Ofcom reform of this number range removed the underlying basis for premium rate charges, and internet dialler-operated services until 31 January 2025 – having been deemed by Ofcom to be obsolete.

On 25 October 2024, Ofcom published an official notice stating that Ofcom would formally withdraw its approval of the PSA Code on 31 January 2025 and take the regulation of Controlled Premium Rate Services (CPRS) back in-house on 1 February 2025. The transfer took place on 31 January 2025 and a number of key PSA staff had already been embedded within Ofcom for some time in preparation for this. The PSA Code of Practice was replaced by Ofcom's Regulation of Premium Rate Services Order 2024 on 1 February 2025, using the powers granted by Section 122 of the Communications Act 2003. These changes followed a public consultation held by Ofcom in 2023. The consultation document states that it was the PSA board that had suggested to Ofcom that they take back direct control of these functions. The changeover had originally been planned for an earlier date but was delayed by the calling of a general election earlier than expected.

== Powers ==
When the Phone-paid Services Authority upheld a breach of its Code, the company responsible had to immediately amend the service and/or its promotional material so that it complied with the Code. In most cases, companies found in breach of the Code were charged to cover the cost of the investigation.

The PSA also had the power to impose the following sanctions:

1. formal reprimands;
2. making companies apply to the regulator for prior approval;
3. ordering companies to pay full refunds to complainants;
4. imposing fines;
5. barring access to services;
6. banning named persons from operating services.

From 1 February 2025, Ofcom has exercised these powers directly.

== Board history ==
Chairs of the board have included:

- Sir Louis Blom-Cooper QC, Lawyer
- Brenda Dean, Baroness Dean of Thornton-le-Fylde, trade unionist
- Sir Peter North
- Sir Alistair Graham, former chairman of the Committee on Standards in Public Life

Members of the board have included:

- Matti Alderson, regulator
- Dr. Howard Baderman, A & E consultant
- Ruth Evans
- Hugh Griffiths, telecoms veteran
- Jeremy Hallsworth, chief executive officer of BT agilemedia
- Valerie Howarth, Baroness Howarth of Breckland, child care activist and founder of Childline
- Yvonne Light, writer & journalist
- Kate Marcus, barrister
- Claire Milne, telecoms veteran
- Mark Stephens, lawyer, mediator and regulator
- Howard Webber, consumer champion
- Paul Whiteing, regulator

The PSA published an annual report. The 2023/2024 report contained a review and short history of ICSTIS, PPP and PSA. The final report for 2024/2025 was published in June 2025 as the company status was changed to "inactive".
