= Anette Dawn =

Hungarian sex worker and make-up artist

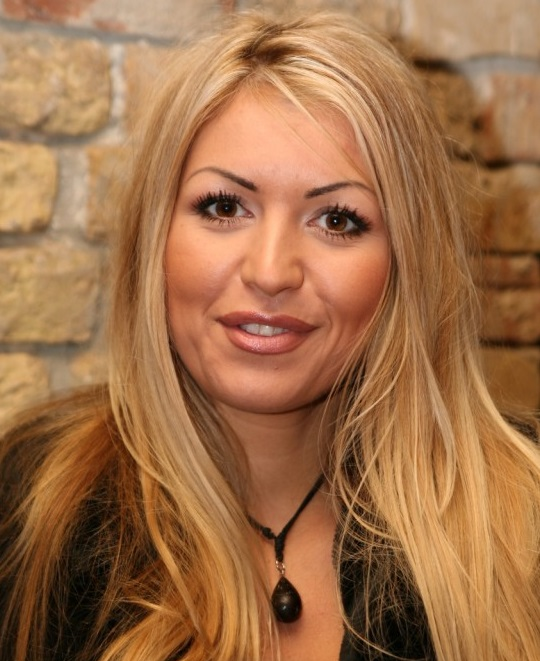
- Dawn in 2007
- Born: Anett Bocsi
- Other names: Bridgett; Brigitte
- Occupations: Call girl; make-up artist; ceramist; former porn actress
- Years active: 2001–present
- Known for: Adult films

Anett Bocsi, known by her stage name Anette Dawn, is a Hungarian call girl, make-up artist, ceramist, model, and former adult film actress. She rose to prominence for her career in the adult entertainment industry, which she pursued during the 2000s. She is known for playing in both lesbian films and solo scenes.

Dawn began her career as a model in Budapest, and made her adult film debut with the vignette tape Wild Adventures (2002), produced by Private, which was followed by several adult films throughout the 2000s. She subsequently appeared in the films Girl + Girl 9 (2004) and Street Heat 2 (2004). Her most prominent role was as a supporting actress in the film Butterfly (2005), in addition to appearing in other Viv Thomas productions, including Our Movie (2005) and Viv's Dream Team (2005). Dawn also played a softcore solo scene in the film Prime Cups 1 (2007), followed by a major supporting role in the high-budget production Downward Spiral (2008).

Dawn was named Treat of the Month for March 2007 at Twistys, and was later nominated for the 2009 Treat of the Year contest. She has been featured on the cover of several erotic magazines, including Aktuell Rapport, CKM, Mayfair, Men Only and Men's World.

== Early life ==
Bocsi originally began working as a make-up artist, and worked for one of the commercial television networks, where her job was very unstable. Back then there was a photo shoot in which girls dressed in suggestive clothes were expected, Bocsi immediately thought of trying, and finally became an adult model.

== Career ==
She debuted as a porn actress in 2002 when she appeared in the film "Wild Adventures" by Private company, then posed for other sites on the Internet and made a lot of photo sets and web scenes for VivThomas and for the website 21Sextury when it was just launched in 2003, becoming one of the first models of this site.

In 2007 Dawn ranked No. 1 overall in Twistys member voting, ahead of Crissy Moran, Shay Laren, Susana Spears and Erica Campbell.

In 2009 she was nominated for the Twistys Treat of the Year contest, competing along with other pornographic film actresses such as Ashlynn Brooke, Jessica Jaymes, Kayden Kross, Heather Vandeven, Louise Glover, among others, for the title and a prize of 10,000 dollars, but the winner was Bree Olson.

=== Appearances ===
Dawn has been a cover model for European and US adult magazines, such as Bitches, Ravers, For Men, Hawk, Gallery, Club Confidential, Swank and CKM. She has also been published in Private's magazines as Girls Only, Sex, Triple X, Private and Pirate. She appeared in magazines with exclusive interviews for Paul Raymond Publications as Mayfair, Men's World, Men Only, Just Girls, among others.

She has appeared also in the VirtuaGirl2 software, a virtual program of computer for the Windows desktop, in which she appears like a stripper virtually animated and where it is possible see her doing a striptease along with music from the same program on desktop.

In 2005 she appeared in the film 8mm 2, filmed in Budapest and released the same year, where she made a brief appearance performing a porn actress with Sandy in the scene where there are two naked girls on a photographic set, Dawn is one of the two girls on the set.

== Filmography ==
Adult films
Year	Title	Credited as	Studio	Director(s)
2002	Wild Adventures	Brigitte	Private	A. Youngman, Antonio Adamo, J. Walton, Kovi, Little AL
2004	Girl + Girl 9	Brigitte	Hustler Video	Zora Banx
2004	Street Heat 2	Brigitte	JoyBear Pictures	Justin Ribeiro dos Santos
2004	Exxxtraordinary Eurobabes 3	Bridgett	21Sextury Video	John Walton
2004	Sandy's Girls 1	Bridgett	21Sextury Video	Andrew Youngman
2005	LesGlam 1	Bridgett	21Sextury Video	Andrew Youngman
2005	Butterfly	Bridgett	Viv Thomas	Viv Thomas
2005	Our Movie	Bridgett	Viv Thomas	Sophie Moone
2005	Sandy: Agent Provocateur	Bridgett	Viv Thomas	Viv Thomas
2005	Sticky Fingers	Bridgett	Viv Thomas	Viv Thomas
2005	Viv's Dream Team	Bridgett	Viv Thomas	Viv Thomas
2006	Clit Club	Bridgett	21Sextury Video	Andrew Youngman
2006	Home Alone	Bridgett	21Sextury Video	John Walton, Andrew Youngman
2007	Prime Cups 1	Bridget	Cruel Media	Raul Cristian
2008	Pink on Pink 3	Bridgett	21Sextury Video	Andrew Youngman
2008	Downward Spiral	Bridgett	Private	Frank Major, Andrew Youngman
2010	Twisty Treats	Bridgett	Twistys	Kory Fame

Mainstream films
Year	Title	Role	Distributor	Director	Notes
2005	8mm 2	Adult performer	Sony Pictures Home Entertainment	J. S. Cardone	Cameo appearance; uncredited

== Distinctions and nominations ==
- Twistys Treat of the Month (March 2007)

In March 2007, Dawn was named Twistys Treat of the Month. Later, in 2009, she was nominated for the Twistys Treat of the Year contest.
