= Bob Carlos Clarke =

Irish-British photographer (1950–2006)

- Born: Robert Carlos Clarke; 24 June 1950; County Cork, Ireland
- Died: 25 March 2006 (aged 55); London, England
- Known for: Photography
- Children: Scarlett Carlos Clarke

Robert Carlos Clarke (24 June 1950 – 25 March 2006) was a British-Irish photographer who made erotic images of women as well as documentary, portrait, and commercial photography.

Carlos Clarke produced six books during his career: The Illustrated Delta of Venus (1980), Obsession (1981), The Dark Summer (1985), White Heat (1990), Shooting Sex (2002), Love Dolls Never Die (2004), and one DVD, Too Many Nights (2006).

His work is held in the collection of the National Portrait Gallery in London.

== Life and career ==
Carlos Clarke was born in Cork, Ireland, and educated at numerous English public schools, including Wellington College. After school and working as a trainee journalist and a brief job in Belfast in 1969, Carlos Clarke moved back to England in the latter half of 1970 and enrolled in Worthing College of Art in West Sussex.

By 1975, he had moved to Brixton, London, and enrolled in the London College of Printing. He later went on to complete an MA degree from the Royal College of Art in photography, graduating in 1975.

Initially in the 1970s, he began photographing nudes as a means of making money. He used his fellow students as models he shot for Paul Raymond Publications, Men Only, and Club International.

Carlos Clarke's first encounter with photographing models in rubber and latex was an experience with a gentleman called 'The Commander', a publisher of a magazine for devotees of rubber wear who had contacted Carlos Clarke to shoot for his publication. The British pop artist Allen Jones was a good friend of Carlos Clarke. Jones' work drew heavily on fetishism and he advised the younger photographer to lay off the fetish scene. He is known as "the British Helmut Newton".

== Personal life ==
While at Worthing, he met Sue Frame, later his first wife. Knowing that she was a part-time model, he instantly became a photographer and persuaded her to pose for him on a chromed 650 cc Triumph Bonneville. In 1975, a couple of years later, they married at Kensington Registry Office. Carlos Clarke was later remarried with his wife Lindsey. The couple had a daughter.

== Death ==
Carlos Clarke died by suicide on 25 March 2006 after jumping in front of an incoming train. He was 55 years old.

== Publications ==
=== Publications by Carlos Clarke ===
- The Illustrated Delta of Venus. W H Allen, 1980.
- Obsession. Quartet, 1981.
- The Dark Summer. Quartet, 1985.
- Shooting Sex: The Definitive Guide to Undressing Beautiful Strangers. Self-published, 2002. ISBN 978-0954346201.
  - Zürich: Skylight, 2002. ISBN 9783283004460.
- Love Dolls Never Die. Self-published, 2004. Edition of 300 copies.
- The Agony and the Ecstasy. Brighton, UK: Jane & Jeremy, 2018. With texts by Max Houghton and Carlos Clarke. Edition of 200 copies.

=== Publications paired with others ===
- White Heat. Octopus, 1990. With Marco Pierre White.

== DVDs ==
- Too Many Nights (Panoramica, 2006)

== Collections ==
Carlos Clarke's work is held in the following public collection:

- National Portrait Gallery, London: 10 prints, portraits of celebrities (as of June 2018)
- Science Museum Group, UK: 102 prints (as of May 2021)
