= Nicholas Whittaker =

British writer

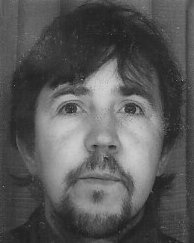
- Portrait of Whittaker, 1980s
- Born: 1953 (age 72–73); Shrewsbury, England
- Occupations: Journalist; Writer
- Children: 1
- Writing career
- Years active: 1980–2015
- Genres: Interview; Popular history
- Subjects: Sex; Consumer culture; Trainspotting
- Website: Nicholas Whittaker on Facebook

Nicholas Whittaker (born 1953) is a British writer of non-fiction books on popular culture, often incorporating autobiographical extracts from his own life. He was born in Shrewsbury and lived in Burton upon Trent until 1975. Whittaker has worked as a freelance journalist for pornographic magazines, interviewing figures such as Ray Cooney, Divine, Donald Sinden, Steve Harley, Justin de Villeneuve, Uri Geller and Kingsley Amis for Club International.

== Books ==
Whittaker’s first book was Platform Souls, published in 1995 on the subject of the British hobby of trainspotting. It follows his progress from the dying days of the steam locomotive in Britain (1964-1968), through the so-called Rail Blue diesel era of the 1970s, and his travels around Britain and Europe, by rail. The book ends with his failed attempts to interest his young sons in what was once a common hobby for a majority of British boys.

Blue Period (1997) was an autobiographical piece about Whittaker’s years working for pornographic magazines, notably Fiesta and then the Paul Raymond publications Razzle, Men Only and Club International. The book contrasts the popular and accepted mythologies of sexual liaisons in the magazines with the more mundane reality of Whittaker's own romantic experiences.

Sweet Talk (1998), subtitled "The Secret History of Confectionery", was a popular history of British confectionery. It told the story of sweets, chocolate, liquorice, chewing gum and ice cream from the late 19th century up until the end of the 20th, much of it seen through the perspective of sweet shops, school children and stories in the popular press. The book draws from a century’s worth of trade magazines such as Sweet Shop Owner and Confectionery News.

Published in 2001, Whittaker's Toys Were Us takes a look at toys and games from the mid 19th century to the final years of the 20th. The book was based on research in toy trade journals and is an overview of childhood favourites such as Hornby Dublo, Monopoly and Spirograph.

In August 2015 Icon Books published a revised and updated 20th anniversary edition of Platform Souls.
