= Men's World =

British pornographic magazine

- Men's World Volume 17 Number 1 cover, featuring Devon.
- Editor: Andrew Emery
- Categories: Soft-core pornographic magazine
- Frequency: Monthly
- Publisher: Paul Raymond Publications
- Founded: 1988
- Company: Blue Active Media Ltd
- Country: United Kingdom
- Language: English
- Website: www.paulraymond.xxx

Men's World was a British softcore pornographic magazine published monthly by Paul Raymond Publications. The final issue was Volume 24 issue 13, in December 2012. It was released every four weeks and its content mostly consisted of nude pictorials of well-known erotic and pornographic actresses. American models feature frequently, and well-known names like Aria Giovanni, Erica Campbell, Devon, Veronika Zemanová, and Anette Dawn have been cover girls in the past. British models who have been featured regularly in the magazine include Joanne Guest and Abigail Toyne.

When it was first published in 1988, Men's World was an unusually large-format magazine (an open spread page being closer to A2 than A3 as with most magazines), and the centrefold was in effect a high-gloss poster. After a while, the magazine reverted to the smaller, more usual format.

Men's World was published by Paul Raymond, who also publishes Club International, Escort, Mayfair, Men Only, and Razzle. Their magazines are generally available in most newsagents, although some larger retailers require a modesty bag in order to protect minors from seeing partial nudity on the cover. Digital back issues of the magazine are available from the Paul Raymond website. They were available from the Paul Raymond digital newsstand between 2013 and the closure of the newsstand.

== See also ==
- Pornography in the United Kingdom
- Outline of British pornography
