= Razzle (magazine) =

British softcore pornographic magazine

- Cover of Razzle magazine, Vol 2 No 5 (1984)
- Editor: Julia Jones
- Categories: Pornographic men's
- Frequency: Monthly
- Publisher: Paul Raymond Publications
- First issue: 1983
- Company: Blue Active Media Ltd
- Country: United Kingdom
- Language: English
- Website: www.paulraymond.xxx/magazines/razzle.html
- ISSN: 0955-1840
- OCLC: 793924276

Razzle is a British softcore pornographic magazine published monthly by Paul Raymond Publications. It was founded in 1983 and is currently focused on girl-next-door style pornography, offering cash for any photos of "readers' wives" printed; in the past, however, several notable glamour models were featured, including minor celebrity Jo Guest. It also includes the traditional feature of sexual fantasy tales presented as "true" stories.

There was an earlier UK men's magazine of the same title, published by Ritz Publishing Co., that dates from the 1930s to the late 1950s. This was a pocket format title, which featured a colour centre spread by the illustrator George Davies. This magazine was banned by the Censorship of Publications Board of the Irish Free State in 1935; the ban carried over to the later title and was lifted in 2011.

Despite the market for softcore pornography decreasing in the UK, Razzle is still successful, having launched some spin-off titles including Razzle Extreme, The Best of Razzle, Razzle Readers Wives and Razzle DVD. Razzle does, however, offer hardcore imagery and videos of the photosets found in its magazines online, on the official Paul Raymond website.

Razzle is published by the late Paul Raymond's publishing house, whose other publications include Club International, Escort, Mayfair, Men Only and Men's World. All of the Paul Raymond magazines are widely available in newsagents, although some larger retailers require a modesty bag in order to protect minors from seeing partial nudity on display on the cover. The magazine is also available in digital format from the Paul Raymond website. It was available from the Paul Raymond digital newsstand between 2013 and the closure of the newsstand.

== Early days ==
Nicholas Whittaker, journalist and author of Platform Souls, Blue Period and Sweet Talk, worked for the company from 1982 to 1987, and played a major role in establishing the new Razzle magazine. In its first format, Razzle was 48 pages and sold for 50p. He wrote of his experiences and the formation of the new magazine in Blue Period.

== In popular culture ==
The earlier men's magazine (1930s–1950s) was later immortalised in the Ian Dury song "Razzle In My Pocket" (1977, the 'B' side to "Sex & Drugs & Rock & Roll", Dury's first single under his own name), a story of a boy who steals a copy of Razzle from a newsagent in Romford. Written by Dury and Chaz Jankel, the song also appears on the 1981 compilation LP Juke Box Dury (side 1, track 6). Although the single was banned by the BBC, a number of Radio 1 disc jockeys, including Annie Nightingale and John Peel, continued to promote the record, also playing the B-side.

Razzle is also mentioned in David Lodge’s 1970 novel Out of the Shelter. In the book, the magazine is passed from hand to hand at the protagonist's school, and its readers are annoyed that the parts they are most interested in are covered up.

The Paul Raymond magazine (1983–) has been referenced in the mainstream media, with the name Razzle having been mentioned in numerous British comedy TV programmes, including Meet Ricky Gervais, Max and Paddy's Road to Nowhere, and in an episode of Absolutely Fabulous where it is implied that Patsy once posed for the magazine (albeit in the early 1970s when the magazine was not actually in production). It is also mentioned in Men Behaving Badly and Bottom, and in Little Britain, when Lou buys the magazine for Andy.

== See also ==
- Fiesta, its main competitor
- Outline of British pornography
- Pornography in the United Kingdom
