= Men Only =

British men's magazine

- Men Only cover, Volume 57 No 9, published September 1992
- Editor: Matt Berry
- Former editors: R. J. Minney (1950s)
- Staff writers: Nicholas Whittaker (1970s)
- Categories: Men's magazine
- Frequency: Monthly
- Publisher: C. Arthur Pearson Ltd (1935–1959); IPC (1959–1965); City Magazines (1965–1971); Paul Raymond Publications (1971–2012); Blue Media Publishing Group (2012–present)
- Total circulation (1972): 400,000
- Founded: 1935; 90 years ago
- Company: Blue Active Media Ltd
- Country: United Kingdom
- Website: www.paulraymond.xxx/magazines/men-only.html

Men Only is a British magazine title that originated in 1935 as a pocket-sized men's magazine. It became a standard-sized pin-up magazine in the 1950s and was relaunched in 1971 by Paul Raymond Publications as a soft-core pornographic magazine.

== Publication history ==
=== 1935–1965: Pearson ===
Men Only cover, March 1944

Men Only was founded in 1935 by C. Arthur Pearson Ltd (at that point an imprint of George Newnes Ltd) as a pocket magazine (4½" x 6½"; 115×165 mm). It set out its editorial stall in the first issue: "We don't want women readers. We won't have women readers...." It sought "bright articles on current male topics."

Humour was at the heart of the title, though from the start it carried fiction (including by P. G. Wodehouse), wide-ranging articles, and plates of "art" nudes. Covers were initially text-only, then carried caricatures of famous people until mid-1958, when photographic covers took over; photographers included John Everard and Joan Craven. It published colour illustrations of models by artists such as Archie Dickens, Blas Gallego, David Wright, and Vargas (as published in Esquire in the US), on a page labelled Let's Join the Ladies. Cartoons were by illustrators such as Belsky, Antonia Yeoman, Carl Giles, Frank Hoar, Keith Waite, and Bernard Hollowood.

When Pearson closed The Strand Magazine in 1950, it was castigated by The Economist for concentrating its resources on London Opinion and Men Only. Men Only had coloured frontispieces and rather trivial main pages. (Men Only absorbed London Opinion in 1954, at that point relaunching the magazine in a racier style.) The magazine was at the height of its popularity in 1955, with some issues reaching 200 pages in size.

Men Only's publisher Newnes/Pearson became part of International Publishing Corporation (IPC) in 1959–1960.

Another pocket title, Hulton's Lilliput, was better known, but Men Only took over Lilliput in 1960. All these titles were affected by the growth of television; it also lost readers to titles such as Haymarket's Man About Town (later Town) and Playboy. In response, in 1963 Men Only adopted a larger format and more pin-ups — but also reduced its frequency to bimonthly.

=== 1965–1971: City Magazines ===
IPC sold Men Only to City Magazines in 1965 — at that point City Magazines was already publishing the pin-up magazines Carnival, Escort, and Parade. The magazine returned to a monthly schedule, but was still mainly in black-and-white with a colour pin-up centre spread. Cartoonists published in Men Only during this period included Ian Miller, Paul Sample, and Pete Dredge.

=== 1971–present: Paul Raymond Publications/Blue Media Publishing Group ===
In 1971, Paul Raymond, who ran nightclubs in London's Soho district, acquired Men Only and relaunched it as the start of a top-shelf publishing empire, increasing its circulation to 400,000 copies a month. It was the main competitor to Fisk Publishing's Mayfair as well as US magazines such as Playboy and Penthouse during the 1970s and 1980s (Raymond latterly took over Mayfair in 1990).

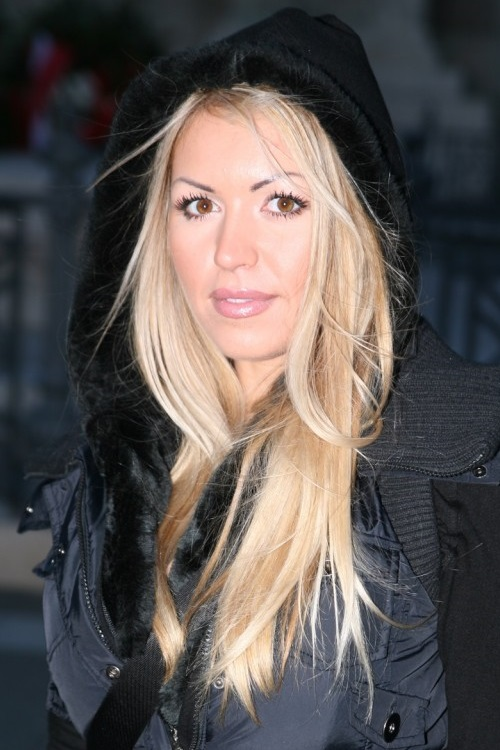
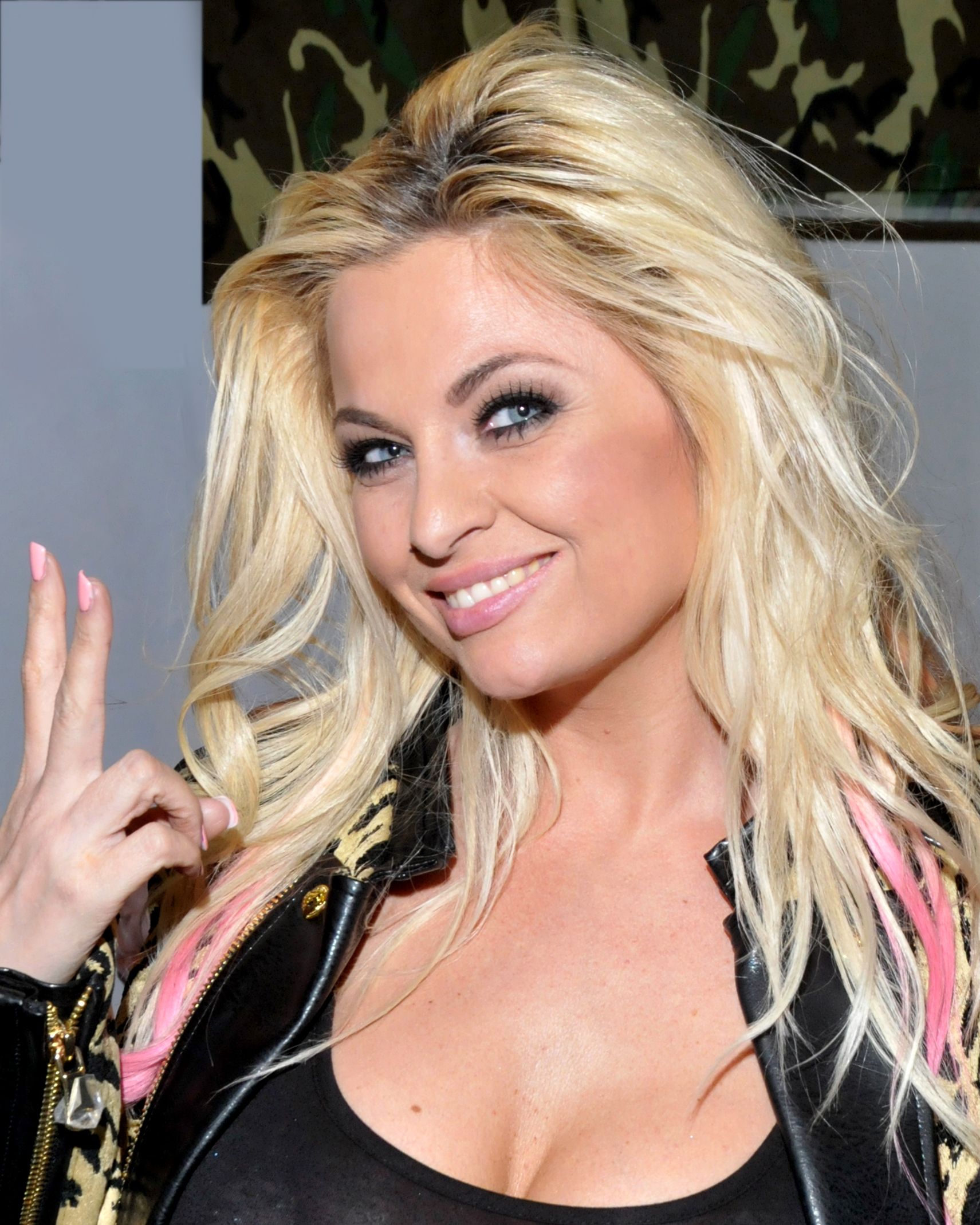
Models Anette Dawn and Bobbi Eden have been featured in Paul Raymond's publications.

Early issues of Paul Raymond's Men Only often included serious articles and interviews, though since the 1980s these have largely been omitted. Photographers from the early years included Fred Enke, R. B. Kane, Harrison Marks, Bob Carlos Clarke, and more recently Bob Twigg. Models have included Mary Millington, Jo Guest, Anette Dawn, Linsey Dawn McKenzie, and Bobbi Eden. Over the years, models featured in Men Only have also appeared in different photoshoots in Paul Raymond's Club International (a title bought from IPC Magazines). Centerfold models were called Men Only Girl or Men Only Miss.

In September 2012, Paul Chapin purchased the Paul Raymond Publications stable of magazines, including Men Only, Mayfair, and Club International on behalf of Blue Media Publishing Group. Blue Publishing, however, entered administration a year later.

The publishers of Men Only also publish Club International, Escort, Mayfair, Men's World and Razzle. Their magazines are available in most newsagents, although some larger retailers require a modesty bag to protect minors from seeing nudity on the cover.

Men Only is also sold in digital format at the main Paul Raymond website. Digital sales initially took place via the Paul Raymond digital newsstand from 2013 until that website closed.

== Sources ==
- Robbins, Fred (1975). "Men Only Interview with Lynne Frederick". Men Only magazine: 18–22.
