= God's Own Junkyard =

British neon lights business and gallery

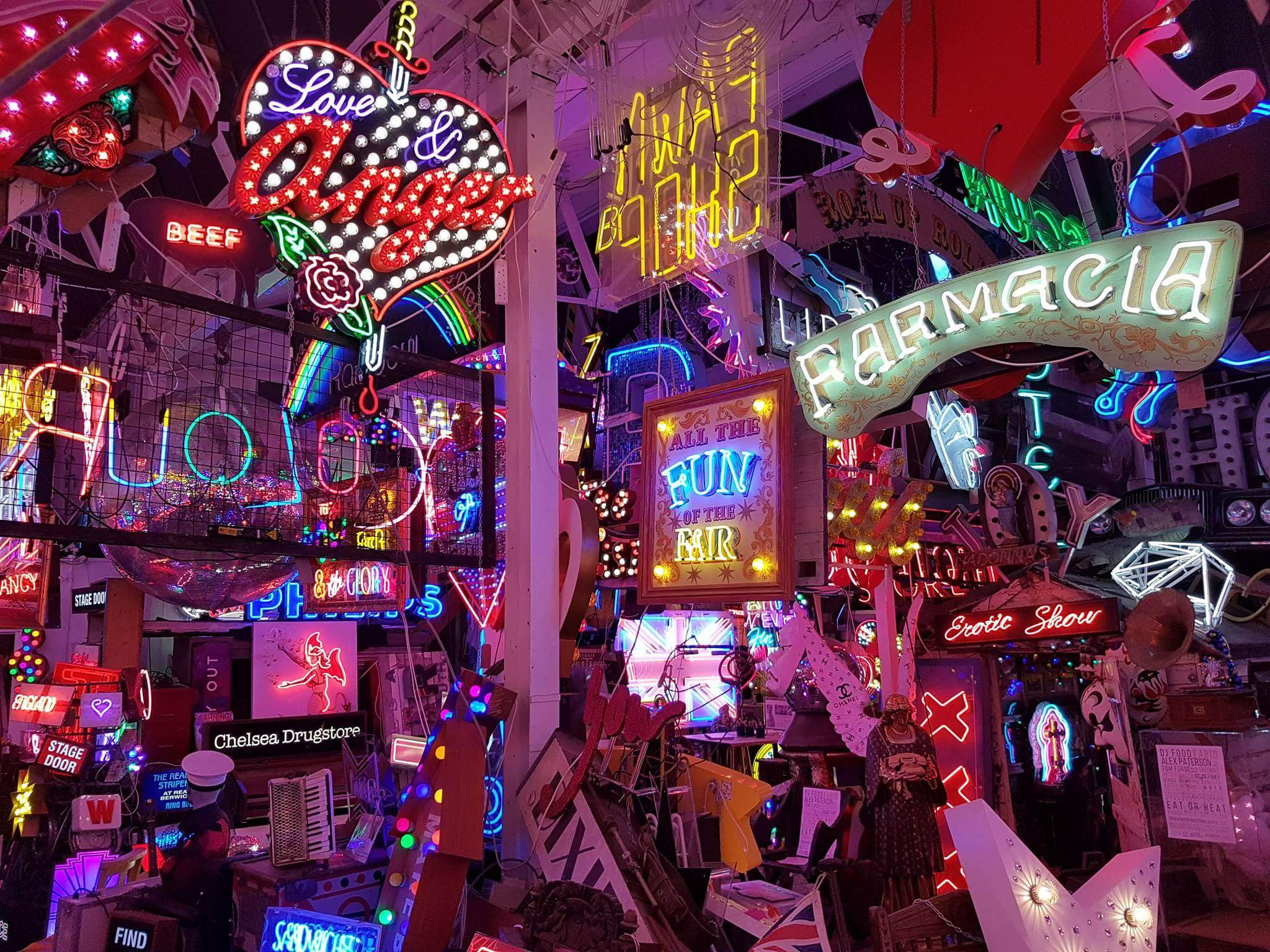
The God's Own Junkyard gallery in 2017

God's Own Junkyard is a British family business that creates neon signs. A gallery of neon signs is maintained by the business in Walthamstow, London.

Founded as Electro Signs by Richard "Dick" Bracey in 1952, the business created signs for Raymond Revuebar and Walthamstow Stadium that survive today, still maintained by the company. Richard's son Chris Bracey took over the business, and it increased in popularity, providing signs for nightclubs and strip clubs and later for a number of feature films including Blade Runner (1982), Eyes Wide Shut (1999), and four Batman films including The Dark Knight (2008). Chris Bracey died in 2014 and the business was taken over by his wife Linda and sons Marcus, Matthew and Max Bracey.

== History ==
=== Founding by Richard Bracey ===
God's Own Junkyard was founded by Welsh miner Richard "Dick" Bracey, from Mountain Ash, Rhondda Cynon Taf. Bracey had worked in the Tredegar mines in the 1940s, though according to his grandson hated the work. He travelled to London by horse and cart toward the end of World War II, and joined the Royal Navy to serve on an aircraft carrier. Following this service, he joined Power Neon, a company that sold neon signs, and learned the trade there. In the early 1950s, Bracey left Power Neon to set up his own neon sign company, and in 1952 he established Electro Signs.

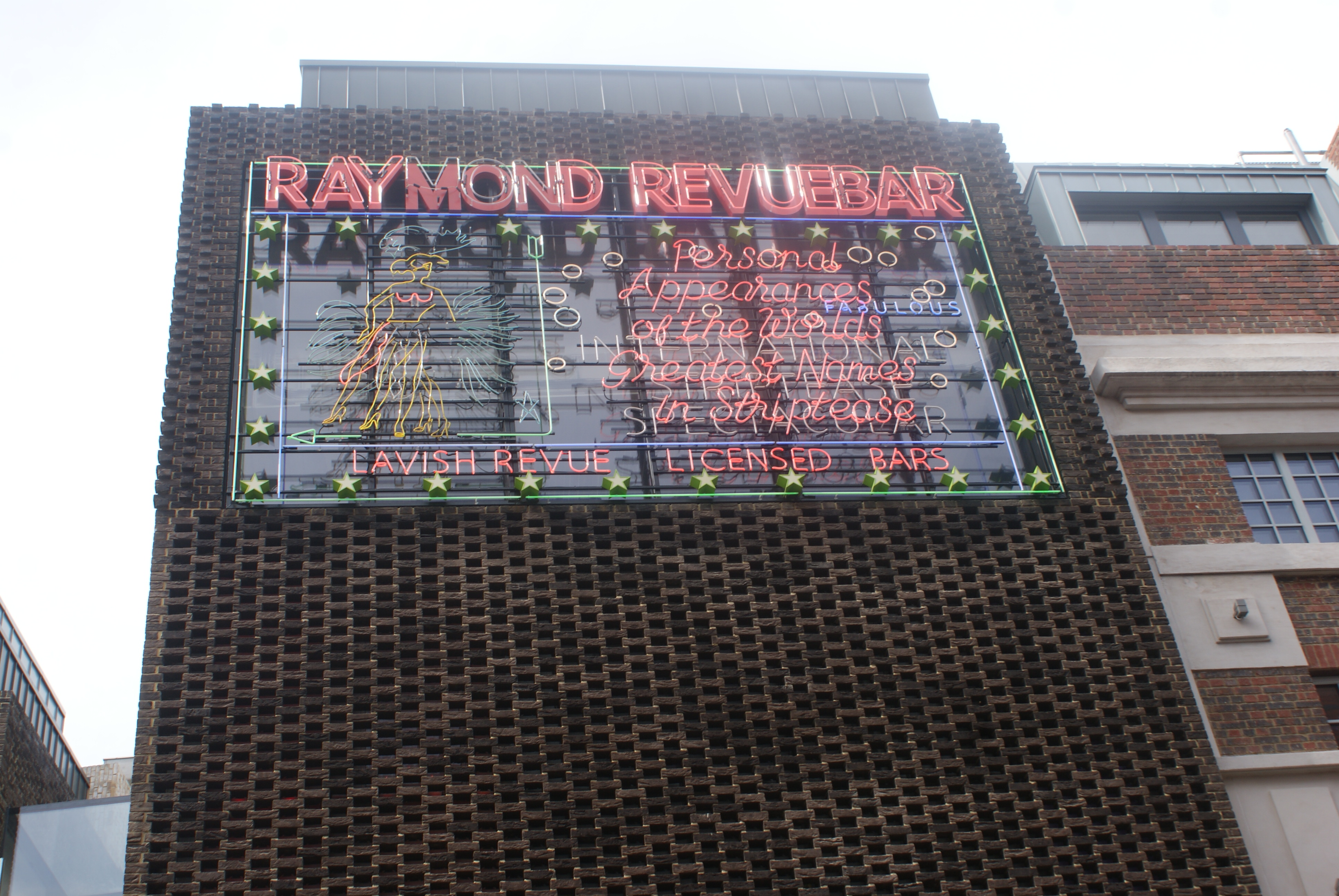
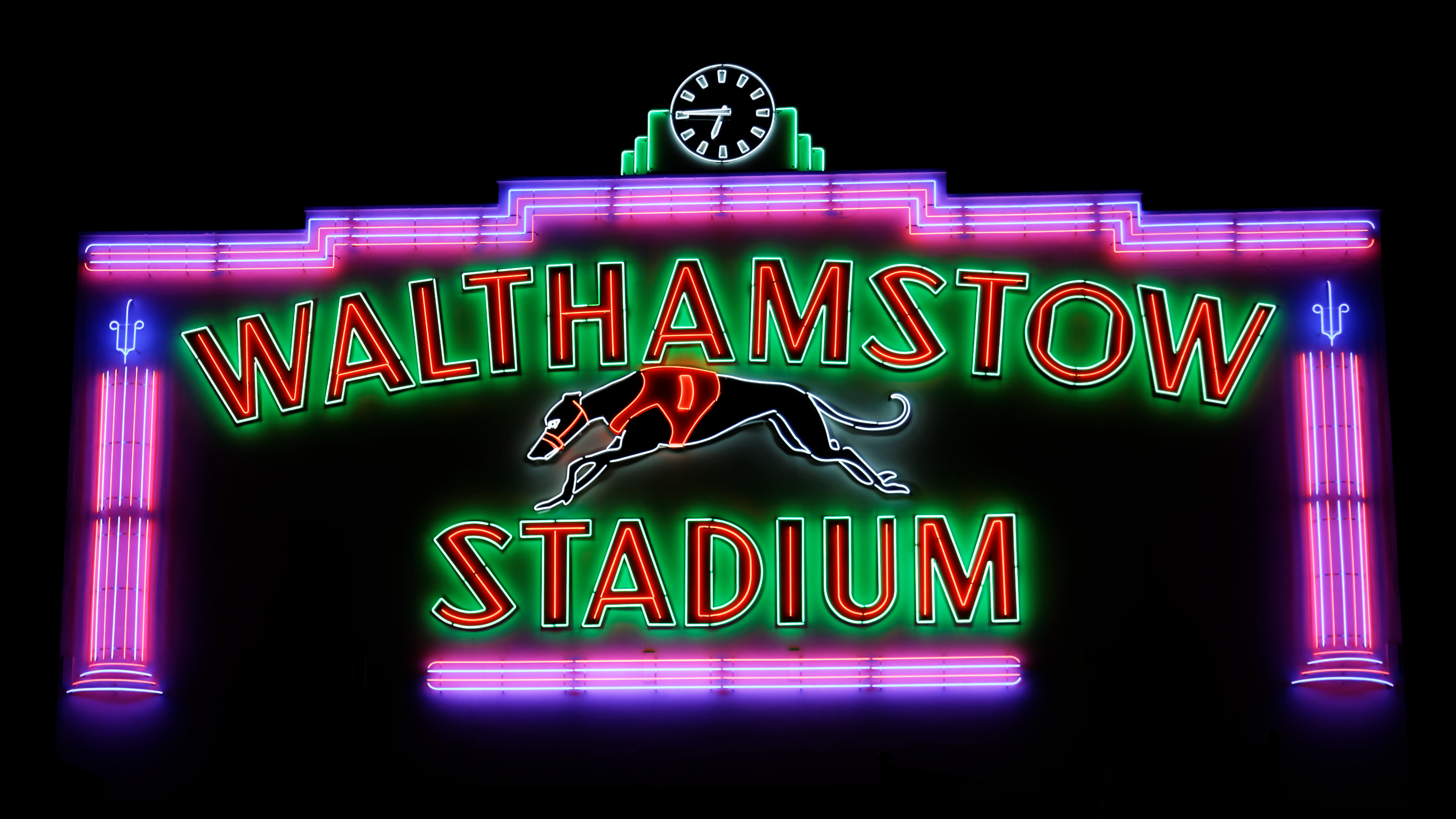
The Raymond Revuebar and Walthamstow Stadium signs by Richard Bracey were still maintained by his family as of 2023

In 1958, the Soho theatre and strip club Raymond Revuebar commissioned a sign from Bracey's company; as of 2023, this sign was still being maintained by God's Own Junkyard, being their biggest surviving sign. Walthamstow Stadium, when it was a dog racing venue, also commissioned a sign from Bracey. This sign also remains and as of 2023 was the only listed neon sign in the United Kingdom, also still maintained by God's Own Junkyard. From the 1970s, Richard Bracey's son Chris, who had begun his career as a graphic designer, began working with the company. In 1973, Chris married Linda Bracey, and she worked alongside him.

=== Under Chris Bracey ===
Chris Bracey later took over the business. He built a garage from which the business would operate, initially producing around one sign per week. Chris, who later became known as the "neon man", worked to convince nightclub and strip club owners to replace their red lights with his technicolor displays. He has stated that he "did 99% of every sex establishment in Soho for 20 years." Chris Bracey's son Matthew has attributed "all the red sort of striptease and peep show signs", as well as the slogan "girls, girls, girls", to his father. Chris became well known in fashion and retail, for which he created catwalk and in-store displays for fashion labels and department stores. The business made signs for the films Blade Runner (1982), Mona Lisa (1986), Eyes Wide Shut (1999), Lara Croft: Tomb Raider (2001), Charlie and the Chocolate Factory (2005), and four Batman films including Batman (1989) and The Dark Knight (2008). Bracey's work appeared in the music videos for Blur's "She's So High" (1990) and Pulp's "Common People" (1995), and was commissioned by celebrities including Jude Law, Kate Moss, Lady Gaga, the business has also sold works to Grayson Perry, Jamie Oliver, Daisy Lowe, and the Beckhams.

Bracey kept the film backdrops as well as discarded shop signs and religious statues in a warehouse in Walthamstow. In 2013, Chris Bracey staged a solo exhibition titled I've Looked Up to Heaven And Been Down to Hell, which showed in the United States and United Kingdom.

=== Under Marcus, Matthew and Max Bracey ===
Chris Bracey died from prostate cancer on 1 November 2014 at age 59, and his sons Matthew, Marcus and Max took over the business, with Linda Bracey stating that the business would continue "as Chris planned and wanted". In 2015 the exhibition My Generation at the Lights of Soho Gallery displayed the neon work of all three generations in the business. The warehouse as of 2023 is free of charge to enter and holds over 1,500 neon pieces which include movie props and vintage signs for fun fairs and circuses.
