= Pornographic magazine =

Magazines that contain content of an explicitly sexual nature

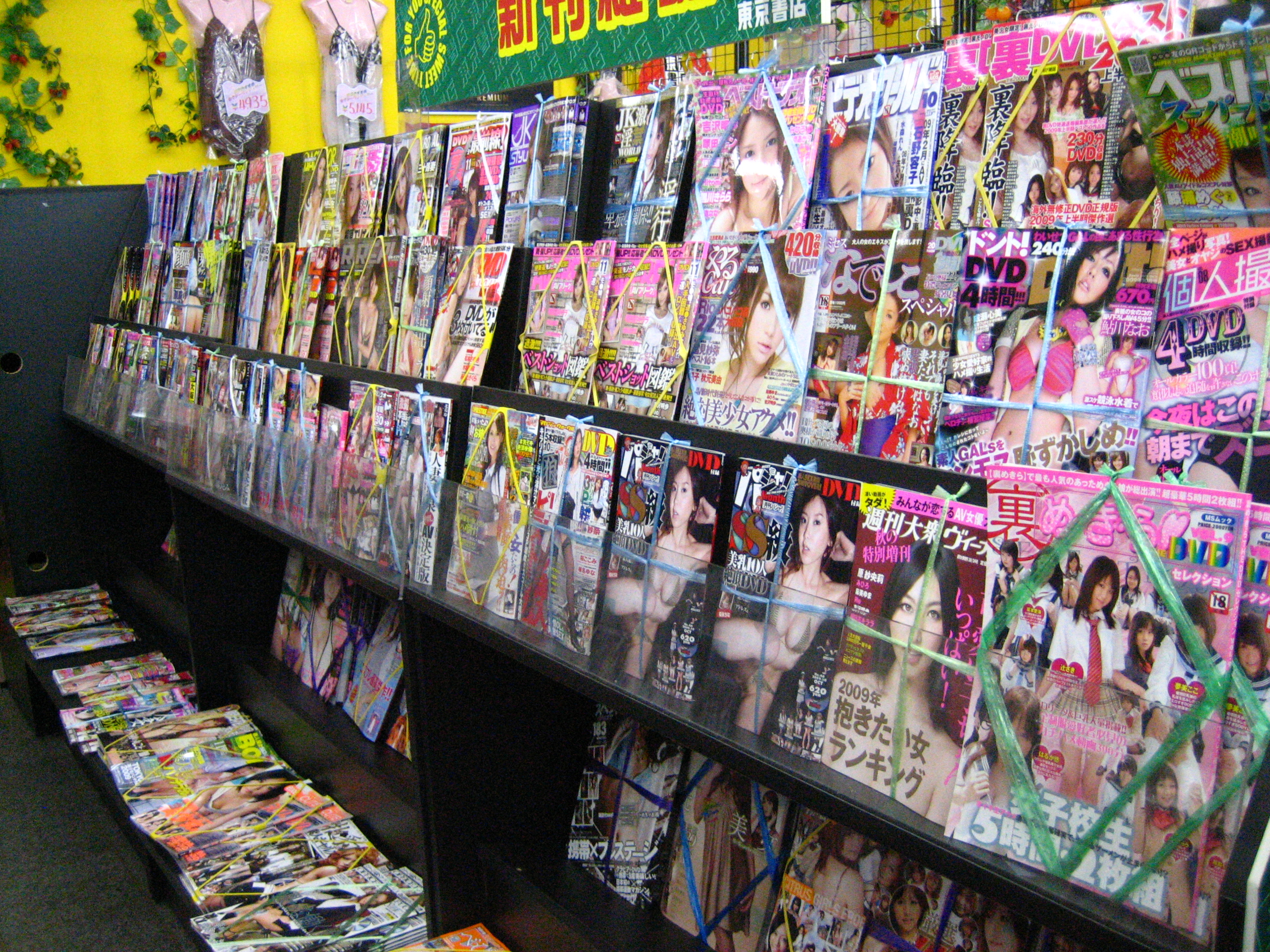
Pornographic magazines on shelves in Japan

Pornographic magazines or erotic magazines, sometimes known as adult magazines or sex magazines, are magazines that contain content of a sexually explicit nature. Softcore pornography magazines contain images – usually photographs – of fully or partially naked people. Hardcore pornography magazines also include explicit depictions of sexual acts such as masturbation, oral sex, manual sex, vaginal sex, or anal sex. Pornographic fetish magazines are also sometimes classified as hardcore.

They primarily serve to stimulate sexual arousal and are often used as an aid to masturbation. Some magazines are general in their content, while others may be more specific and focus on a particular pornographic niche, part of the anatomy, or model characteristics. Examples include Asian Babes which focuses on Asian women, or Leg Show which concentrates on women's legs. Well-known adult magazines include Playboy, Penthouse, Playgirl, and Hustler. Magazines may also carry articles on topics including cars, humor, science, computers, culture, and politics. With the continued progression of print media to digital, retailers have also had to adapt. Software such as Apple's discontinued Newsstand enabled the downloading and displaying of digital versions of magazines but did not allow pornographic material. However, there are specific digital newsstands for pornographic magazines.

== History ==
Pornographic magazines form a part of the history of erotic depictions. It is a form for the display and dissemination of these materials.

In 1880, halftone printing was used to reproduce photographs inexpensively for the first time. The invention of halftone printing took pornography and erotica in new directions at the beginning of the 20th century. The new printing processes allowed photographic images to be reproduced easily in black and white, whereas printers were previously limited to engravings, woodcuts, and line cuts for illustrations. It allowed pornography to become mass-market, making it more affordable and more easily acquired than any previous form.

First appearing in France, the new magazines featured nude and semi-nude photographs on the cover and throughout; often, burlesque actresses were hired as models. While they would later be termed softcore, they were quite shocking for the time. The publications soon either masqueraded as "art magazines" or publications celebrating the new cult of naturism, with titles such as Photo Bits, Body in Art, Figure Photography, Nude Living, and Modern Art for Men. The British magazine Health & Efficiency (now H&E naturist, often known simply as H&E) was first published in 1900, and began to include articles about naturism in the late 1920s. Gradually, this material came to dominate – particularly as other magazines were taken over and absorbed. At times in its post-WWII history, H&E has catered primarily to the soft-porn market.

Another early form of pornography were comic books known as Tijuana bibles that began appearing in the U.S. in the 1920s and lasted until the publishing of glossy colour men's magazines. They were crude hand-drawn scenes often using popular characters from cartoons and culture.

In the 1940s, the word "pinup" was coined to describe pictures torn from men's magazines and calendars and "pinned up" on the wall by U.S. soldiers in World War II. While the 1940s images focused mostly on legs, by the 1950s, the emphasis shifted to breasts. Betty Grable and Marilyn Monroe were two of the most popular pinup models. Monroe continued to be a popular model for the men's magazines in the 1950s.

The 1950s saw the rise of the first mass-market softcore pornographic magazines: Modern Man in 1952 and Playboy in 1953. Hugh Hefner's Playboy started a new style of the men's glossy magazine (or girlie magazine). Hefner coined the term centerfold, and in the first edition of his Playboy used a photograph of a nude Monroe, despite her objections. Another term that became popular with Playboy readers was the "Playboy Playmate". These new-style magazines featured nude or semi-nude women, sometimes simulating masturbation, although their genitals or pubic hair were not actually displayed.

In 1963, Lui started in France to compete against Playboy, while Bob Guccione did the same in the United Kingdom in 1965 with Penthouse. Penthouse's style was different from other magazines, with women looking indirectly at the camera, as if they were going about their private idylls. This change of emphasis influenced erotic depictions of women. Penthouse was also the first magazine to publish pictures that included pubic hair and full frontal nudity, both of which were considered beyond the bounds of the erotic and in the realm of pornography at the time. In 1965, Mayfair was launched in the UK in competition to Playboy and Penthouse. In September 1969 Penthouse was launched in the U.S., bringing new competition to Playboy. In order to retain its market share Playboy followed Penthouse in the display of pubic hair, risking obscenity charges, and launching the "Pubic Wars". As competition between the two magazines escalated, their photos became increasingly more explicit. In the late 1960s, some magazines began to move into more explicit displays often focusing on the buttocks as standards of what could be legally depicted and what readers wanted to see.

By the 1970s magazines containing images of the pubic area became increasingly common. In the UK, Paul Raymond acquired and then relaunched Men Only in 1971 as a pornographic magazine, and then launched Club International in 1972. Playboy was the first to clearly show visible pubic hair in January 1971. The first full frontal nude centerfold was Playboy's Miss January 1972. In 1974, Larry Flynt first published Hustler in the US, which contained more explicit material. Some researchers have detected increasingly violent images in magazines like Playboy and Penthouse over the course of the 1970s, with them then returning to their more upscale style by the end of the decade. Paul Raymond Publications relaunched Escort in 1980 in the UK, Razzle in 1983, and Men's World in 1988.

Sales of pornographic magazines in the U.S. have declined significantly since 1979, with a nearly 50% reduction in circulation between 1980 and 1989. The fact that the U.S. incidence of rape had increased over the same period has cast doubt on any correlation between magazine sales and sex crimes. Studies from the mid-1980s to the early 1990s nearly all confirmed that pornographic magazines contained significantly less violent imagery than pornographic films.

In the 1990s, magazines such as Hustler began to feature more hardcore material such as sexual penetration, lesbianism and homosexuality, group sex, masturbation, and fetishes. In the late 1990s and 2000s the pornographic magazines market declined, as they were challenged by new "lad mags" such as FHM and Loaded, which featured softcore photos. The availability of pornographic DVDs and internet pornography also led to a decline in magazine sales. Many magazines developed their own websites which also show pornographic films. Despite falling sales, the top-selling U.S. adult magazines still maintain high circulations compared to most mainstream magazines, and are amongst the top-selling magazines of any type.

By 2001, Paul Raymond Publications dominated the British adult magazine market, distributing eight of the ten top selling adult magazines in the UK. At that time, there were about 100 adult magazine titles on sale in the UK.

== Common features ==
In the late 20th century, several magazines featured photos of "ordinary" women submitted by readers, for example the Readers Wives sections of several British magazines such as Fiesta, and Beaver Hunt in the US. Many magazines also featured supposed stories of their reader's sexual exploits, many of which were actually written by the magazines' writers. Many magazines contained a high number of advertisements for phone sex lines, which provided them with an important source of revenue.

== Gay magazines ==
An early example of borderline gay pornography was the physique magazine, a genre which had wide circulation in the 1950s and 1960s. Physique magazines mostly consisted of photographs of attractive, scantily-clad young men, and occasionally homoerotic illustrations by gay artists like George Quaintance and Tom of Finland. The magazines contained no overt mentions or depictions of homosexuality and used the pretense of demonstrating bodybuilding techniques or providing photos as visual references for artists, but it was widely understood that they were purchased almost exclusively by gay men. Major examples of the genre include Physique Pictorial (the first of its kind, debuting in 1951), Tomorrow's Man, and Grecian Guild Pictorial.

Shifts in the judicial interpretation of obscenity in the US and elsewhere led to physique magazines being supplanted in the mid-to-late 1960s by new publications which openly acknowledged a gay audience and featured nudity, and later hardcore sex.

== Production, distribution, and retail ==
A successful magazine requires significant investment in production facilities and a distribution network. They require large printing presses and numerous specialized employees, such as graphic designers and typesetters. Today a new magazine start-up can cost as much as $20 million, and magazines are significantly more expensive to produce than pornographic films, and more expensive than internet pornography.

Like all magazines, pornographic magazines are dependent on advertising revenue, which may force a magazine to tone down its content.

Depending on the laws in each jurisdiction, pornographic magazines may be sold in convenience stores, newsagents and petrol stations. They may need to be sold on the top shelf of a retail display to prevent children reaching them, hence their euphemistic name top shelf magazines. Alternatively it may be necessary to sell them under the counter or in plastic wrappers. Some retail chains and many independent retail outlets do not stock pornographic magazines. They may also be sold in sex shops or by mail order.

== See also ==
- Fetish magazine
- Glamour photography
- History of erotic depictions
- List of pornographic magazines
- Pubic Wars

== Bibliography ==
- Hanson, Dian (2004). Dian Hanson's The History of Men's Magazines vol. 1 From 1900 to Post WW II. Taschen. ISBN 978-3822822296.
- Hanson, Dian (2004). Dian Hanson's The History of Men's Magazines vol. 2 From Post-War to 1959. Taschen. ISBN 978-3822826256.
- Hanson, Dian (2005). Dian Hanson's The History of Men's Magazines vol. 3 1960s at the newsstand. Taschen. ISBN 978-3822829769.
- Hanson, Dian (2005). Dian Hanson's The History of Men's Magazines vol. 4 1960s under the counter. Taschen. ISBN 978-3822836354.
- Hanson, Dian (2005). Dian Hanson's The History of Men's Magazines vol. 5 1970s at the newsstand. Taschen. ISBN 978-3822836361.
- Hanson, Dian (2005). Dian Hanson's The History of Men's Magazines vol. 6 1970s under the counter. Taschen. ISBN 978-3822836378.
- Kimmel, Michael S. (2005). The gender of desire: essays on male sexuality. SUNY Press. ISBN 978-0-7914-6337-6.
- Pendergast, Tom (2000). Creating the Modern Man: American Magazines and Consumer Culture, 1900-1950. University of Missouri Press. ISBN 9780826262240.
