= Escort (magazine) =

British pornographic magazine

- Escort Magazine Vol. 25, No. 2
- Editor: Jim Harris
- Categories: Pornographic magazine
- Frequency: Monthly
- Publisher: City Magazines (1958–1971); Paul Raymond Publications (1971–present)
- First issue: 1980; 46 years ago
- Company: Blue Active Media Ltd
- Country: United Kingdom
- Language: English
- Website: www.paulraymond.xxx/magazines/escort.html
- ISSN: 0952-6706
- OCLC: 60832552

Escort is a British men's softcore adult magazine featuring erotica published monthly by Blue Active Media Ltd. It is published by Paul Raymond Publications, a company that also publishes a number of similar magazines, including Club International, Mayfair, Men Only, Men's World, and Razzle. The origin of these titles lies in businessman Paul Raymond's expansion from strip club management into magazine publishing in the 1960s.

== Publication history ==
A monthly pin-up magazine with the title Escort was published between 1958 and 1971 by City Magazines. The title was acquired by Raymond, and from 1971 to 1980 was incorporated into another title he had acquired from City Magazines, Men Only.

In 1980, Raymond began publishing Escort as a top-shelf magazine with the revived title. By 2012, Escort was in its 32nd year, or volume. The magazine is also sold in digital format. Initially this was via the Paul Raymond digital newsstand from 2013 until that website closed. Subsequently it has been available digitally from the publisher's main website.

== Content ==
The magazine's content is a combination of photographs and text, with the photographs almost entirely being those of partially or completely nude women.

Escort specialises in pictures of amateur (i.e. non-professional) models, some of which are sent to the magazine by readers – these are described as "readers' wives". It often features photo-shoots taken in an "ordinary" location like a pub, or outdoors at a place familiar to British readers.

In 2008 Stephen Bleach, who had worked as publishing director for Paul Raymond Publications, described Escort as "cheerfully brazen" in contrast to Club International and Men Only, which he described as "pseudo-glamorous". In 2013 Escort was described by Pierre Perrone, a former magazine editor for the company, as "downmarket".

== See also ==
- List of pornographic magazines
- Outline of British pornography
- Pornography in the United Kingdom
