= Mayfair (magazine) =

British pornographic magazine

- January 2008 cover featuring Anette Dawn
- Editor: Matt Berry
- Categories: Pornography, entertainment
- Frequency: Monthly
- Publisher: Paul Raymond Publications
- Founded: 1966
- First issue: August 1966; 60 years ago
- Company: Blue Active Media Ltd
- Country: United Kingdom
- Language: English
- Website: paulraymond.xxx

Mayfair is a British adult magazine published monthly by Paul Raymond Publications. Founded in 1966, it was designed as a response to US magazines such as Playboy and Penthouse, the latter of which had recently launched in the UK. For many years, it claimed the largest distribution of any men's magazine in the UK. It is a softcore magazine, and thus is available in newsagents, although some larger retailers require a modesty bag to hide the cover.

== Fisk Publishing era ==
Mayfair was launched by Fisk Publishing Ltd in 1966 with an August cover date. The company was controlled by Brian Fisk. Its first editor was David Campbell, and its first deputy editor was Graham Masterton. Its second editor was Woman's Own veteran Kenneth Bound. As well as nudes, Mayfair featured short stories and serious articles on such "male" interests as classic cars, trains, and military history. In its early years, one regular contributor of fiction and nonfiction was American author William S. Burroughs (who became an associate of Masterton's; Masterton later gave Burroughs a posthumous co-author credit on his novel Rules of Duel).

In 1968, Mayfair took over rival King, which had been launched in 1964, initially with backing from Paul Raymond.

A regular feature for many years was Quest, "the laboratory of human response", interviews purportedly with ordinary people (each issue featuring separate conversations with two women and one man, and occasionally couples) about sexual matters, and graphic descriptions of sexual encounters. Graham Masterton initially wrote Quest as fiction, but later interviewed real people to inform the article.

Another regular feature was a long-running cartoon strip featuring the misadventures of Carrie, a nubile blonde who lost her clothes in various embarrassing situations. Beginning in August 1972, the comic-strip had a story and fully painted artwork by Don Lawrence. The strip ran for two pages a month for most issues over the next 17 years. Don Lawrence left at the end of 1975, and Mario Capaldi drew the strip from January 1976 to May 1977. In June 1977, Steve Kingston took over.

The December issue of each year was usually double-sized, and featured a "review" of the models seen in previous issues. For many years, this was from the previous year, e.g. the review in Volume 16, Number 12 (December 1981) featured the models seen throughout Volume 15 (January to December 1980). In 1982, a separate and nominally annual Best of Mayfair supplement was introduced, reprinting the full photo sets and other items. This was followed in 1988 by a similar Girls of Summer supplement.

Most of the models featured were "girl next door" types whom the accompanying text claimed to be new to such work. Their pictures would be accompanied by descriptions of their everyday lives and jobs, including that of telephonists, secretaries, shopkeepers, etc. There were also regular appearances by Page 3 girls – models who had appeared topless in tabloid newspapers such as The Sun. Initially some of these models appeared nude in the magazine, but by the late 1980s most of them, such as Samantha Fox and Maria Whittaker, would only appear topless.

Occasionally couples, male and female models and sets of two or more girls together (though lesbianism was usually implied rather than made obvious) were featured.

In March 1982, Robert Maxwell reached an agreement to buy Mayfair from Yvonne Fisk (widow of founder Brian). However, Bound persuaded Maxwell to let him mount a management buyout, instead.

Many aspects of the magazine changed when Kenneth Bound agreed to sell the magazine to Paul Raymond Publications. The last issue from Bound/Fisk was Volume 26 Number 1 (January 1991), at which time the magazine had a net paid circulation of 295,646 according to the UK Audit Bureau of Circulations.

== Paul Raymond Publications era ==
The change of ownership and the appointment of Stephen Bleach as editor led to more explicitness, more girl-on-girl material, and a focus on established models, mostly with large-breasted figures. The detailed description of the girls' "everyday lives" gave way to explicit descriptions of their sex lives.

The serious content was gradually dropped in favour of an approach more akin to mainstream magazines such as Loaded, while the male interviewees in Quest were dropped in favour of more extreme female-only contributions, including lesbianism.

Today, Mayfair is published every four weeks along with fellow Paul Raymond adult titles such as Club International, Escort, Men Only, Men's World, and Razzle.

Paul Chaplin, also known as Paul Baxendale-Walker, acquired ownership of the Paul Raymond Publications titles in August 2012.

Mayfair is also sold in digital format. Initially this was via the Paul Raymond digital newsstand from 2013 until that website closed. Subsequently it has been available digitally from the main Paul Raymond website.

== Legal issues ==
In common with many soft-core publications, Mayfair was specifically banned in Ireland in 1968, and remained so until successfully appealed along with four other Paul Raymond titles on 21 November 2011.

For many years, Mayfair occasionally featured models who were 16 or 17 years old, as under the Protection of Children Act 1978, a "child" for the purposes of prohibited "indecent" photographs was someone under the age of 16. This was changed to 18 under the Sexual Offences Act 2003, making the relevant pages of past magazines retrospectively illegal as child pornography.

The March 1987 issue featured a model named Tina Reid, stating she had only recently turned 17 when the pictures were taken. When it emerged that she was actually 15, all copies were withdrawn from UK shops and pulped. Nevertheless, Reid later appeared in a number of other glamour magazines (sometimes using the pseudonym of "Trixie Buckingham"), as well as acting under the name Louise Germaine, notably in Dennis Potter's Lipstick on Your Collar and Midnight Movie.

== Contents ==
Current issues of the magazine (2011) follow a common monthly format consisting of several regular sections and seven photo shoots, six of which are brand new to print in the UK and the last being a rerun of a classic photo shoot from yesteryear. The contents below is representative of this format:

1. Mayfair Male – This section contains letters from readers.
2. Mayfair Presents – A profile of a model or porn star, looking at how she got into the industry, and how (and who!) she has been doing since
3. 21st Century Toys – This is a light-hearted review of electronic gadgets and gizmos
4. Mayfair Movies – A review of the latest batch of pornographic movies
5. Mayfair Motors – A double-page review focusing on a new car – often featuring high-performance vehicles
6. Quest – Stories about the sexual activities of a trio of young women, each following a general theme given in the previous month's issue
7. Scene – A section containing reviews and write-ups about various differing new releases – typically DVDs and books
8. Gentlemen.. – A page of jokes, generally of a groan-inducing nature
9. Mayfair Intelligencer – A round-up of weird and mysterious facts, coupled with askew glances at the world of celebrity and Hollywood and guides to modern etiquette

Nude photo shoots are scattered between these sections; each photo shoot generally consists of six or seven pages of photographs along with a short write-up about the model. Often, the model starts the set fully dressed and ends up fully naked.

The final photo shoot in the magazine is a classic shoot that is taken from a previous issue of the magazine, typically from the 1980s or early '90s.

A single-page comic strip, "Ms. Fortune" by Gabrielle Noble, has featured since 2011.

Since acquiring ownership in August 2012, Paul Chaplin writes the monthly editorial column, complemented by his own photo shoot of current glamour models. Chaplin has also implemented an editorial change in bringing in more mainstream tabloid page 3 models for shoots.

== Featured models past and present ==
- Joanie Allum (wife of photographer John Allum, she later became a glamour photographer)
- Mel Appleby (of Mel and Kim)
- Debee Ashby
- Brigitte Barclay
- Paula Ann Bland
- Claire Cass
- Donna Ewin
- Samantha Fox
- Jo Guest
- Kirsten Imrie
- Linda Lusardi
- Barbara Lidford
- Sabrina Salerno
- Joan Templeman (wife of Richard Branson)
- Tula (Caroline Cossey)
- Maria Whittaker
- Marina Larsen, described on cover Vol.17, No. 12 (December 1982) as '...the most beautiful girl we've ever seen'
- Lesley-Anne Down
- Penny Irving
- Gail Harris (Gail Thackary)
- Nina Carter also credited as Penny Mallett

== Featured photographers ==
- Peter Flodquist
- John Allum (whose wife Joanie Allum appeared in some issues of Mayfair)
- Donald Milne
- Ed Alexander
- Jean Rougeron
- Michael Ancher
- Robert Redman

== See also ==
- Outline of British pornography
- Pornography in the United Kingdom
