= Fiesta (magazine) =

British pornographic magazine (1966–2020)

- Fiesta vol 28 issue 4. The covergirl is Charmaine Sinclair.
- Categories: Pornographic magazine
- Frequency: Monthly
- Format: 8.5" × 11"
- First issue: 1966; 60 years ago
- Final issue: 2020
- Company: Galaxy Publications Limited
- Country: United Kingdom
- Language: English
- ISSN: 0265-1270
- OCLC: 877750950

Fiesta was a British monthly magazine featuring softcore pornography which was published by Galaxy Publications. It was a sister publication of Knave magazine, launched two years later.

Launched in 1966 by the British photographer Russell Gay, Fiesta called itself "the magazine for men which women love to read" and quickly became Britain's top-selling adult magazine. In the early 1970s it introduced Readers' Wives, a feature that has since been copied by a number of other pornographic magazines. This feature included a "Readers' Wives Striptease" section with photographs of a woman said to be a wife or girlfriend of a reader. The photographs, taken by the magazine, showed her undressing to full nudity, often out of everyday clothing. The Readers' Wives section was the subject of a song by John Cooper Clarke on his album Disguise in Love.

As well as its Readers' Wives pictures and photographic sets of female models, Fiesta contained readers' letters from men and women. There were also male-interest features, cartoons and reviews, sexy puzzles and a regular erotic horoscope, together with Firkin, a cartoon strip drawn in the style of underground comics by Hunt Emerson and written by Tym Manley.

Mary Millington modelled for the magazine in 1974, prior to her exclusive signing to work for David Sullivan's magazines.

Nicholas Whittaker, journalist and author of Platform Souls, Blue Period and Sweet Talk, worked for the company from 1980 to 1982, when he left to go and work for Paul Raymond Publications, where he played a major role in establishing the new Razzle magazine. His experiences at Fiesta and Razzle are the subject of his book Blue Period.

Sales of Fiesta were 238,000 in 1991 but had dropped to 162,000 in 1996, mirroring the decline in the market for softcore magazines at that time. Nevertheless, in the mid-2000s it was still the country's top selling adult magazine. Fiesta ceased production in 2020, after 54 years of publication.

== See also ==
- Razzle, its main competitor
- Outline of British pornography
- Pornography in the United Kingdom
