= Walker's Court =

Pedestrian passageway in Soho, London

Coordinates: 51°30′45.32″N 0°8′2.62″W

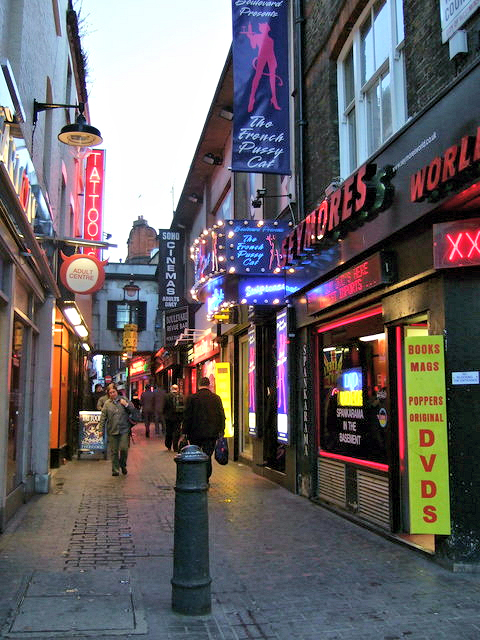
Walker's Court, looking south (2008). The bridgeway between the two sides of the passage can be seen toward the rear of the scene.

Walker's Court is a pedestrian alleyway in the Soho district of the City of Westminster, London. The passage dates from around the early 1700s and escaped modernisation in the late nineteenth century so that it retains its original narrow layout. In the twentieth century the small shops that traded from the alley gradually closed and from the late 1950s the alley became associated with Soho's sex trade. The Raymond Revuebar opened in 1958 and closed in 2004. There are now plans to redevelop the passage.

== Location ==
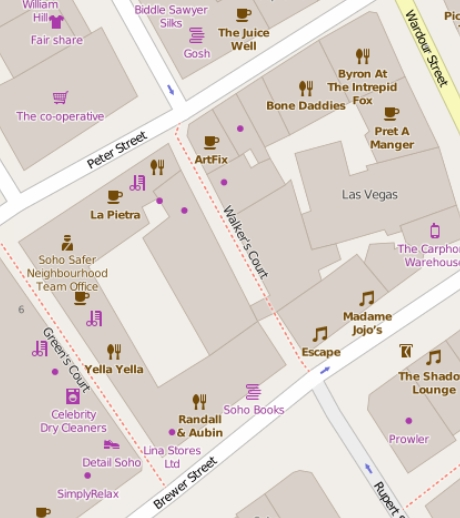
The immediate vicinity of Walker's Court.

The alley is pedestrianised and runs between Peter Street in the north and the junction of east Brewer Street (originally Little Pulteney Street) and Rupert Street in the south. The two sides of Walker's Court are joined halfway down by a privately owned bridgeway that was once part of the Raymond Revuebar.

== Early history ==
The vicinity of Walker's Court was built up in the late seventeenth and early eighteenth centuries. Building leases were granted in the area to a number of tradesmen in 1719 and 1720, one of whom was John Walker of St. Martin's, a bricklayer, but it is uncertain if that is the source of the street name.

== Nineteenth century ==
Walker's Court is shown on Richard Horwood's map of 1813 (3rd edition), by which time the street layout immediately north of Little Pulteney Street (now Brewer Street) was the same as it is today.

From 1873, attempts began to improve the south side of Little Pulteney Street which was described as containing "narrow, ill ventilated Courts and Alleys, some of them open to the sky, but others running under portions of houses". The plans would have joined Rupert Street to Berwick Street in one broad road that would have destroyed narrow Walker's Court in the process but the plans were never carried out on the north side of the street and Walker's Court remains a narrow alley to this day.

== Twentieth century ==
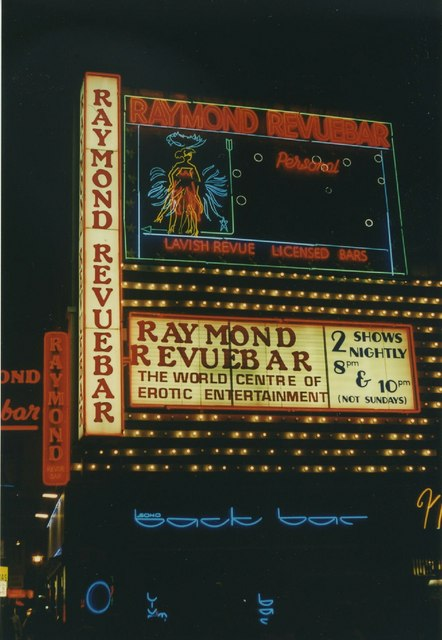
The Raymond Revuebar in Walker's Court. (1997)

In the first half of the twentieth century, Walker's Court was made up of small shops, including an eel pie shop, and a horse butcher that was still trading in the 1950s. Isow's Kosher Restaurant was also located in the street.

In 1958, Paul Raymond opened the Raymond Revuebar (closed 2004), a theatre and strip club at Maurice House, No. 11-12. It is now The Box Soho. Walker's Court is crossed at first floor level by an architecturally distinctive bridge with leaded bay windows which joins the entrance to the theatre to the main auditorium. In recent years a carousel horse and toy car have appeared in the window on the south side and an eclectic selection of objects on the north side which has led to speculation about their meaning.

== Redevelopment plans ==
In 2015, plans were underway for the redevelopment of the immediate area to include a new theatre, retail and nightclub premises. The redevelopment is planned to include new headquarters for Soho Estates.

== Gallery ==
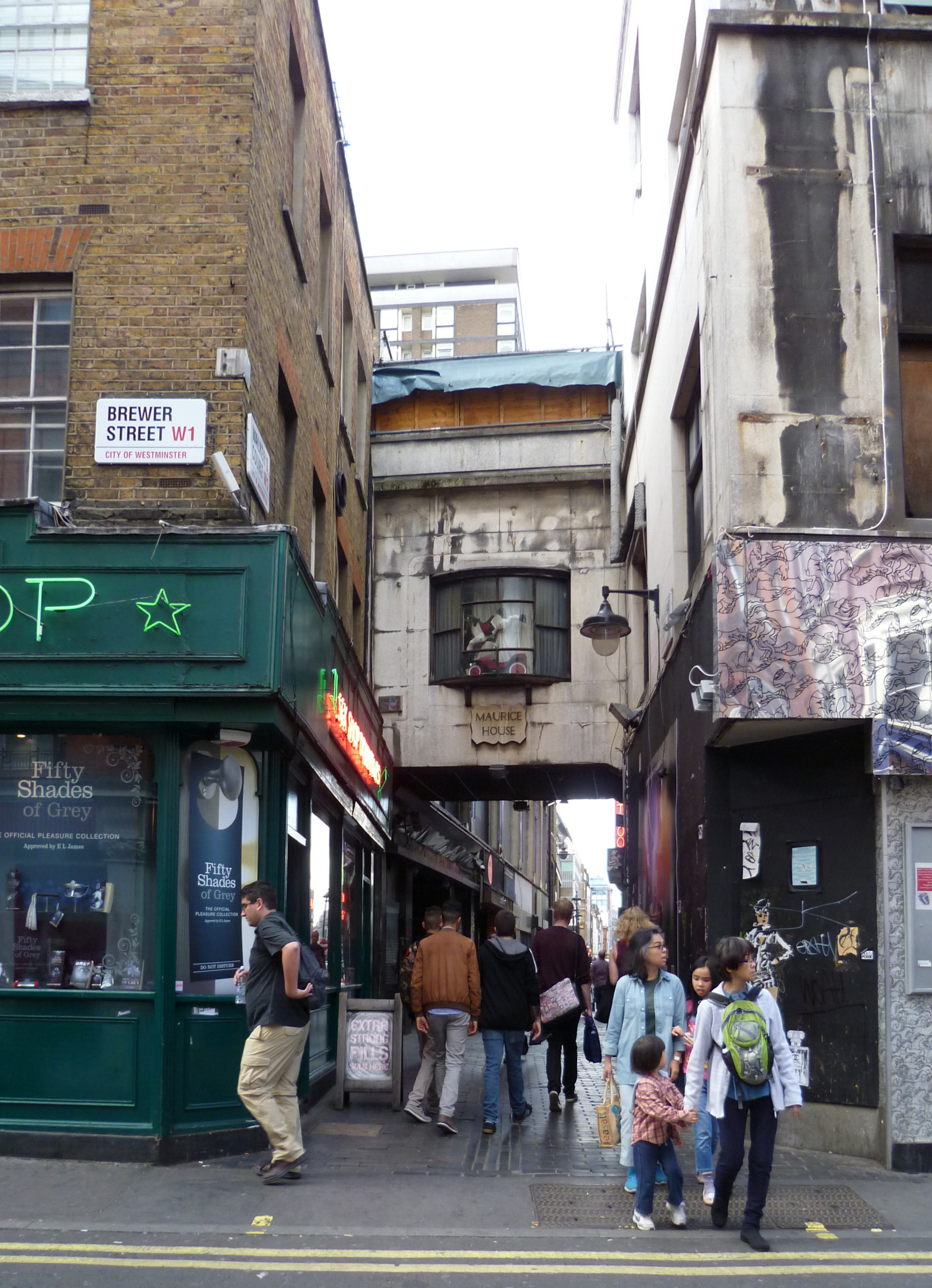
Walker's Court looking north from Brewer Street. (2015)

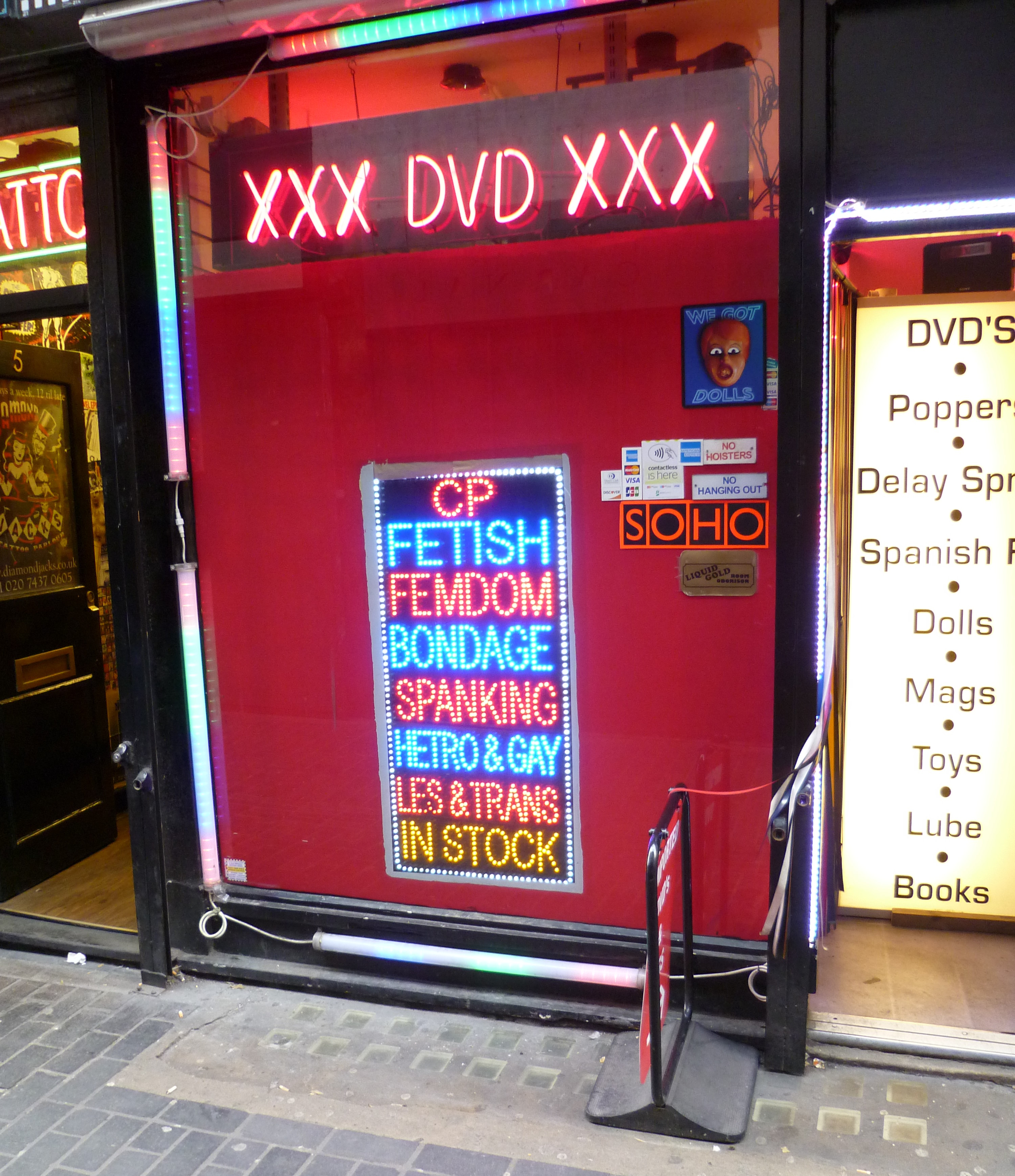
A sex shop in Walker's Court.

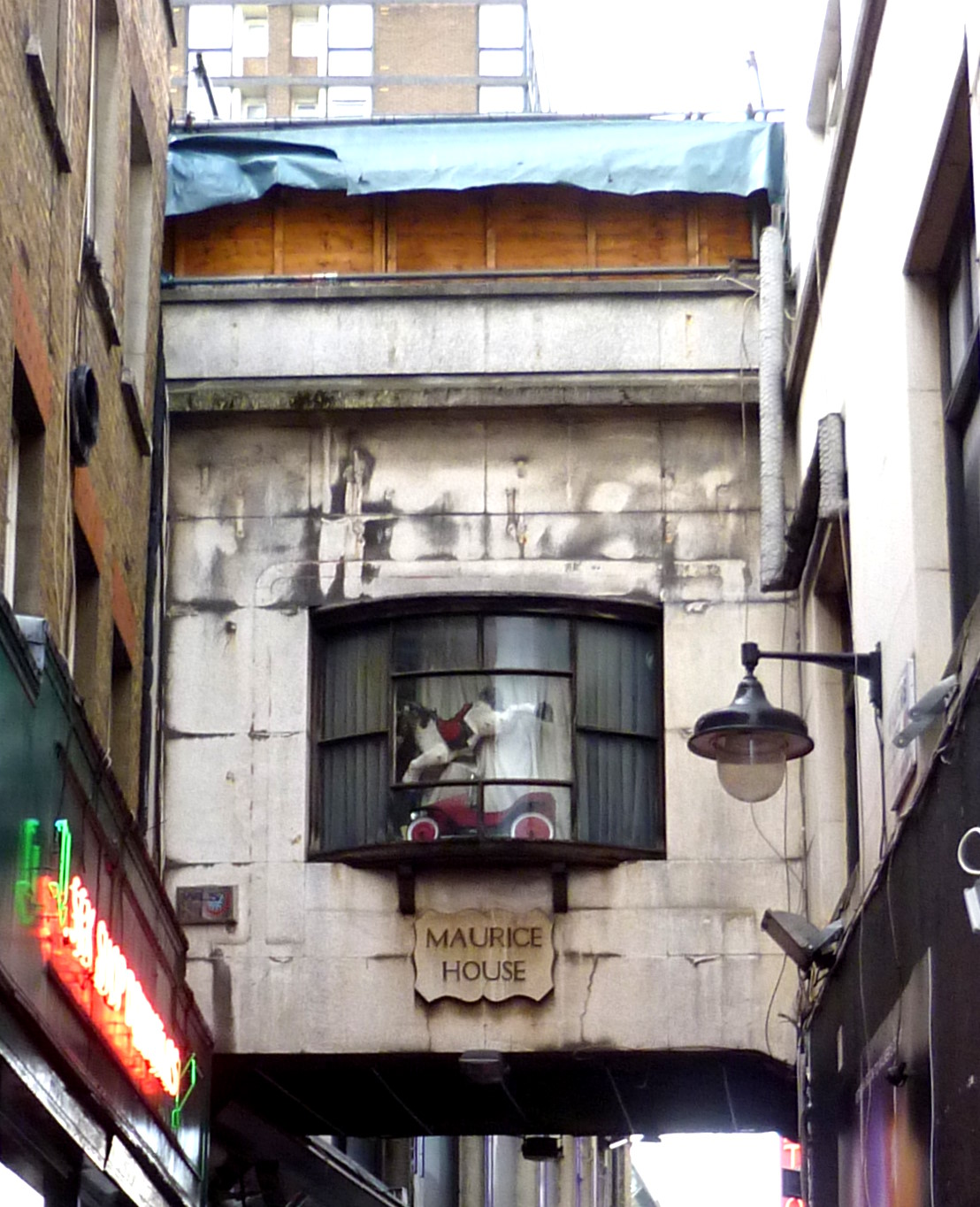
The Maurice House bridge across Walker's Court with carousel horse. (South side)

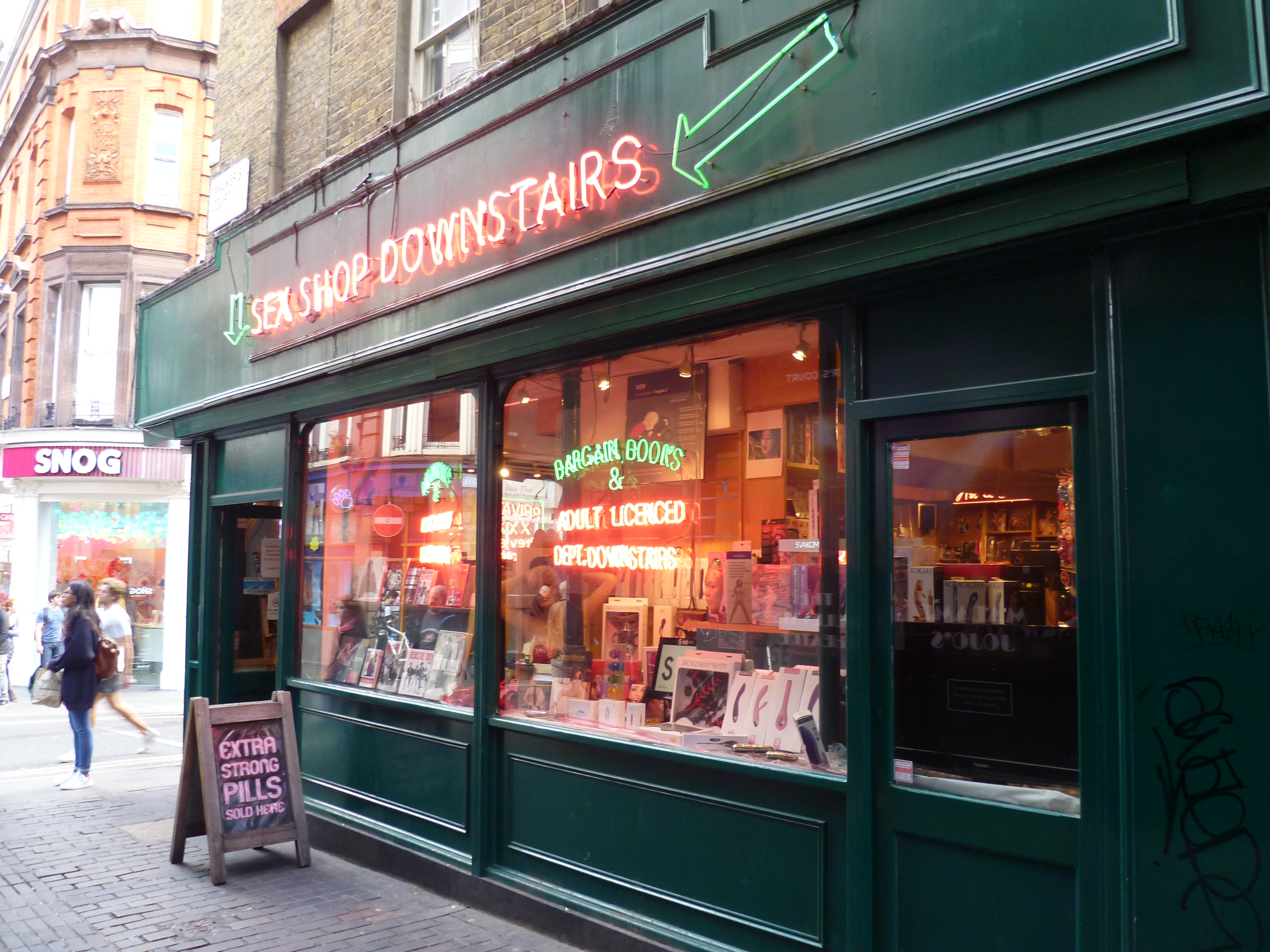
Soho's Original Book Shop on the corner with Brewer Street.
