= Jo Guest =

English media figure (born 1972)

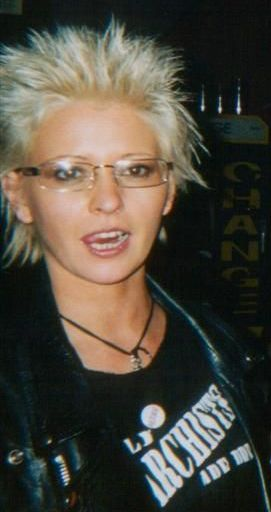
- Guest at Punk Aid 2004
- Born: Joanne Guest; 22 February 1972 (age 54); Chesterfield, Derbyshire, England
- Occupations: Glamour model; media personality
- Height: 1.65 m (5 ft 5 in)

Joanne Guest (born 22 February 1972) is an English former glamour model and media personality.

== Glamour career ==
Born and raised in Chesterfield, north east Derbyshire, England, she grew up on Poplar Drive in Glapwell. She attended the former Heath School (open from 1963 to 1991) on Main Street in Heath, Derbyshire, then studied Hotel Management at Chesterfield College.

Guest started in modelling after she saw an advertisement while on a catering course at her local college. She appeared as a Page 3 girl in The Sun and has appeared in the magazines Loaded and FHM. Her Loaded cover shot was projected onto the Houses of Parliament in May 1998. Guest appeared in the Playboy video Shagalicious British Babes.

Guest appeared in a wide range of British "top shelf" magazines, including, Escort, Mayfair, Men Only, Men's World, Razzle and Whitehouse. From 2000 she was a television host for the Men and Motors cable/satellite channel in the UK, operated by Granada Television.

Guest appeared in an interactive erotic magazine for PC called Interactive Girls. She starred in an erotic PC game called Jo Guest in the Milk Round, released by Interactive Girls Club in 1994.

== Other media work ==
In 1995 Guest appeared in the Damien Hirst directed music video for Blur song "Country House" together with Matt Lucas, Keith Allen and Sara Stockbridge.

In 2002 Guest promoted her proposed move into competitive rally driving.

Starting with the June 2002 issue, Guest had a monthly advice column in Front magazine. She had previously appeared in a weekly "agony babe" advice column in the Daily Star newspaper from November 1998 to March 2000.

Guest hosted a number of television programmes on the Granada Men & Motors cable/satellite channel in the UK. Shows include:

- Jo Guest's Private Parts (Nov 1998)
- Undressed with Guest (the second series was shown in Spring 1999)
- Jo Guest in Jamaica (Jan-Feb 2000)
- Jo Guest’s Capital Exposed (Nov 2002)
- The Steam Room: with Jo Guest (Oct 2004)
- Jo Guest UK Exposed (Nov 2004)
- British Babes Exposed (included The Steam Room: with Jo Guest) (Oct 2008)

Guest appeared in the third series of the British TV show, I'm Famous and Frightened! and in the seventh series, episode one of the British show GamesMaster.

== Illness and retirement from modelling ==
On 21 January 2008, she was a guest on the television show This Morning, during which she discussed a mystery illness she had been suffering from for the past 14 months that had left her unable to work and that doctors had been unable to diagnose. On 10 April 2008 she returned as a guest on This Morning and confirmed that, as a direct result of help from viewers that had seen her previous appearance, she had been diagnosed with fibromyalgia.
