= Bobbi Eden =

Dutch pornographic actress (born 1980)

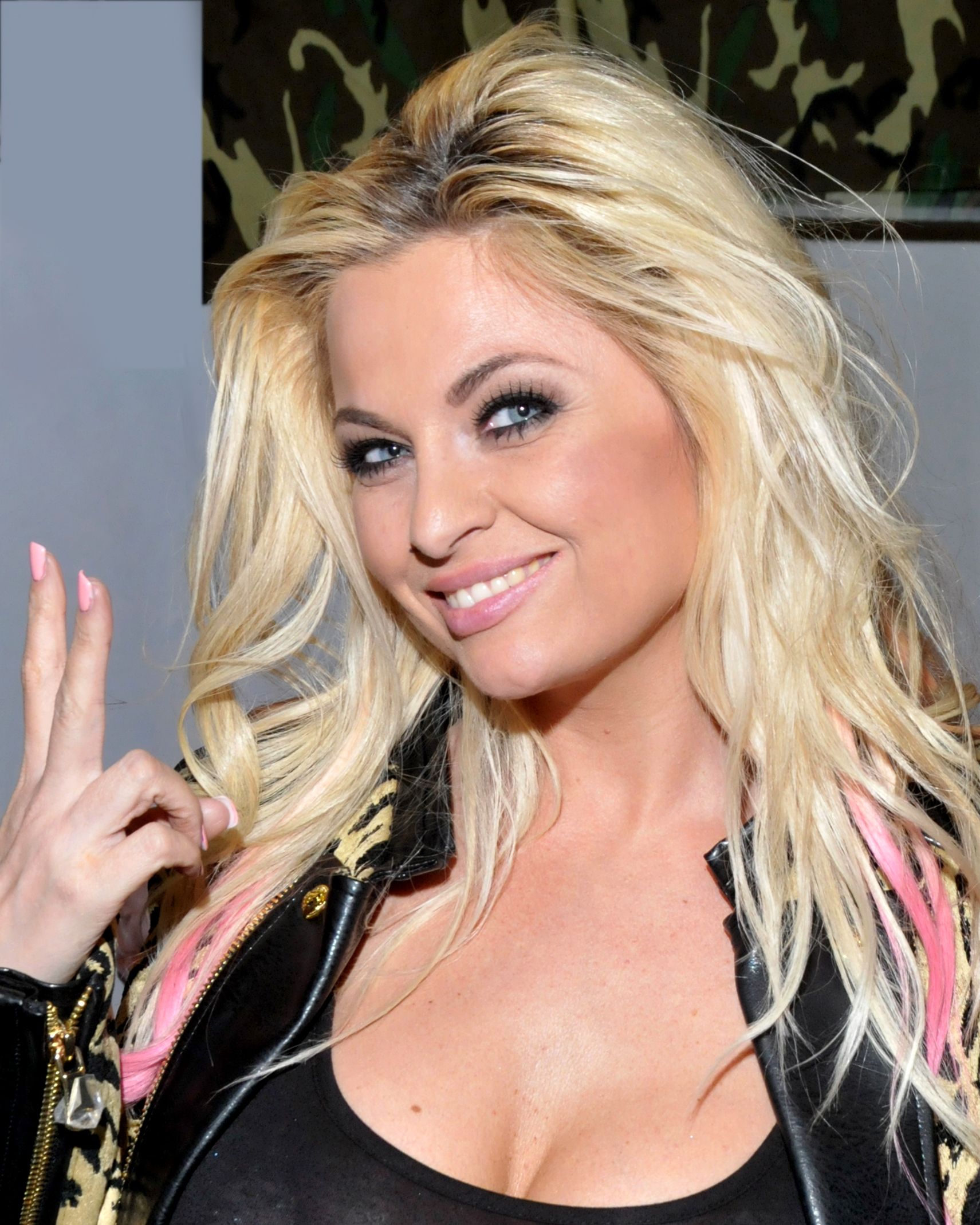
- Bobbi Eden in 2015
- Born: Priscilla Hendrikse; 3 January 1980 (age 46); The Hague, South Holland, Netherlands
- Other names: Bobby Eden, Bobbie Eden, Vixen De Ville
- Height: 5 ft 6 in (1.68 m)
- Website: bobbiedenlive.com

Bobbi Eden (born 3 January 1980) is a Dutch pornographic actress and international magazine model. She was the runner-up for the Dutch Penthouse Pet of the Year. She had also modeled for magazines including Club, Men Only, and Soho.

She appeared with Dutch DJ Ferry Corsten in the video for his single "Watch Out". In the video, a tiny Corsten races around in a model racing car while Bobbi looms overhead with the remote control. She has written columns for the magazines Passie and Chick, and currently writes for the magazine Panorama.

During the 2010 World Cup, Eden attracted media attention after her 28 June Twitter announcement, in which she promised to provide oral sex for all of her Twitter followers if the Netherlands team won the World Cup. The promise led to a large increase in the number of her followers. The Netherlands reached the final, subsequently losing 1–0.

In May 2012, Eden signed a deal to be the first Dutch adult star to have a Fleshlight. In September 2012, she premiered a Dutch Reality TV Show called 'Bobbi in the USA' on Dutch Cable Network Meiden Van Holland. Eden signed a cam deal with IsLive.com in September 2012.

She signed a contract to release an autobiography in 2014. In December 2016, she appeared on the Roast of Gordon Heuckeroth, the first Dutch edition of the Comedy Central Roast.

== Awards ==
- 2004 European X Award – Best Actress (Benelux)
- 2013 AVN Award Nomination - Best Solo Girl Website for BobbiEdenLive.com
