= Raymond Revuebar =

Theatre and strip club in Soho, London

Coordinates: 51.51245°N 0.1341°W

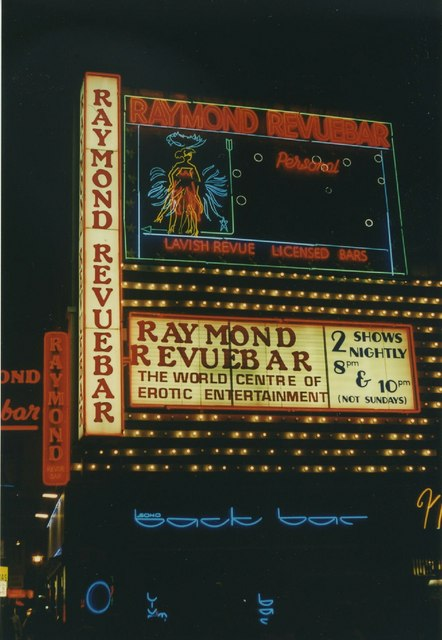
Raymond Revuebar in 1980

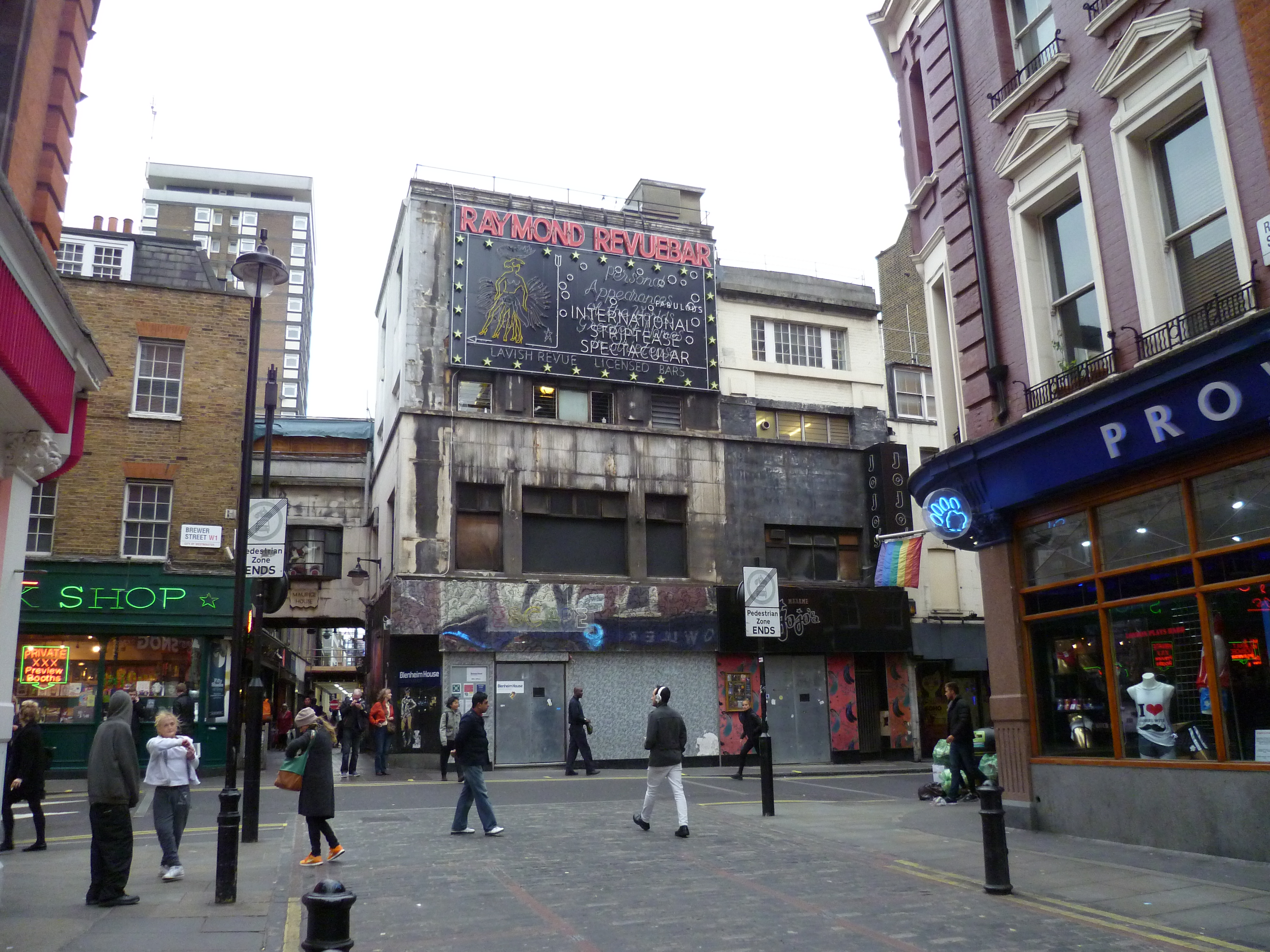
Facade of the Raymond Revuebar from Rupert Street, 2015.

The Raymond Revuebar (1958–2004) was a theatre and strip club at 11 Walker's Court (now the location of The Box Soho nightclub), in the centre of London's Soho district. For many years, it was the only venue in London that offered full-frontal, on-stage nudity of the sort commonly seen in other cities in Europe and North America. Its huge brightly lit sign declaring it to be the "World Centre of Erotic Entertainment" made the Revuebar a local landmark.

== History ==
The Raymond Revuebar was the creation of the businessman Paul Raymond. The theatre was formerly the Doric Ballroom. When it opened on 21 April 1958 it offered traditional burlesque-style entertainment, which included strip tease, and was popular with leading entertainment figures of the day. The venture took considerable investment from Raymond, who sold his house and his car to open the Revuebar, but it was highly profitable and he made over half a million pounds within the first ten years.

The Revuebar was one of the few legal venues in London to show full frontal nudity; by turning itself into a members-only club it was able to evade the strictures of the Lord Chamberlain's Office which then barred models from moving. Even though homosexual acts between men were illegal at that time, the Revuebar also incorporated a Sunday night show aimed at a gay audience. By 1967, the venue was purely hosting striptease. This would, in turn, make way for glitzy, big budget erotic shows of the type presented by Continental clubs such as the Crazy Horse. Performers were mostly female, with a small number of male dancers. Shows involved a mixture of solo striptease acts mixed with simulated boy/girl and girl/girl sex. These were packaged together as a show known as The Festival of Erotica which ran for many years, with as many as three performances nightly.

In 1980 Peter Richardson, with assistance from Michael White acquired the use of the Revuebar's second venue, the Boulevard Theatre as a new venue for Richardson's own comedy club. Richardson called it The Comic Strip, bringing with him a core group from The Comedy Store, including Peter Richardson, Nigel Planer, Rik Mayall, Adrian Edmondson, Dawn French, Jennifer Saunders and Alexei Sayle. It opened in October 1980 and ran until 1981. In 1989, the Boulevard Theatre was also home to Eddie Izzard's stand-up venue, Raging Bull.

During the 1990s, audiences dwindled. Competing table dancing clubs such as Spearmint Rhino and Stringfellow's began to attract customers, and as Soho was becoming more of a venue for gay nightlife the Revuebar was seeming outdated. The name and control of the theatre (but crucially, not the property itself) was bought by Gérard Simi in 1997 who reconfigured the show as a more conventional striptease revue. Gradually the theatre's fortunes waned, with Simi citing rising rent demands from Raymond as the cause.

In 2004 the Revuebar went into administration. It closed on 10 June 2004 and became a gay bar and cabaret venue called Too2Much, designed by Anarchitect. In November 2006, it changed its name to Soho Revue Bar, where it was the home of popular club nights including Trannyshack and hosted frequent special events including the West End Gala performance of the musical Elegies for Angels, Punks and Raging Queens on 1 December 2008. On 29 January 2009, the Soho Revue Bar closed.

The venue reopened in February 2011 as The Box Soho, billed as "A theatre of varieties", under the ownership of Simon Hammerstein.

== Media appearances ==
- Today Magazine. Vol. 2, No. 45, 31 December 1960. "Raymond King of Strip Clubs". An article by Ernest Dudley.
- Today Magazine January, 1961. "A Nice Quite Country Town, That's the Place for a Strip Show". An article by Ernest Dudley.
- British Pathe film "Clubs Galore", released 22-12-1958, film no. 1563.29. Paul Raymond talks about the Raymond Revuebar.
- London Weekend Television programme 1969, "For The Record". Paul Raymond is interviewed by Alan Watson.
- The Revuebar appeared briefly in the 1967 Beatles movie Magical Mystery Tour.
- Thames Television programme 1975. "Good Afternoon". Paul Raymond is interviewed by Elaine Grand.
- The Raymond Revuebar was used as a film location in the 1986 film "Mona Lisa".
- Extensive film of the 1970s/80s version of the Festival of Erotica show can be seen in the movie Paul Raymond's Erotica (1981) and the Electric Blue special VHS video, A Night at the Revuebar (1983).
- The Boulevard Theatre appears extensively in the 1981 Julien Temple film "The Comic Strip", a semi-fictional depiction of the alternative comedy revue of the same name that took place there.
- The theatre's 20th Anniversary was covered by the BBC TV news programme Nationwide in 1978.
- National Film School documentary film, "And They Called Me Pussy Dynamite", 1980. The film features the Raymond Revuebar dancer, Yvonne Ocampo. Directed by Jenny Wilkes and Jennie Howarth.
- A short dance routine was filmed for the Massive Attack: Eleven Promos DVD, "Be Thankful For What You've Got" in 1992. The film features a Raymond Revuebar dancer, Ritzy Sparkle.
- A 2008 Channel 4 television documentary,"Soho Sex King – The Paul Raymond Story". A shorter version of this film, produced before the death of Paul Raymond was screened in 2005 under the title of "Sex in the 70s – The King of Soho".
- The Soho Clarion, Issue no.132. Spring, 2008. The Soho Society. "My Own Private Revuebar" by Gerard Simi.
- The Soho Clarion, Issue no.136. Spring, 2009. The Soho Society. "When the Show Has to End" by Gerard Simi.
- Raymond promoted the Revuebar through regular photo articles in his publications Men Only and Club International which also featured full-page adverts for the show.
- Penthouse magazine Vol 2, No. 11, October, 1967. "Stripping the Light Fantastic". A review of the 1967 show.
- A Pictorial History of Striptease by Richard Wortley, Octopus Books Ltd., London, 1976. (And a later edition by the Treasury Press, London. ISBN 0 907407129)
- Members Only – The Life and Times of Paul Raymond by Paul Willetts. Serpent's Tail Ltd., London, August 2010. ISBN 9781846687150.

== See also ==
- List of strip clubs
