= Scarlett Carlos Clarke =

British photographer (born 1992)

- Born: 1992 (age 33–34); London, England
- Occupation: Photographer
- Years active: 2014–present
- Father: Bob Carlos Clarke
- Website: scarlettcarlosclarke.com

Scarlett Carlos Clarke (born 1992) is a British photographer and artist based in London.

== Early life ==
Carlos Clarke was born in London in 1992, the daughter of British-Irish photographer Bob Carlos Clarke.

== Career ==
Her debut solo exhibition The Smell of Calpol on a Warm Summer's Night, was at Cob Gallery in July 2021. Combining photography, sculpture and video, the exhibition was said by Hannah Abel-Hirsch in The British Journal of Photography to "engender a visceral feeling tied to the experience of domesticity. That simultaneous sense of comfort and claustrophobia, which can intensify after becoming a parent." Molly Cranston wrote in The Editorial Magazine that "The images themselves are lush and painterly, Clarke handles dramatic chiaroscuro like a renaissance painter, imbuing her photos with a sense of history and cinema, but the buzz-blue tones and household props (Daz detergent, Irn-Bru, Pampers) plant her subjects resolutely in contemporary Britain." Nick Waplington has compared them to the works of painters Edward Hopper and Grant Wood.

She is the youngest photographer to have a photograph acquired by the National Portrait Gallery, London.

== Publications ==
- The Smell of Calpol on a Warm Summer's Night. London: Mörel, 2024. ISBN 978-1-917282-01-7. With an essay by Nathalie Olah. Edition of 300 copies.
- Podunk - Nadia Lee Cohen by Scarlett Carlos Clarke. Tokyo: IDEA Ltd. 2026. Comb Bound. Edition of 500 copies.

== Group exhibitions ==
- 2015: Take! Eat!, Diane Chire and Mc Llamas, St Marylebone Parish Church, London
- 2016: New Femininity # 1, curated by GIRLS, Blender Studio, Berlin
- 2017: A Story the World Needs to See, Berlin Feminist Film Week, Berlin
- 2018: New Femininity # 2, Curated by GIRLS, Mutuo Galeria, Barcelona
- 2018: Pillow talk, Curated by Antonia Marsh, Palm Tree Gallery, London
- 2019: New Femininity # 3, Melkweg Expo, Amsterdam
- 2022: Unsafe At Any Speed, Morton St. Partners, curated by Kenny Schacter, New York
- 2025: Photos On Fridges, Harkawick, New York

== Collections ==
- National Portrait Gallery, London: 1 print (as of 14 February 2022)
