= Fiesta (1956–1959 magazine) =

British pin-up magazine published from 1956 to 1959

- Cover of Fiesta, June 1956
- Categories: Glamour photography
- First issue: 1956; 70 years ago
- Final issue: 1959
- Company: Gannet Press (Sales) Ltd

Fiesta was a British glamour photography magazine published from 1956 to 1959. It was the sister magazine to Carnival. It was published by Gannet Press (Sales) Ltd of Birkenhead, England.

While mostly black-and-white, the covers and some inside photography were printed in colour. The magazine featured work by the photographers Harrison Marks and Russell Gay.
