= Rupert Street =

Street in Soho, London

Coordinates: 51.5108°N 0.1326°W

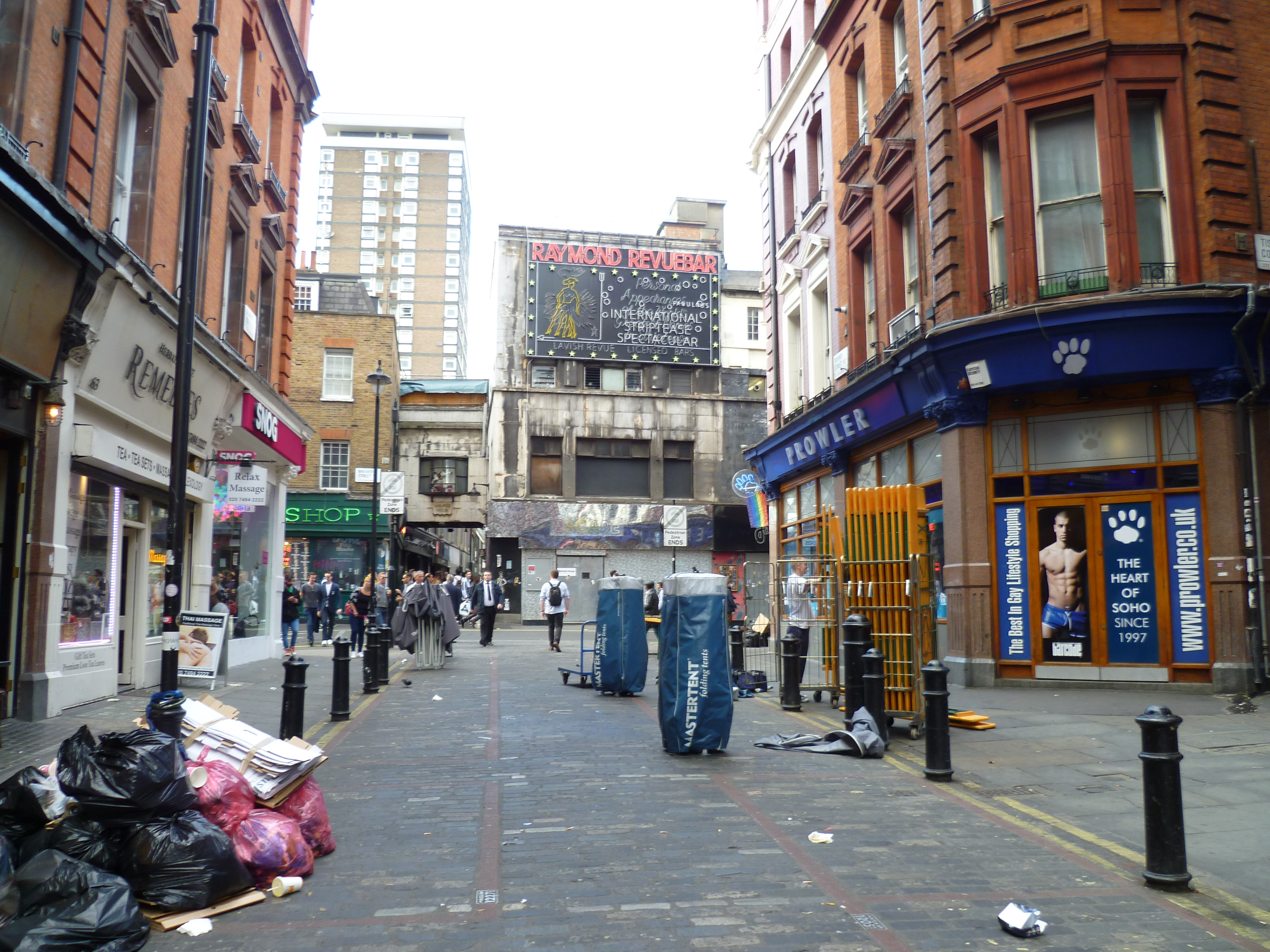
Rupert Street, with the entrance to Walker's Court visible to the North

Rupert Street is a street in London's Soho area, running parallel to Wardour Street and crossing Shaftesbury Avenue.

Rupert Street is first mentioned in records in 1677, and named for Prince Rupert of the Rhine.

The northern part of Rupert Street is part of Soho's gay village. A small alleyway, Rupert Court, links Rupert Street to Wardour Street in this area. At the northern end of Rupert Street, Rupert Street meets Brewer Street, and is continued by Walker's Court.

The southern part of Rupert Street is part of Soho's Chinatown area.
