= The Box Soho =

Cabaret nightclub in Soho, London

Coordinates: 51°30′45″N 0°8′3″W

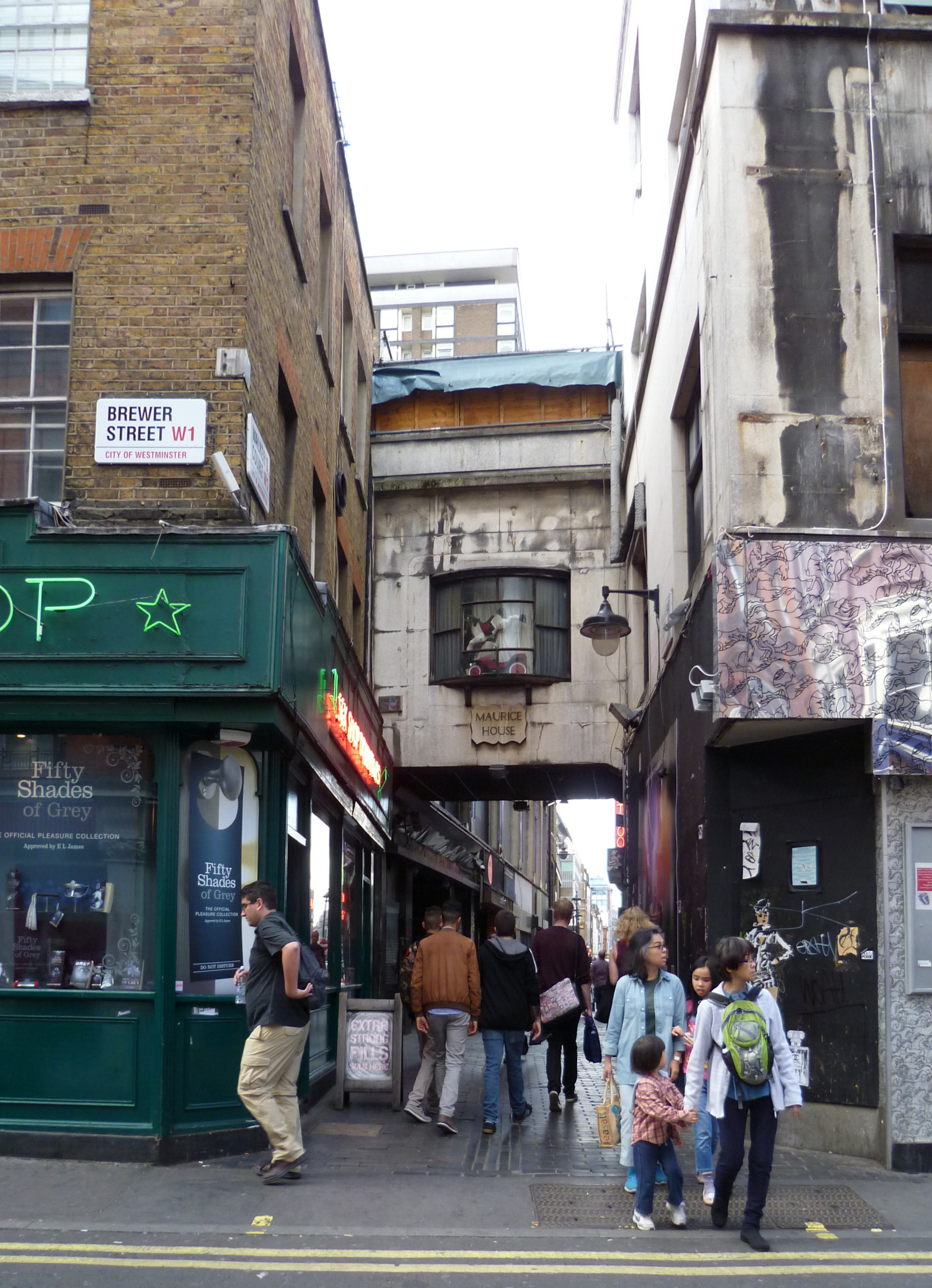
Walker's Court from the south.

The Box Soho is a cabaret nightclub located at 11-12 Walker's Court in Soho, London, on the premises formerly occupied by the Raymond Revuebar.

== Opening and ownership ==
Opened on 9 February 2011, it bills itself as a "theatre of varieties" and is a sister club to The Box Manhattan, New York City. The club is owned by Simon Hammerstein, the grandson of lyricist Oscar Hammerstein II.

== Performances ==
Performance artist Rose Wood is the headliner for both The Box Soho and Manhattan. Rose Wood (or "Miss Rosewood") is 'notorious' with Vice reporting that her "acts feature blood, manufactured excrement, toilets, and her body’s orifices; she’s emptied a condom on Leonardo DiCaprio and vomited on Susan Sarandon." The Guardian shared that an un-named club-goer described "acts involving acrobatics, threesomes, and men dressed as pigs licking food off strippers' stomachs" and reports that a "performer, known as 'Laqueefa', apparently playing well-known tunes with her genitalia."

== See also ==
- List of strip clubs
