= Keith Waite =

New Zealand-born editorial cartoonist

Keith Roy Waite (19 March 1927, in New Plymouth, New Zealand – 10 April 2014, in Ipswich, United Kingdom) was a New Zealand-born editorial cartoonist. He has been referred to as one of the 'greatest-ever social and political cartoonists' in Britain.

== Biography ==
At the age of nine, Waite won a newspaper cartoon competition. He has been quoted as saying "I just knew from an early age that I wanted to be a cartoonist". His interest in art continued and he attended Elam School of Fine Arts, as well as Auckland Teacher Training College. After teaching for a year, he returned to Elam while working as a free-lance cartoonist for the Taranaki Daily News, the Auckland Weekly News and the New Zealand Herald. He took up a position at the Otago Daily Times as a staff cartoonist in 1949.

In 1951, Waite moved to the United Kingdom contributing to a number of publications including the Sunday Times, the Glasgow Daily Record, The Scottish Daily News, Punch (1952–1964), and Men Only magazine. Between 1957 and 1964 he worked as the chief political cartoonist for the Daily Sketch in London, producing up to three cartoons a day. He continued to work for London-based publications, including the Sun (1964–69), the Daily Mirror (1969–85), the Sunday Mirror (1970–80) and the City Diary of The Times (1987–1997). He was made Cartoonist of the Year in 1963 by the Cartoonists' Club of Great Britain.

== Publications ==
- Just Waite: Cartoons from the Otago Daily Times (1950). Dunedin, Otago Daily Times Print.
- Waite up to date 1959: Cartoons from the Otago Daily Times (1951). Dunedin, Otago Daily Times Print.
- The adventures of Little Mookra, by John Emlyn Edwards, illustrated by Keith Waite (1977). London, Methuen Children's Books.
- Cooking afloat on sail and power boats, by Fiona Grafton, illustrated by Keith Waite (1979). London, Macmillan.
- The worlds of Waite: Cartoons from the Daily Mirror and Sunday Mirror (1989). London, Mirror.
- Sailing past, by Renee M Waite, illustrated by Keith Waite (1992). London, Seafarer

== Exhibitions ==
- Drawn and Quartered: The World of the British Newspaper Cartoon, 1720–1970, National Portrait Gallery, London (1970)
- Not By Appointment, London Press Club (1977)
- Public Lives - New Zealand's Premiers and Prime Ministers 1856–2003, National Library of New Zealand (2003)
