= Antonia Yeoman =

Australian-English cartoonist and illustrator

- Beryl Yeoman
- Born: Beryl Botterill Thompson; 24 July 1907; Esk
- Died: 30 June 1970 (aged 62); London
- Occupation: Cartoonist

Antonia Yeoman born Beryl Botterill Thompson sometimes known as Anton (24 July 1907 – 30 June 1970) was an Australian-English cartoonist and illustrator.

== Life ==
Yeoman was born in Esk in Queensland, Australia as Beryl Botterill Thompson. Her father was an English rancher and he oversaw a sheep farm. Her parents took her to visit England where her brother was born and her father died. Her mother Ida May (Cooke), who had been a Brisbane headteacher, decided to settle in the UK in Brighton. Yeoman suffered from tuberculosis of the spine throughout her childhood. She had to use her other hand after the disease took two of her fingers. Nevertheless, she trained at the Royal Academy and under artist and painter Stephen Spurrier.

Yeoman's first popular cartoons were as part of the partnership with her brother, Harold Underwood Thompson. Together they published under the name of "Anton" in the late 1930s. In time her brother found other interests directing an advertising company but Yeoman continued alone. Yeoman worked regularly for The Tatler, Men Only, The New Yorker, London's Evening Standard, Private Eye, Lilliput and Punch. She was the only woman in Punch's Toby Club.

In addition to illustrating 17 books, Yeoman also produced two collections of her own works: Anton's Amusement Arcade (1947) and High Life and Low Life (1952).

Yeoman died in Chelsea in 1970.
