= Pubic Wars =

1960s-70s rivalry between Playboy and Penthouse magazines

The Pubic Wars, a pun on the Punic Wars, was a rivalry between the American men's magazines Playboy and Penthouse during the 1960s and 1970s. Each magazine strove to show just a little bit more nudity on their models than the other, without getting too crude. The term was coined by Playboy owner Hugh Hefner. In the 1950s and 1960s, it was generally agreed in the United States that nude photographs were not pornographic unless they showed pubic hair or genitals. Mainstream mass-market photography was careful to come close to this line without stepping over it. Consequently, the depiction of pubic hair was de facto forbidden in U.S. pornographic magazines of the era.

== History ==
Penthouse originated in 1965 in Britain and was initially distributed in Europe. In September 1969, it was launched in the U.S., bringing new competition to Playboy, which had dominated the niche since its 1953 debut. Due to more liberal European attitudes to nudity, Penthouse was already displaying pubic hair at the time of its U.S. launch. According to Penthouse magazine's owner Bob Guccione, "We began to show pubic hair, which was a big breakthrough."

In order to retain its market share, Playboy followed suit, risking obscenity charges, and launching the "Pubic Wars". Playboy started showing wisps of pubic hair about nine months after Penthouse (June 1970). As competition between the two magazines escalated, their photo shoots became increasingly explicit. Playboy, however, had actually first showed a very slight glimpse of any pubic hair on Melodye Prentiss' centerfold (Miss July 1968), some 15 years after the magazine's introduction. With Playboy Playmates, it was usually the case that the pubic area would be obscured by an item of clothing, a leg, or a piece of furniture. The first appearance of real pubic hair in Playboy actually occurred in August 1969 in a pictorial featuring dancer/actress Paula Kelly. A few more glimpses of pubic hair appeared in some later pictorials and centerfolds, but it was not until January 1971 when Liv Lindeland showed clearly visible pubic hair in her pictorial. The first Playmate to clearly have the first full frontal nude centerfold was Miss January 1972, Marilyn Cole. Both went on to become Playmate of the Year, respectively 1972 and 1973. When Hustler was launched in 1974, it outdid both Playboy and Penthouse in explicitness by showing photos of women's genitalia.

Eventually, the two magazines moved their content in opposite directions. Playboy positioned itself as the less explicit softcore alternative to be "read for the articles". Penthouse gravitated towards raunchier images, ultimately arriving at hardcore pornography and photographs of women urinating, in the mid-1990s. Under new ownership since 2004, Penthouse began to steer toward a more softcore direction as well.

== See also ==
- Depictions of nudity § Magazine covers
- Pornography in Japan § History §§ In the 20th century – Until the late 1980s in Japan, publication of uncensored images showing pubic hair, in addition to depictions of full-frontal nudity, was de facto illegal
- Pubephilia
- Pubic hair § In art
