= Carnival (magazine) =

British pin-up magazine, first published 1955

- Cover of Carnival magazine, July 1955
- Categories: Glamour photography
- First issue: 1955; 70 years ago
- Final issue: 1959
- Company: Liverpolitan Limited

Carnival was a British glamour photography magazine first published in 1955. It was published by Liverpolitan Limited of Birkenhead, England. It was published in a 4 in × 6 in (100 mm × 150 mm) “pocket” format. The first issue contained pictorials of Adrienne Corri and Shirley Ann Field.

It was the sister magazine of Fiesta magazine (not to be confused with the later magazine of the same title), published from 1956 to 1959.
