= Soho Estates =

British property company

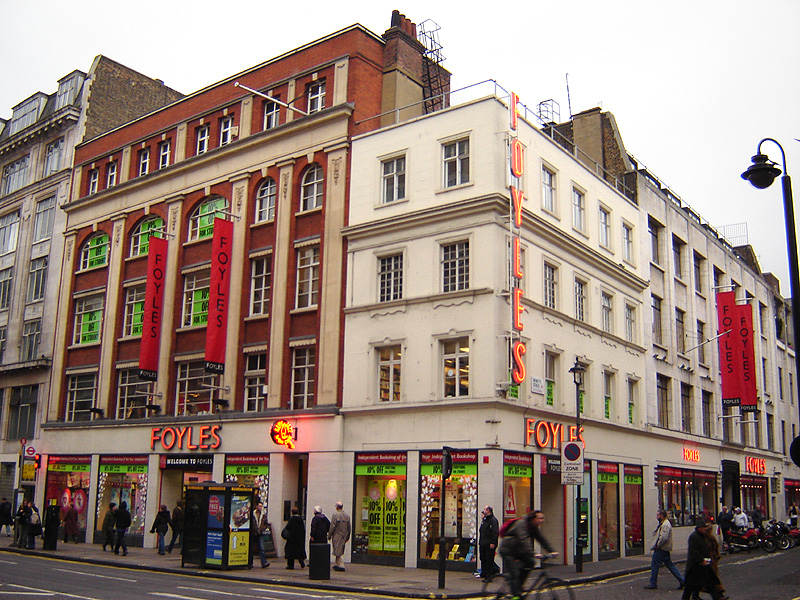
- The Foyles Building, 2006
- Trade name: Soho Estates
- Formerly: Whitehall Theatre Limited
- Company type: Private limited company
- Industry: Property
- Founded: October 5, 1949; 76 years ago in London, United Kingdom
- Founder: Paul Raymond
- Headquarters: 58 Wardour Street, London, United Kingdom
- Area served: Soho
- Key people: Chairman: Steven Norris; Managing Director: John James; Director: Fawn James
- Products: property development, property investment
- Revenue: ▲£34.1 million (2020)
- Operating income: ▼£10.2 million (2020)
- Net income: ▼£5.3 million (2020)
- Total assets: ▼£818.6 million (2020)
- Total equity: ▼£653.2 million (2020)
- Number of employees: 22 (2021)
- Parent: Soho Estates Holdings Limited
- Website: sohoestates.co.uk

Soho Estates is a British property company created by the entrepreneur and pornographer Paul Raymond. The holdings of Soho Estates are mainly based in Soho, a district in the West End of London. As of March 2025, the company's portfolio has an estimated value of £1.1 billion.

Through Soho Estates Holdings Limited and parent company FIJ Holdings Limited, it is controlled by Raymond's granddaughter Fawn Ilona James and her stepfather John James.

== History ==
Projects include the Autumn 2016 demolition of the Foyles Building at 111-119 Charing Cross Road, replaced by a new building, Ilona Rose House.

In March 2025, it was announced that Fawn James would take over the day-to-day management of the business from April onwards.
