= Paul Raymond (publisher) =

English publisher (1925–2008)

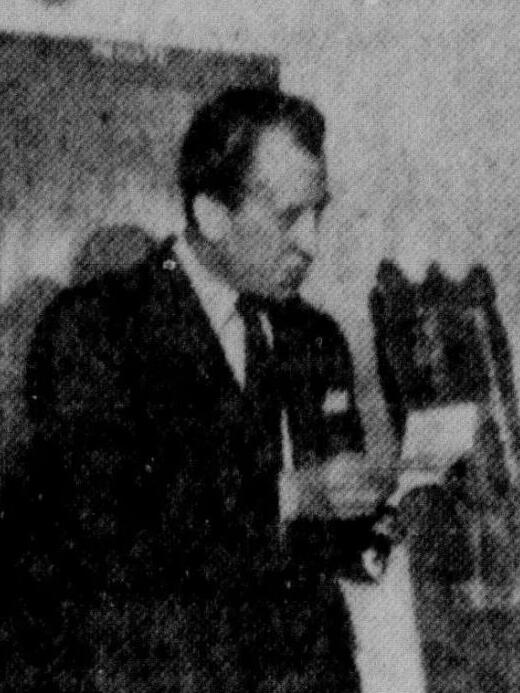
- Raymond in 1960
- Born: Geoffrey Anthony Quinn; 15 November 1925; Liverpool, England
- Died: 2 March 2008 (aged 82)
- Education: St Francis Xavier's College
- Occupations: Publisher; club owner; property developer
- Known for: Paul Raymond Publications; Soho Estates
- Spouse: Jean Bradley (1951–1974)
- Children: 3

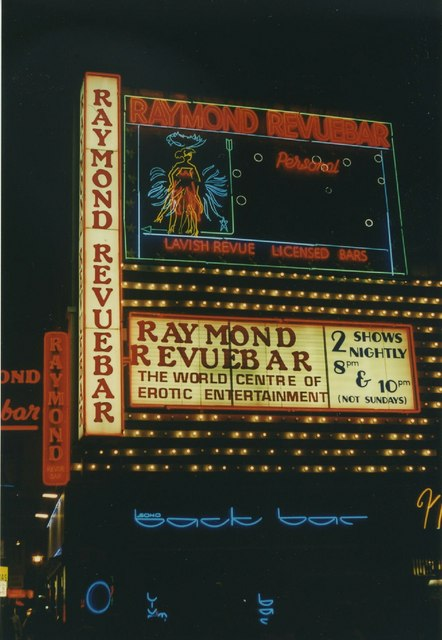
The Raymond Revuebar in Walker's Court. (1997)

Paul Raymond (15 November 1925 – 2 March 2008), born Geoffrey Anthony Quinn, was an English strip-club owner, publisher of pornography, and property developer who was dubbed the "King of Soho".

After opening the UK's first nightclub to stage live striptease, Raymond launched Paul Raymond Publications with the soft-porn magazine Men Only, soon followed by Escort, Club International, Mayfair and many other titles. He bought property on a large scale and by 1994 was the richest person in the UK.

He was starting to hand over control of his business to his daughter Debbie when she died of a heroin overdose in 1992, after which he became a recluse.

== Early life ==
Raymond was born in Liverpool to Frank Joseph (who later changed his surname to Quinn), and Maud McKeown, one of three sons of an Irish Roman Catholic family. The family was abandoned by the father (a lorry driver for a haulage contractor) when Raymond was five with the result that he was brought up by his mother, who refused to allow the News of the World in the family home. Raymond attended St Francis Xavier's College located in Liverpool. The outbreak of World War II prompted relocation to Glossop, Derbyshire, where he was educated by the Irish Christian Brothers.

Leaving school at 15, he was a Manchester Ship Canal office boy before taking up the drums with dance bands. He was conscripted as a Bevin Boy down a coal mine, but gave up after a day and was found by police; he then did his National Service in the Royal Air Force, while working as a switchboard operator and bandsman. A self-confessed spiv, he sold nylons and petrol coupons on the black market. His name change occurred when, at 22, he attempted a show business career as a mind-reader on Clacton pier.

== Career ==
The Lord Chamberlain's Office then controlled what was allowed on theatre stages and ruled that nudes could not move, thus when Raymond toured with a show featuring nudes they were presented as statues, which moved about the stage on podiums. Raymond's preference, in this context, was for women between 18 and 30 years old, 5 feet 8 inches tall and with a chest measurement of no more than 36 inches. The reason for the latter provision, Raymond explained, was that "I wouldn’t like to embarrass my customers".

He also circumvented the authority of the Lord Chamberlain's powers in 1958 when he opened the Raymond Revuebar strip club as a private club in the former Doric Ballroom in Soho's Walker's Court. He had been unimpressed with the first legal strip club in Soho, believing he could do better. Within two years, Raymond's Revuebar had 45,000 members. He also bought the freehold of his venue for £14,000 within a year or two, the beginnings of his property portfolio in Soho.

According to Raymond's biographer, Paul Willetts, Raymond's Revuebar initially attracted a "chic clientele", including the actor John Mills and comedian Peter Sellers. The seedy reputation of the club led to regular clashes with the authorities about show content. In 1961, his club was called "filthy, disgusting and beastly" by the chairman of the London Sessions (Note: A court of quarter sessions was a local criminal and civil court of limited jurisdiction. They were abolished in England and Wales in 1972.) when Raymond was fined £5,000 following a magistrate's decision that permitting members to ring the Ding Dong Girl's bells constituted running a disorderly house. There was also the issue about an onstage snake charmer who it was ruled should not have swallowed the snake in public.

Raymond first moved into publishing in 1964 when he launched the men's magazine King, but it ceased publication after two issues. In 1971, he took over and relaunched the adult title Men Only from City Magazines (it had been launched by C. Arthur Pearson Ltd in 1935); his other magazines eventually included Razzle and Mayfair. Among the models featured in his magazines was Fiona Richmond, who became Raymond's girlfriend. Jean Bradley was married to Raymond from 1951 to 1974, divorcing him over the relationship with Richmond and received a settlement of £250,000; she died in 2002. Richmond denied breaking the marriage in August 2008.

In 1974, he purchased the lease on the Windmill Cinema and returned it to the original name, the Windmill Theatre, though he relinquished it in 1986. Other theatres controlled by Raymond included the Whitehall Theatre (acquiring its lease in 1968) where the sex comedy Pyjama Tops ran for more than five years along with several sequels, and the Royalty Theatre. When strip tease began to decline, Raymond let his Boulevard Theatre within the Revuebar in 1980 to The Comic Strip team and others pioneering the new "alternative comedy" of the time.

Raymond diversified, investing millions into buildings and other property, especially in Soho starting in the 1970s, through his company, Soho Estates. During 1977, when many sex shops and strip clubs were closing because the police were active in closing them down, he was able to buy them cheaply. In that year, he was buying one Soho freehold each week, and also acquired property in Chelsea, Kensington and Hampstead. Raymond owned about 400 properties in the Soho area. He was a frequent name on lists of the UK's wealthy reportedly with an estimated £650 million. One associate claimed the estate was worth billions, though public records of assets overseas did not exist. Forbes also placed him on its list of US dollar billionaires.

Often dubbed by the press 'King of Soho', he was the target of two extortion attempts, which were disclosed in the October 2010 release of Metropolitan Police papers. The second attempt was from decorators who threatened Raymond with bombing and shooting while pretending to be members of the IRA.

On 22 January 1967, Raymond was initiated into the Grand Order of Water Rats for his contribution to entertainment in the UK.

== Personal life ==
Around 1990 Raymond began to hand over control of his empire to his daughter Debbie (Deborah Jane Raymond, born 28 January 1956), but she died from an accidental heroin overdose on 5 November 1992. Debbie was editor-in-chief of the company's titles, as well as involved in its property concerns. Raymond also had two sons, Howard by his wife Jean, and Derry from a previous relationship.

== Death ==
A recluse in his last years and living in a penthouse near the Ritz Hotel, he died of prostate cancer and respiratory failure in 2008, aged 82.

== Film biography ==
The Look of Love (released 26 April 2013) is a film about his life. Directed by Michael Winterbottom, it featured Steve Coogan as Raymond, Anna Friel as his wife Jean, Imogen Poots as his daughter Debbie and then-current Paul Raymond Publications employees and editors (extras or pseudo-cameos). The working title was The King of Soho, but this was changed as Howard Raymond had already trademarked it for another (as yet unmade) drama about his father's life; he stated that he had "never wanted or sought" to prevent Winterbottom's film being made.
