= Viv Thomas =

British pornographic film director

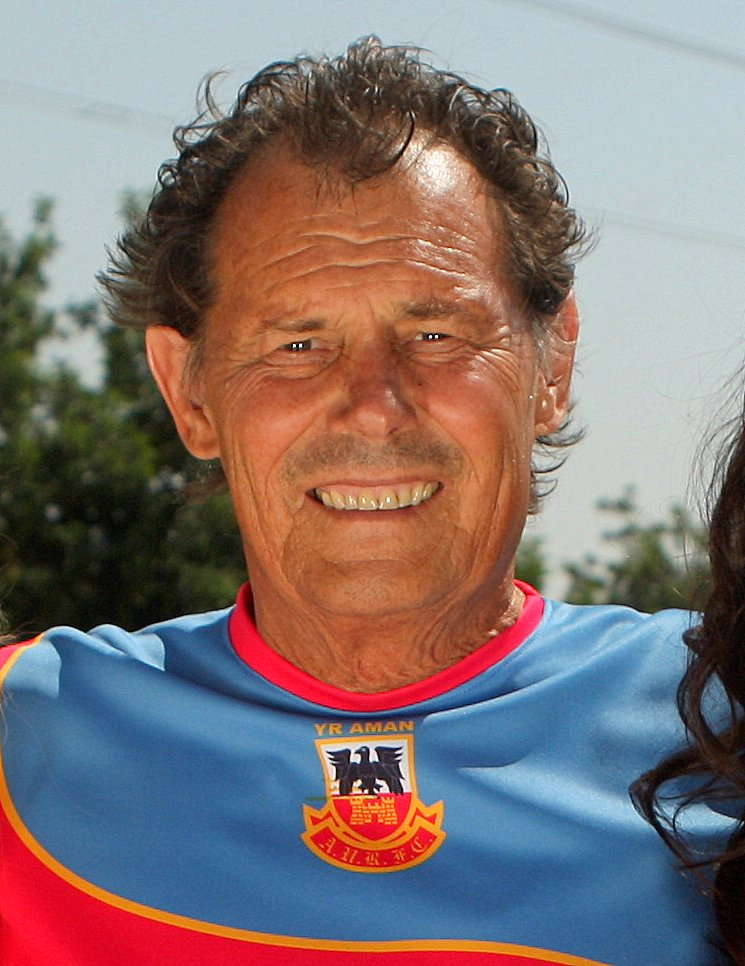
- Occupation: Pornographic film director
- Years active: 1984—present
- Website: Viv Thomas' Official Site

Viv Thomas is a British producer of pornographic movies. He has produced hundreds of features over the course of his 15+ year career. He specializes in producing lesbian pornography, as well as foot fetish videos. His popular titles include the Pink Velvet trilogy, the Unfaithful series, and The Art of Kissing series. The Story of She 2 starring British model Lexi Lowe was his best-selling movie of 2013.

== Career ==
In addition to lesbian pornography, Thomas has also produced an equal number of heterosexual works. The majority of his work was produced prior to the British government lifting some of the more stringent laws regarding what could be shown in pornographic films; when those laws were repealed in 1999, Thomas moved into producing hardcore material exclusively. However, after a court decision confirmed that R18 rated hardcore DVDs can only be sold via licensed sex shops in the UK, not mail order via the internet, Thomas decided to move his whole operation from Acton, West London to Portugal. He also maintains a studio in Budapest.

Thomas is known for producing artistic pornographic films with an emphasis on high production values and has been nominated for numerous awards and has won at the AVN Awards in the past. His contemporaries include the established pornographic director/producers Andrew Blake, Michael Ninn, and Marc Dorcel.

Thomas' more recent work has starred almost exclusively Hungarian, Czech, and other Central European models, although he does feature some British performers, such as Ian Tate, as well as Americans such as Penny Flame.

Other British models he has worked with include Lexi Lowe (Lowe worked exclusively with Thomas for the first year of her lesbian film career), Alicia Rhodes, Michelle Thorne, Kelle Marie, and Roxanne Hall. Central European models who are frequently featured in his videos include Eve Angel.

His productions are distributed by Girlfriends Films (USA and the world) and Erigo Distribution (UK and Europe). In early 2013 Viv Thomas Productions entered into an agreement with MetArt for the management of his flagship web site, vivthomas.com. The new site was launched on 26 March 2013.

Between 2006 and 2011, Thomas presented his models with awards for working with the company "as a way of saying thank you". The company hosted a fan based voting competition to find the Viv Thomas Babe of the Year in 2011.

In 2008 Thomas instituted the Viv Thomas Golf Masters, a golf tournament that takes place every year around Spain and Portugal.

== Awards ==
- Babe Of The Year
  - 2011: Babe of the Year: Sandra Shine
  - 2011: Best Newcomer: Lexi Lowe
- Best Movie
  - 2009: Office Girls 2
  - 2010: Unfaithful 5
