= Paul Raymond Publications =

British pornography publisher

- Parent company: Blue Active Media Ltd.
- Status: Active
- Founded: 1964
- Founder: Paul Raymond
- Successor: Paul Chaplin
- Country of origin: United Kingdom
- Distribution: (as high as) 500,000
- Publication types: Escort; Club International; Mayfair; Men Only; Men's World; Razzle; Swing Mag; Club DVD; Escort DVD
- Nonfiction topics: Adult content
- Revenue: £20 million
- Official website: www.paulraymond.xxx

Paul Raymond Publications is a British publisher of softcore monthly pornographic magazine titles, including Escort, Club International, Mayfair, Men Only, Men's World and Razzle. The company's lawyers scrutinise the magazine content before publication to ensure that it is likely to comply with the Obscene Publications Act 1959 since UK law does not allow hardcore R18 imagery to be sold on newsstands. The magazines are generally available in most newsagents, although some larger retailers require them to be sold in bags to protect minors from seeing the cover photographs. The magazines have also been published in digital format since 2013. They were initially available from the dedicated Paul Raymond digital newsstand, but since that closed they have been sold via the publisher's main website which contains both softcore and hardcore pornography. Blue Active Media Ltd. is the parent company.

== History ==
Paul Raymond (1925–2008) began his publication ventures, which were financed by Raymond Revuebar profits, with the short-lived King magazine in 1964 but the company was established with the purchase of Men Only in 1971 and Club International in 1972. Raymond relaunched Men Only with photographs of the women who worked at his strip-clubs. Within a few years he made the claim of a 500,000 circulation. In 1979 he launched the Electric Blue series of videos, a range which was produced until the mid 1990s. Raymond's daughter Debbie ran the company for a time, until her death in 1992 from an overdose. The company's main competitors in the UK are Gold Star Publications, formerly owned by David Sullivan, and Northern & Shell, owned by Richard Desmond. In 1999 the company had revenues of £20 million, and pre-tax profits of £19 million. As of 2001 it produced eight of the 10 best-selling pornographic magazines in the UK, aided by its deal with Comag, one of Britains largest magazine distributors. In the 2000s the company's fortunes waned due to competition from the internet and "lad mags". Profits declined from an annual profit of over £10 million in 2005 to a loss in 2008, a situation that the company blamed on Internet competition and the cost of including free DVDs with its magazines.

== Sale and acquisition ==
Following Raymond's death, the US arm of the company was sold to Magna Publishing Group; the UK arm was sold to private investors that formed Tri Active Media Ltd. holding it for about 3 years. On 6 October 2012 Paul Chaplin bought Paul Raymond Publications for an undisclosed sum and united it with Loaded and Superbike magazines under the newly formed Blue Active Media Ltd. This provided the capital to rejuvenate the Paul Raymond magazines with the aim of returning them to their heyday. Mayfair magazine improved in paper quality and pagination.

Chaplin aimed to use digital media to add value to the print publications. He developed the Paul Raymond brand online, setting up new websites using the top-level domain name .xxx that had been introduced in 2011.

== Magazine Titles ==
- Mayfair
- Escort
- Club International
- Men Only
- Men's World
- Razzle
- Club DVD
- Escort DVD
- Escort Readers Wives
- Escort xxx Rated
- Escort Swingmag
- Razzle Readers Wives
- Razzle Extreme
- Best of Men Only
- Best of Mayfair
- Best of Club International
- Mayfair Lingerie
- Club International "Teen's Untamed"
- Model Directory

== See also ==
- Pornography in the United Kingdom
