= Digital newsstand =

Electronic distribution platform for periodicals

A digital newsstand is a digital distribution platform for downloadable newspapers, magazines and journals. Examples include (but are not limited to) Apple's Newsstand and Google Play Newsstand – both of which have been discontinued – Amazon Kindle Newsstand and Magzter. It is an online development of the traditional brick-and-mortar type of newsstand.

== Content ==
Digital newsstands allow users to download content to phones, tablets or other devices. The magazine pages are presented as PDFs that can be scrolled through. Once a magazine is purchased and added to their personal user page, the user can look through the entire magazine.

Users can choose from featured magazines on the main page of the digital newsstand app or search for specific magazines according to categories. Magazines issues that are often used are usually saved to the favorites menu. Users can use a mouse to turn the pages of a digital magazine or click on the navigation buttons under magazine. Many digital newsstands also allow tools that allow users to zoom into the digital magazine to get a better view of the text.

Some digital newsstands allow users to self-publish magazines. The electronic publishing platform Issuu allows users to upload content for others to download and read, with some functionality available on a subscription basis.

Digital newsstands appeal to a global market, creating an interactive reading experience. As many publications began to produce content exclusively for online markets, newsstand relevancy increased and they were placed prominently in major operating systems and web-based systems. This is also in part due to the much lower costs of publishing in the absence of traditional production costs such as printing and distribution.

Evolving from the concept of a traditional newsstand, they often compete with their brick and mortar counterparts. Some magazines, such as Top Gear, are printed as both a paper copy and a digital magazine to attract different audiences.

== Platforms ==
Technology-based lifestyle companies like Apple, Amazon, and Google have each hosted their own newsstand or system equivalent.

=== Newsstand ===
Created exclusively for Apple operating systems, Newsstand allowed users to curate and organize digital media through a central mobile application. In-application purchases were completed through Apple's iTunes store, and recurring purchases could be automatically delivered when available. It was discontinued in 2015 and replaced with Apple News, a news aggregator app.

=== Google Newsstand ===
Google Play Newsstand (originally Google Play Magazines) was a standalone mobile app for Android and iOS which gave access to pdf magazines, while a dedicated Newsstand section of the Google Play website provided the same function. Offline download and reading was supported on the mobile app. In 2018 the app was discontinued and access to pdf magazines was moved into Google News, Google's news aggregator service. Google's provision of pdf magazines ended completely in 2020.

=== Amazon Kindle Newsstand ===
In similar fashion, the Kindle Newsstand was created exclusively for Amazon Kindle Tablet users. Before purchasing, users are offered a 14-day trial, and upon any completed purchases, users can download content to the Cloud after subscriptions are canceled. An iOS and Android app subsequently allowed the users of other tablets and smartphones to access newspapers and magazines via the Amazon Kindle service. Amazon stopped accepting new digital magazines in 2020 and announced the end of the Newsstand service in 2023.

=== Magzter ===
Magzter is the world's largest and fastest growing self-service, cross-platform digital newsstand with over 80 million users since its inception in 2011 and thousands of magazines and newspapers across 40+ categories and 60+ languages. Founded by global entrepreneurs, Girish Ramdas and Vijay Radhakrishnan in June 2011, Magzter enables magazine and newspaper publishers around the world to create and deliver digital editions of their titles to global consumers. The Magzter platform is available as an app on Apple iOS, Android (Google Play) and Amazon Appstore, and a website for browser-based reading. Magzter offers the world's largest “All-You-Can-Read” subscription service called Magzter GOLD which gives digital readers unlimited access to 7,500+ magazines and newspapers for a monthly subscription price.

== EU Copyright Directive 2019 ==
While some digital magazines can be read for free on certain websites, there has been speculation that the Directive on Copyright in the Digital Single Market passed in 2019 in the EU may make it harder for some people to view free content online. Draft Article 11 allows publishers of newspaper and magazine articles to receive an income from companies such as Google which provide links to their content. Draft Article 13 requires websites that host user-generated content, such as YouTube and Facebook, to work with rights holders to prevent users uploading copyrighted content without consent. While this should mainly affect those living in the EU, it may limit the content seen on the Internet in other countries.

== See also ==
- Apple Books Store
- Barnes & Noble Nook
- Readly
