= Club International =

British men's magazine

- Cover of Club International Vol. 46 No. 6 (May 2017). The cover model is Roxi.
- Editor: Andrew Emery
- Categories: Pornographic men's
- Frequency: 4-weekly
- Publisher: Paul Raymond Publications
- Founded: 1972
- Company: Blue Active Media Ltd
- Country: United Kingdom
- Language: English
- Website: www.paulraymond.xxx/magazines/club-international.html

Club International is a monthly British adult magazine published by Paul Raymond Publications that features softcore pictures of nude women. It is a sister magazine of the American magazine Club.

== History and profile ==
Club International was founded in 1972 and is published every four weeks, making thirteen issues per year. Each edition consists of one hundred printed pages and is staple-bound, with the exception of the slightly larger "special edition", published at the start of each new volume, which has some 120 pages and flat glued binding.

Club International is published by Paul Raymond Publications, which publishes eight of the UK's ten top adult magazines. Along with Mayfair magazine, Club International is considered one of Raymond's most upmarket top shelf productions, with the photo spreads generally featuring more glamorous photosets shot by experienced photographers.

== Content ==
Each edition of Club International features ten photosets, with the exception of the slightly larger "special edition" which features between twelve and thirteen sets. The photosets are usually single-model shoots but there are also lesbian scenes. The shoots are generally softcore, and as such do not feature any sort of penetration or oral-genital contact. However some photoshoots feature the occasional "pink" shot, where a model exposes her vaginal lips. During the early to mid-1980s, a regular feature was "Club Event", a picture sequence involving a group of models (usually about half a dozen) performing a form of striptease around a central theme such as a Christmas party, or whilst wearing (and removing) various types of uniforms.

=== Models ===
The magazine once offered the British TV newsreader Anna Ford a fee of £75,000 to appear naked in its pages, but she declined. It has, however, featured a number of well-known models and pornstars, such as Lexi Lowe, Tanya Tate, Monica Sweet, Zsanett Égerházi, Sandra Shine, Peaches, Silvia Saint, Stephanie Swift, and popular Hungarian model Sophie Moone (often credited as 'Stella'). Also among the women featured is the "Reader's Girlfriend", presented as an amateur model who is the girlfriend of a Club International reader.

=== Features ===
Long-running features in Club International include its regular readers' letters page, "Talkin' Blue", where 'readers' share tales of their sexual experiences, and "Peaches", a feature that covers anal sex (although the writing is far more explicit than the images that accompany the feature). As with a number of similar men's magazines, there are the regular automotive features, editorials, video and book reviews, as well as a jokes page. Starting in 2008, a free DVD has been included with every issue.

=== Online edition ===
Club International is also sold in digital format. Initially this was via the Paul Raymond digital newsstand from 2013 until that website closed. Subsequently it has been available digitally from the publisher's main website.

== See also ==
- Outline of British pornography
- Pornography in the United Kingdom
