= Nigel Richardson =

British human rights lawyer

Deputy District Judge
- Incumbent
- Assumed office March 2009

Personal details
- Born: Nigel John Richardson; February 1958 (age 68)
- Education: University of Oxford MA, London Guildhall University
- Known for: Representing victims of human rights abuses
- Website: www.hja.net

Nigel John Richardson (born February 1958) is a British human rights lawyer who serves as a deputy district judge. He was appointed to that office in May 2009. As a lawyer, Richardson is known for representing victims of human rights abuses in high-profile criminal cases with international element.

== Legal career ==
Richardson was educated at University of Oxford and London Guildhall University. He was admitted as a solicitor in 1972. He became a trainee solicitor at Hodge Jones & Allen which specialises in human rights in 1985 and a senior partner in the firm in 1994. In 2009 Richardson was appointed Deputy District Judge sitting in the Magistrates court.

== Human rights ==
=== Gay rights ===
In 2012 Richardson acted for Michael Peacock in a landmark obscenity trial which changed the law on obscene publications in this county and was seen as a test of the Obscene Publications Act 1959. Peacock, a male escort, was charged with six counts of distributing obscene DVDs under the Obscene Publications Act 1959. He was found not guilty by a jury at Southwark Crown Court.

=== Pornography ===
In 2012, Richardson, together with his colleague Myles Jackman, successfully defended Simon Walsh, barrister and Court of Aldermen member who was accused of possession of extreme pornography under Section 63 of the Criminal Justice and Immigration Act 2008. The case came as a test to the Act.

=== Racism ===
In 2016 Richardson represented Coronation Street actor Marc Anwar who became the centre of a racism row after posting a controversial comment about Indians on Twitter, which resulted in his sacking from the ITV soap.

=== Joe Orton's retrial ===
As a judge, Richardson presided over Joe Orton's retrial in 2012. Orton was an English writer who in 1962 was sentenced to six months imprisonment for historic sexual offences and fined for stealing and damaging Islington Public Library books. Prosecution insisted on retrial fifty years after he served his conviction. The case made national headlines with newspapers arguing as to whether it was right to put Orton on trial. Orton later suggested that the lengthy sentence was given because he was a "queer."

== Academic career and publications ==
Richardson was a visiting criminal law lecturer of Oxford Institute of Legal Practice from 2001, until its closure in 2013. In 2014, together with Peter Clark, barrister at 187 Fleet Street Chambers who specialises in sex cases, he co-authored a book called Sexual Offences – A Practitioner’s Guide. Richardson also co-authored Blackstones Guide to the Human Rights Act 2000.

== Charity ==
Richardson is a trustee of English Collective of Prostitutes, a charity which aims to transform the lives of sex workers by campaigning against decriminalisation of prostitution and provides information, help, and support to individual sex workers and others who are concerned with sex workers' human, civil, legal, and economic rights.

== See also ==
- R v Peacock
- Decriminalisation of Sex Work
- Sexual Offences Act 2003

Legal offices
Unknown	Deputy District Judge; 2009–present	Incumbent
