= Hodge Jones & Allen =

British law firm

Hodge Jones & Allen LLP
- Headquarters: London, NW1; United Kingdom
- Offices: London, United Kingdom
- No. of attorneys: Over 200
- Major practice areas: Criminal Defence; Civil liberties; Human Rights; Housing
- Key people: Nigel Richardson
- Date founded: 1977
- Founders: Henry Hodge; Peter Jones; Patrick Allen
- Company type: Limited liability partnership
- Website: Official website

Hodge Jones & Allen LLP is a London solicitors founded in September 1977 by Henry Hodge, Peter Jones, and Patrick Allen, specialising in legal aid work and favouring radical causes.

== History ==
In 1976, Patrick Allen, an articled clerk at Mayfair solicitors, Offenbach & Co, was discussing the possibility of setting up a new law firm with colleague and solicitor Peter Jones. They looked for a third partner and were introduced to Henry Hodge then head of the Citizens Rights office at CPAG.

Hodge found a willing bank manager, Bert Enright of the Midland Bank, Camden Town who agreed to lend each partner £3500 on overdraft subject to parental guarantees. They found premises above a tailor's shop on Camden High Street. In August 1977 Allen completed his Part 2 Law Society exams at Alexandra Palace and joined Hodge at the new office which they painted . In September 1977 Jones arrived and they opened for business. Bert sent the first client who needed advice on a bank guarantee. Their first £5 fixed fee was framed and put on the wall of Henry's office– later stolen by a client.

The firm was founded specifically to use the law and a flourishing legal aid scheme to provide the means for vulnerable clients to assert or defend their rights.

The firm first had offices on Camden High Street, chosen because they were in an area of social deprivation and not far from the law courts. Initially, the firm specialised in criminal defence, family law, housing, private client work and general litigation which was mostly funded by legal aid. It went on to develop teams in personal injury, clinical negligence and multi-party work.

The firm expanded steadily each year and in November 1997 moved off the High Street to Twyman House, Camden Road, with 75 employees. The offices were opened by Cherie Booth, who accepted briefs from the firm in her early career. The first website was launched shortly after the move. The firm now employs over 230 people at its offices on North Gower Street, Camden and has 47 partners.

In December 2018, for a brief period Hodge Jones & Allen Solicitors became first law firm to convert its business model to create a 100% employee owned trust (EOT). Unfortunately, this was not a working model which suited the business and the firm reverted back to a full LLP model in 2025. Hodge Jones & Allen Solicitors Limited trade and run in the same way as Hodge Jones & Allen Solicitors LLP, but 100 per cent of the shares of the new limited company will be owned by the Trust rather than the current members of the LLP.

== Notable cases ==
=== Sexual offences ===
- HJA's partner Nigel Richardson acted for Michael Peacock in a landmark obscenity trial that set a test of the Obscene Publications Act 1959.

=== Disasters ===
- Victims of the Marchioness ferry disaster
- Victims of the King's Cross fire

=== Crime ===
- Represented Extinction Rebellion activists.
- Represented the Stansted 15 protesters in their fight to have terror convictions overturned for stopping a Home Office deportation flight.
- Represented over 100 activists who were core participants in the UK undercover policing scandal.
- Represented the Colston Four, accused of criminal damage for toppling a statue of Edward Colston in Bristol during anti-racism protests in 2020.
- Representing older person Just Stop Oil activist Gaie Delap, imprisoned for public nuisance

=== Health ===
I feel sad because it’s been a long struggle. And I feel sad that some can’t trust the answer that we’ve come up with. But it hasn’t been a close decision insofar as it’s been finely balanced. The fact is that we haven’t got the causation or the negligence.

— —Patrick Allen on the collapse of the firm's Gulf War Syndrome litigation in 2004
- Healthcare workers, children and people in ‘at risk groups’ who alleged they had narcolepsy due to the 2009-10 pandemic H1N1 swine flu vaccine ‘Pandemrix’
- Families of girls alleged to have been harmed by Cervarix, the cervical cancer vaccine.
- Gulf War veterans who claimed that they suffered from Gulf War Syndrome. The case collapsed in 2004.

=== Military ===
- The family of Scottish soldier Private Jason Smith, who died of heatstroke in Iraq in August 2003.
- The family of Private Phillip Hewett, who died in Iraq in July 2005 when the Snatch Land Rover he was travelling in was hit by a roadside bomb.

=== Property dispute ===
- Legal challenge against HS2 Ltd on behalf of Hero Granger-Taylor, a Camden resident.

=== Personal injury ===
- Represented the Al-Najjr family who suffered life-changing injuries in a hammer attack at the Cumberland Hotel.

=== Civil liberties and human rights ===
- Miners during the 1980's strike
- Winston Silcott, who was accused and acquitted of the murder of Keith Blakelock during the 1985 Broadwater Farm riot.
- Ella Adoo-Kissi-Debrah inquest – Ella, a 9-year-old girl who lived close to the heavily polluted South Circular Road in Lewisham, became the first person to have air pollution on her death certificate.
- Vincent and Michael Hickey, two of the Bridgewater Four.
- Members of UK Uncut who were arrested in Fortnum & Mason during a 2011 protest.
- Neville Lawrence, the father Stephen Lawrence, who was murdered in a racist attack.
- A woman arrested and denied bail for allegedly handling stolen goods after the 2011 England riots.
- A policy to not represent defendants in rape cases where the defence put forward was that the woman consented was criticised and quickly dropped.

=== Family law ===
- Philippa Vaughan, who successfully claimed a divorce settlement twenty-five years after her divorce.

=== Housing law ===
- Representing residents of Grenfell Tower.
- Jayesh Kunwardia, head of the Housing team was successful in a Supreme Court challenge against the decision of Westminster City Council to accommodate a homeless family far from their home borough.
