= Murder of Jane Longhurst =

2003 homicide case in England

Jane Longhurst (6 November 1971 – 14 March 2003) was a British special-needs teacher and musician who was murdered by Graham Coutts on 14 March 2003. Longhurst's partly decomposed body was found burning in woodland in West Sussex on 19 April. Coutts, who was dating Longhurst's best friend, was a guitarist and part-time salesperson living in Brighton.

Coutts admitted to causing Longhurst's death. He claimed that Longhurst had died accidentally during consensual erotic asphyxiation, although the prosecution maintained that there was no evidence suggesting the two had been lovers. Coutts was convicted of murder on 3 February 2004, and sentenced to a life term serving a minimum of 30 years (reduced to 26 years on appeal on 26 January 2005). The conviction was quashed by the Court of Appeal on 19 July 2006, and a new trial started on 12 June 2007. He was again found guilty on 4 July 2007.

== Murder trial ==
During the original murder trial in 2004 and the retrial in 2007, Coutts said that he had a fetish for necks and strangulation. His testimony, confirmed by witnesses, stated he had engaged in breath control play with several consenting partners on many occasions without incident over several years.

The Court heard that Coutts had sexually arousing murderous thoughts about women since he was 15, and after speaking with his GP about his fixations, was referred for psychiatric help. Consultant psychiatrist Larry Culliford testified that he had seen Coutts in 1991, 12 years before the murder, and that Coutts told him that he feared his thoughts might lead to criminal action. Coutts had a self-confessed addiction to internet pornography and accessed violent pornography that simulated strangulation, rape and necrophilia. He had downloaded images of dead and strangled women the day before Longhurst's death. The prosecution said that Coutts' use of violent pornography to satisfy his "sexual fantasies" had led to his dangerous sexual behaviour and murderous intent.

Coutts testified that he wrapped a pair of tights around Longhurst's neck as part of consensual sex and that her death was an accident; he said it was the first occurrence of a sexual act between them. The prosecution claimed that he had invited her to his flat under false pretences, then attacked and killed her to "satisfy his very long-standing and perverted sexual interest in violence to women and in particular the killing of women by strangulation".

Evidence was given by a defence witness that several years earlier, Longhurst had whispered to a colleague that a sexual encounter the previous night had "involved some kind of stopping breathing". The defence claimed that this was evidence that the deceased had engaged in activity with another partner, similar to that claimed by Coutts. Longhurst's boyfriend and a previous lover stated that they had not indulged in erotic asphyxia with her. Prosecution witnesses testified that Longhurst was in a stable relationship with her long-term boyfriend and that they were happy together.

Coutts initially kept the body in his flat in Hove, but then moved it in to a storage unit at Big Yellow Self Storage in Brighton. He visited the storage unit 11 times while the body was there. After he removed the body from the unit, Big Yellow staff noticed the smell and alerted police. The Court heard that Coutts hid Longhurst's body for a month and that it was found in secluded woodland after he set it on fire.

=== Pathologists' expert testimony ===
Home Office pathologist Vesna Djurovic testified that Coutts must have been aware of the medical emergency for two to three minutes before death became inevitable. Had Coutts acted on this emergency as soon as he became aware of it, Longhurst would definitely have survived. By continuing to constrict her neck with a ligature long after becoming aware of the emergency, Coutts showed the necessary mens rea for murder. Djurovic said that Longhurst's death could have been from heart attack or vagal inhibition, but in her experience, these were unlikely mechanisms. Djurovic's evidence was contested by defence pathologist, Richard Shepherd, whose expert opinion was that death could have occurred very quickly by vagal inhibition, taking as little as one or two seconds.

== Murder conviction and appeals ==
On 4 February 2004, after his first trial, Coutts was convicted of Longhurst's murder and began serving a 30-year minimum prison term. He pursued an appeal on multiple grounds, including the issue of manslaughter charges and his minimum prison term, which was brought to the Court of Appeal in December 2004. In January 2005, the Court of Appeal rejected Coutts' appeal against his murder conviction, but upheld that the jury should have been given a possible manslaughter verdict, and reduced his minimum prison term to 26 years. Coutts' case was then taken to the House of Lords and on 19 July 2006, the Law Lords overturned the murder conviction, ruling that the jury should have been presented with a possible manslaughter verdict. This verdict would have been appropriate had the jury decided that the death was an accident caused by Coutts' negligence. On 19 October 2006, his conviction was formally quashed by the Court of Appeal and a re-trial ordered; this began on 11 June 2007 at the Old Bailey. Coutts was convicted on 4 July 2007 by an eleven to one (11:1) majority verdict. The following day, 5 July, Coutts was sentenced once again to a life term (serving a minimum of 26 years).

== Criminalisation of possession of "extreme pornography" ==
The possible link with what the Government termed "extreme pornography" led to calls from Longhurst's mother Liz, the police, MP Martin Salter and Home Secretary David Blunkett to ban such websites. A campaign by the government and Liz Longhurst collected a petition of over 50,000 signatures calling for a ban on "extreme internet sites promoting violence against women in the name of sexual gratification" after the original murder conviction of Coutts. Unable to shut down the websites, many of which were legally hosted in the UK and US, the Home Office was motivated to consult on criminalising possession of "extreme pornographic material", including images of consenting adults, and staged "realistic depictions" of such acts. Although the consultation found 63% of responses opposed strengthening the law to address the "challenges of the Internet", the UK government announced on 30 August 2006 that it intended to introduce new laws governing the possession of "extreme pornography". The possession of such material would be punishable by up to three years' imprisonment. The Consenting Adult Action Network protested against the resultant law, and SM group Unfettered created a campaign, Backlash, in opposition to such changes.

Proponents of the new laws called them a way of protecting women from similar tragedies. Critics said that the reverse may be true, citing evidence from Japan, the United States, Denmark and elsewhere that sexually motivated crime negatively correlates with the availability of pornography, or that such laws could criminalize those who are not violent.

On 26 January 2009, Section 63 of the Criminal Justice and Immigration Act 2008 came into force in England, Wales and Northern Ireland, introducing a new offence of possession of "extreme pornographic images".
