= Obscene Publications Act 1857 =

Act of the Parliament of the United Kingdom

Obscene Publications Act 1857 (Note: The citation of this act by this short title was authorised by section 1 of, and the first schedule to, the Short Titles Act 1896. Due to the repeal of those provisions it is now authorised by section 19(2) of the Interpretation Act 1978.)
- Act of Parliament
- Parliament of the United Kingdom
- Long title: An Act for more effectually preventing the Sale of Obscene Books, Pictures, Prints, and other Articles.
- Citation: 20 & 21 Vict. c. 83
- Territorial extent: England and Wales; Ireland; (Note: Section 5.)

Dates
- Royal assent: 25 August 1857
- Commencement: 25 August 1857 (Note: The Acts of Parliament (Commencement) Act 1793.)
- Repealed: England and Wales: 29 August 1959
Other legislation
Amended by	Statute Law Revision (Northern Ireland) Act 1980
Repealed by	England and Wales: Obscene Publications Act 1959

Status: Partially repealed

Text of statute as originally enacted

The Obscene Publications Act 1857 (20 & 21 Vict. c. 83), also known as Lord Campbell's Act or Campbell's Act, is an act of the Parliament of the United Kingdom dealing with obscenity. For the first time, it made the sale of obscene material a statutory offence, giving the courts power to seize and destroy offending material. The act superseded a 1787 Royal Proclamation by George III titled Proclamation for the Discouragement of Vice. The proclamation commanded the prosecution of those guilty of "excessive drinking, blasphemy, profane swearing and cursing, lewdness, profanation of the Lord's Day, and other dissolute, immoral, or disorderly practices". Prior to the act, the "exposure for sale" of "obscene books and prints" had been made illegal by the Vagrancy Act 1824 (5 Geo. 4. c. 83). but the publication of obscene material was a common law misdemeanour. The effective prosecution of authors and publishers was difficult even in cases where the material was clearly intended as pornography.

== Origins ==
The spur for the act arose from a trial for the sale of pornography presided over by the Lord Chief Justice, Lord Campbell, at the same time as a debate in the House of Lords over a bill aiming to restrict the sale of poisons. Campbell was taken by the analogy between the two situations, famously referring to the London pornography trade as "a sale of poison more deadly than prussic acid, strychnine or arsenic", and proposed a bill to restrict the sale of pornography, arguing that giving statutory powers of destruction would allow for a much more effective degree of prosecution. Lord Campbell, the Chief Justice of Queen's Bench, introduced the bill.

The bill was controversial at the time, receiving strong opposition from both Houses of Parliament, and was passed on the assurance by the Lord Chief Justice that it was "...intended to apply exclusively to works written for the single purpose of corrupting the morals of youth and of a nature calculated to shock the common feelings of decency in any well-regulated mind."

The House of Commons amended the bill to exclude Scotland, on the grounds that Scottish common law was sufficiently stringent.

== Provisions ==
The act provided for the seizure and summary disposition of any material deemed to be obscene, and held for sale or distribution, following information being laid before a "court of summary jurisdiction" (a magistrates' court). The act required that following evidence of a common-law offence being committed – for example, on the report of a plain-clothes policeman who had successfully purchased the material – the court could issue a warrant for the premises to be searched and the material seized. The proprietor then would be called upon to attend court and give reason why the material should not be destroyed. The act also granted authority to issue search warrants for premises suspected of housing such materials.

== Application ==
The act did not define "obscene", leaving it to the courts to devise a test, based on the common law.

Regina v. Hicklin was heard in 1868 and involved one Henry Scott, who resold copies of an anti-Catholic pamphlet entitled "The Confessional Unmasked: shewing the depravity of the Romish priesthood, the iniquity of the Confessional, and the questions put to females in confession." When the pamphlets were ordered destroyed as obscene, Scott appealed the order to the court of Quarter Sessions. Benjamin Hicklin, a London magistrate who was in charge of such orders as Recorder, revoked the order of destruction. Hicklin held that Scott's purpose had not been to corrupt public morals but to expose problems within the Catholic Church; hence, Scott's intention was innocent. The authorities appealed Hicklin's reversal, bringing the case to the consideration of the Court of Queen's Bench.

Chief Justice Cockburn, Campbell's successor as Lord Chief Justice, reinstated the order of the lower court, holding that Scott's intention was immaterial if the publication was obscene in fact. Justice Cockburn reasoned that the Obscene Publications Act allowed banning of a publication if it had a "tendency ... to deprave and corrupt those whose minds are open to such immoral influences, and into whose hands a publication of this sort may fall." This test became known as the Hicklin test and allowed portions of a suspect work to be judged independently of context. If any portion of a work was deemed obscene, the entire work could be outlawed.

This interpretation was clearly a major change from Campbell's opinion only ten years before – the test now being the effect on someone open to corruption who obtained a copy, not whether the material was intended to corrupt or offend.

Cockburn's declaration remained in force for several decades, and most of the high-profile seizures under the act relied on this interpretation.

== Current status ==
The whole act was repealed for England and Wales by section 3(8) of the, Obscene Publications Act 1959 (7 & 8 Eliz. 2. c. 66), which came into force on 29 August 1959. The 1959 act reformed the law related to obscenity, with several extensions to police powers included. The 1959 did, however, repeal the 1857 act and became the main act dealing with obscene publications.

The Obscene Publications Act 1964 made several minor additional provisions to the 1959 act. As of 2008 these latter two Obscene Publications Acts are still in force, albeit as amended by more recent legislation.

== Bibliography ==
- Craig, A. (1937). The Banned Books of England. London.
