= Obscene Publications Acts =

United Kingdom legislation

Since 1857, a series of obscenity laws known as the Obscene Publications Acts have governed what can be published in England and Wales. The classic definition of criminal obscenity is if it "tends to deprave and corrupt," stated in 1868 by Lord Justice Cockburn, in Regina v. Hicklin, now known as the Hicklin test.

== Timeline of legislation ==
There have been several acts of Parliament of this name:

- Obscene Publications Act 1857 (20 & 21 Vict. c. 83)
- Obscene Publications Act 1959 (7 & 8 Eliz. 2. c. 66)
- Obscene Publications Act 1964 (c. 74)

Of these, only the 1959 and 1964 acts are still in force in England and Wales, as amended by more recent legislation. They define the legal bounds of obscenity in England and Wales, and are used to enforce the removal of obscene material. Irish law diverged from English law in 1929, replacing the OPA 1857 with a new Irish act.

== Key cases under the Obscene Publications Act ==
Scottish prohibitions on obscene material are to be found in section 51 of the Civic Government (Scotland) Act 1982.

== See also ==
- Censorship in the United Kingdom
- Pornography in the United Kingdom
- Section 63 of the Criminal Justice and Immigration Act 2008 – defines 'extreme pornography' and details offences
