= Gaie Delap =

British climate activist (born 1947)

- Born: 10 January 1947 (age 79)
- Occupation: Retired teacher
- Known for: Climate activism
- Criminal charges: Public nuisance
- Criminal penalty: 20 months imprisonment reduced to 18 months on earlier appeal
- Criminal status: Sentence completed but subject to current appeal

Gaie Delap (born 10 January 1947) is a retired teacher and climate activist from the United Kingdom. Delap took part in a motorway blockade organised by Just Stop Oil on 9 November 2022 and was sentenced to 20 months in prison for the crime of public nuisance.

Delap's case came to public attention when service provider Serco/EMS failed to fit an electronic monitoring tag after she was released on home detention curfew and she was duly recalled to HM Prison Eastwood Park to complete her sentence in custody. Serco/EMS subsequently fitted the same tag that had previously been deemed unsuitable and Delap was released on home detention for a second time on 31 January 2025. Delap's original sentence was also extended a further 20 days — the timespan used by Serco to unsuccessfully search for an alternative home monitoring solution the first time around.

Delap challenged her conviction and sentence and the Court of Appeal subsequently reduced her prison term by two months. In early‑June 2025, Delap sought leave to appeal these same matters to the UK Supreme Court.

In early‑June 2025, Delap and broadcaster Chris Packham began legal proceedings against director of public prosecutions and the justice secretary Shabana Mahmood under the European Convention on Human Rights (ECHR).

== Protest activity ==
=== M25 motorway blockade ===
Delap joined the blockade of the London M25 motorway by five Just Stop Oil activists on 9 November 2022. At age 75, she was arrested for climbing an overhead gantry and preventing traffic flow for about an hour. Delap sat on the gantry alongside Paul Bell, a PhD student studying climate science at Exeter University.

The action was one of a series of M25 blockages organised by Just Stop Oil starting on 7 November 2022 and spanning four days. Police report 58 individuals in total were charged. These events are sometimes referred to as the "M25 Gantries" actions.

==== Charge and original sentence ====
Delap was convicted for the crime of public nuisance and sentenced to 20 month in prison. The severity of the sentence for a non‑violent protest in the public interest has attracted considerable criticism.

==== Home detention failures ====
Delap was offered home detention under the United Kingdom home detention curfew scheme and was released on licence from HM Prison Peterborough on 18 November 2024. She returned to her home in Bristol in South West England. Delap later recounted her experiences at Peterborough prison in her first press interview after completing her sentence.

Serco/Electronic Monitoring Service (EMS) was, however, unable to fit a suitable monitoring tag to the wrist of Delap, then aged 77, and, because she could not be tagged on her ankle for medical reasons, she was recalled to prison to complete her sentence. Delap was arrested and taken to HM Prison Eastwood Park on 20 December 2024. The operational policy surrounding the use of electronic monitoring specifically for Delap was the subject of a formal question and answer in the UK Parliament during January 2025.

Later in January 2025, Delap was told that she would have to serve a further 20 days in prison, the amount of time Serco/EMS had previously spent unsuccessfully trying to find a suitable wristband — this because she was officially classified as "unlawfully at large" during this period, despite remaining in her apartment in Bristol and in otherwise full compliance with the terms of her curfew. One commentator argued that this constitutes legal double jeopardy — in this case a citizen being punished twice for what was clearly a systemic failure.

Delap was released to home detention for a second time on 31 January 2025 after the previously rejected 15 cm monitoring tag was apparently deemed workable.

==== Court of Appeal review ====
Delap appealed her case to the full bench of the Court of Appeal on 29–30 January 2025. In an unusual move, this judicial process collectively considered four Just Stop Oil actions across 16 defendants in the one sitting. The Court of Appeal returned its verdict on 7 March 2025. Delap's sentence was reduced by two months to 18 months because the trial judge had not taken into account the onerous bail conditions Delap had faced while awaiting trial. Civil society organizations criticized the reduced sentence as still disproportionate.

On 11 June 2025, Gaie Delap, along with Roger Hallam and nine other climate activists, lodged a Permission to Appeal application with the Supreme Court of the United Kingdom in respect of this Court of Appeal decision.

==== Legal and political remedies ====
See below for the wider challenge to UK protest laws under European human rights protections.

On 27 January 2025, the National Women's Justice Coalition (NWJC) published an open letter signed by 22 legal rights and women's support organisations and 2 legal researchers. The letter states we "consider that the recall process has resulted in acute and protracted psychological distress, which amounts to an unlawful violation of Article 3 of the European Convention on Human Rights (the prohibition on inhuman and degrading treatment), as well as violating Article 14 (the prohibition on discrimination)". The signatories also call on the UK government to "launch an inquiry into the systemic failures that have led to this situation, ensuring better coordination between EMS, the probation service, and the prison system to prevent similar injustices in the future".

On 31 January 2025, Jolyon Maugham of the Good Law Project indicated that the organisation is considering supporting litigation against the Ministry of Justice and Serco under the Equality Act 2010. Delap said that she was being "discriminated against as a woman" and the Good Law Project has begun to document examples of similar fact breaches. Crowdfunding for the case commenced in late‑2024.

Law firm Hodge Jones & Allen, acting for Delap, has taken the first formal step in legal proceedings against justice secretary Shabana Mahmood. A copy of the precursor letter to judicial review, dated 24 January 2025, has been made public and includes timeframes.

Carla Denyer MP for Bristol Central has campaigned on Delap's behalf in relation to both her sentence and the failure to provide suitable home detention monitoring.

Quaker‑led vigils have been held outside the prison where Delap was being housed.

== Legal challenge to UK protest laws ==
=== European human rights violations ===
In early‑June 2025, Delap and well‑known wildlife broadcaster Chris Packham announced a joint legal challenge to current protest laws in the United Kingdom — and specifically provisions within the Police, Crime, Sentencing and Courts Act 2022 (PCSCA). The PCSCA provides for peaceful protesters of any persuasion to be prosecuted and convicted for the new, widely-framed criminal offence of "public nuisance". The pair, represented by the law firm Leigh Day, have sent a Pre‑Action Protocol letter to the UK Director of Public Prosecutions and the Secretary of State for Justice — being the first step in legal proceedings. Their letter demands urgent clarification and reform of how the PCSCA is being interpreted and enforced by the courts and argues that the current law, which criminalises "public nuisance", is so broad and imprecise that it risks criminalising entirely peaceful environmental protests. The current legislation, therefore, fails to offer sufficient protection for the rights to freedom of speech and assembly under Articles 10 and 11 of the European Convention on Human Rights (ECHR), a treaty ratified by the United Kingdom in 1951.

== References in UK Parliament ==
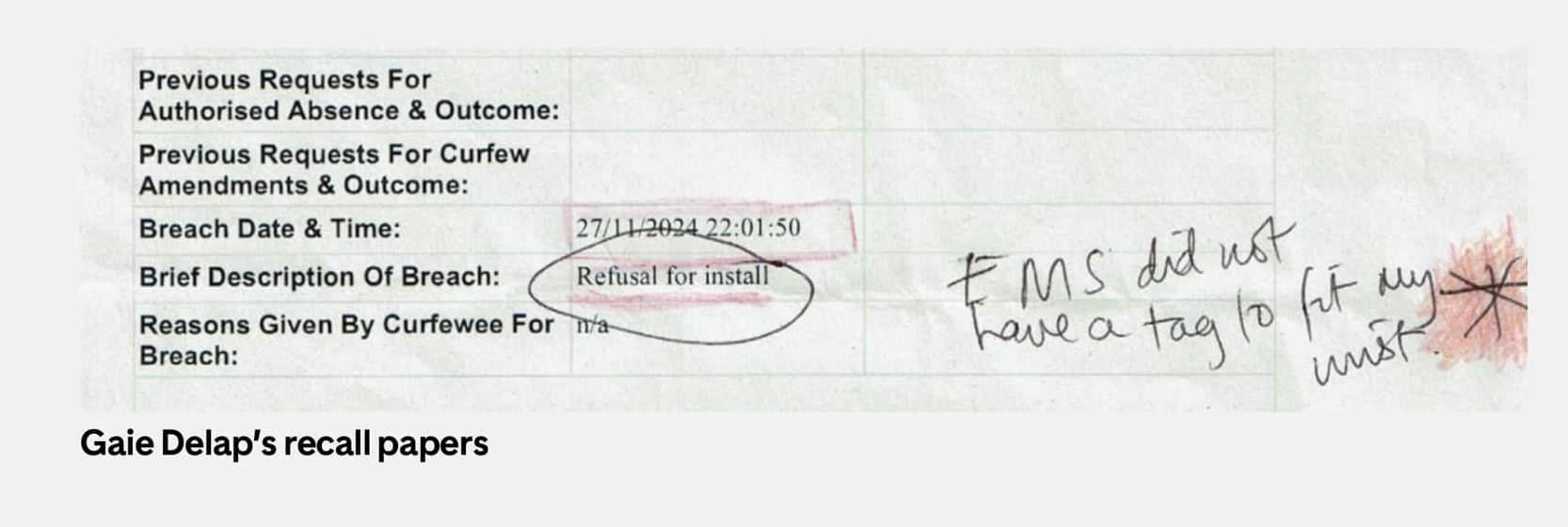
Recall to prison paperwork. The handwriting is Delap's own.

Gaie Delap was mentioned in a UK Parliamentary debate by Kim Johnson MP concerning the Sentencing Bill. Johnson stated "I remind Members of the appalling case of Gaie Delap, a Just Stop Oil activist in her late 70s, who spent extra weeks in prison because Serco could not find a tag to fit her. The companies making millions from these contracts should be sanctioned, so that they deliver services correctly."

The House of Lords Justice and Home Affairs Committee cited Gaie Delap's case in a policy letter sent to the Minister of Prisons on 5 November 2025.

== Personal life ==
Delap is a retired teacher and lives in Montpelier, Bristol, United Kingdom. Delap is a practicing Quaker.

== See also ==
- Environmental movement
- Just Stop Oil M25 blockade case
- Serco prisons and justice operations
