= International Union of Sex Workers =

United Kingdom-based trade union for sex workers

- International Union of Sex Workers
- Abbreviation: IUSW
- Founded: 2000; 26 years ago
- Location: United Kingdom
- Key people: Ana Lopes
- Affiliations: GMB
- Website: www.iusw.org

The International Union of Sex Workers (IUSW) is a United Kingdom-based trade union for sex workers. It campaigns for the decriminalisation of prostitution, and to have sex work acknowledged as viable labour. In 2002, members voted to affiliate with the GMB, a general workers union. The union now has official recognition as the sex industry branch of the GMB. Some of the services offered by the union include: self-defence classes, free legal advice and training for members who wish to leave the sex industry.

The union was formed in 2000 partly as a response to actions taken by Westminster City Council in London to try to remove prostitutes from the area.

They are a member of Backlash, a pressure group formed in 2005 in order to oppose a new law criminalising possession of "extreme pornography".

== See also ==
- Labour rights
- Pornography in the United Kingdom
- Prostitution in the United Kingdom
- Sex workers' rights
- Sex Workers Union
