= Myles Jackman =

English lawyer (born 1974/75)

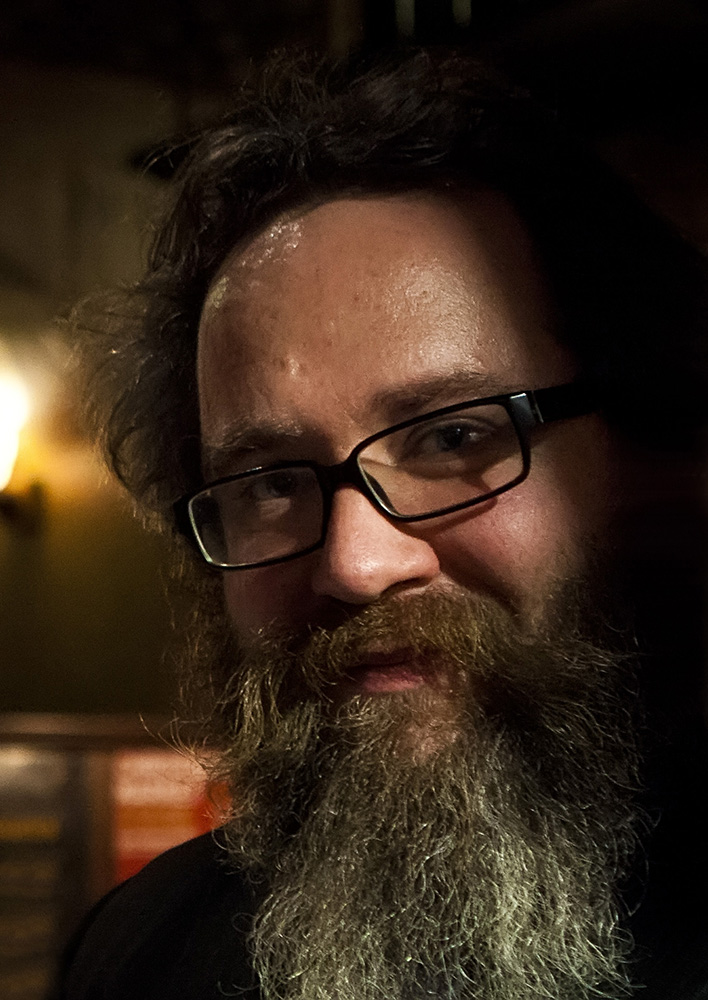
- Jackman in 2012
- Born: 1974 or 1975 (age 50–51); Basildon Hospital, Essex, England
- Occupation: Lawyer
- Website: mylesjackman.com

Myles Jackman is an English lawyer who specialises in defending cases related to pornography.

Jackman was born at Basildon Hospital, where his father, a consultant radiologist and his mother, Susan, a radiology technician, worked and met. He was a boarder at The King's School, Canterbury. His father died when Jackman was 18. He read law at the University of the West of England in Bristol, and was diagnosed as dyslexic when aged 37.

He was the defence solicitor in the landmark R v Peacock case, in 2012, which was seen as a test of the Obscene Publications Act 1959. He also successfully defended Simon Walsh, in another 2012 case, seen as a test of Section 63 of the Criminal Justice and Immigration Act 2008. During the latter trial he was the first acting solicitor allowed to live tweet from a British trial. The same year, he was awarded the Junior Lawyer of the Year Excellence Award by the Law Society of England and Wales.

In March 2016, he was appointed Legal Director of the Open Rights Group.

He also writes as a journalist on matters related to pornography and the law, and provides pro bono advice to the pressure group Backlash.
