= Wakefield Girls' High School =

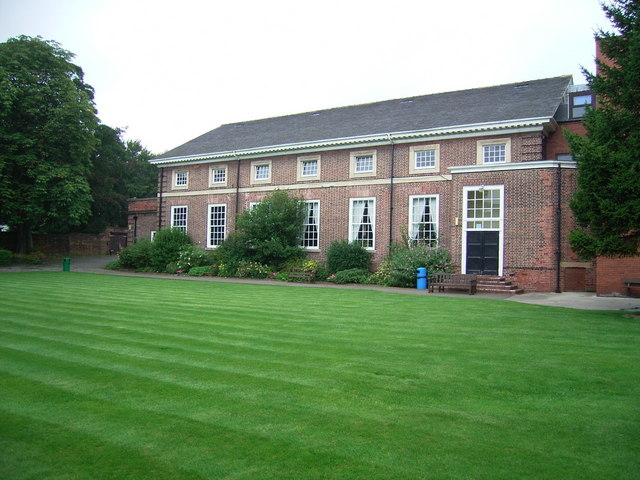
- Wakefield Girls' High School

Location
- Wentworth Street; Wakefield, West Yorkshire, WF1 2QS; England
- Coordinates: 53.6869°N 1.5036°W

Information
- Type: Private school
- Motto: Each For All and All For God
- Established: 1878
- Local authority: City of Wakefield
- Department for Education URN: 108305 Tables
- Head teacher: Mrs Judith Tingle
- Gender: Girls
- Age: 8 to 18
- Enrolment: 665 as of January 2016
- Website: http://www.wgsf.org.uk

Wakefield Girls' High School (WGHS) is a private school in Wakefield, England, established in 1878 in Wentworth House. The initial enrolment of 59 pupils has since increased to 665.

== Community ==
The school is part of the Wakefield Grammar School Foundation, comprising Wakefield Girls' High School Queen Elizabeth Grammar School and Wakefield Grammar Pre-Preparatory School.

== Education ==
In 2021, 29% of students earnt A* grades at A Level. 63% of students achieved straight A* and A grades awarded in three or more subjects and 85% of students achieved grades A* to B.

Also in 2021, over 75% of all GCSE entries were awarded 9 – 7 grades with one-third being awarded grade 9.

== Notable alumnae ==
- Dame Barbara Hepworth, artist
- Dame Anne Mueller, British civil servant and academic. Second Permanent Secretary at the Cabinet Office from 1984 to 1987 and then at HM Treasury from 1987 to 1990. She was Chancellor of De Montfort University from 1991 until 1995.
- Monica Edwards, children's author
- Helen Fielding, author of Bridget Jones's Diary
- Joanne Harris, author of Chocolat
- Katherine Kelly, actress
- Baroness Prashar, member of the House of Lords
- Honey Watson, writer and Mandarin–English translator
- Dame Elsie Marjorie Williamson DBE, British academic, educator, physicist and Principal of Royal Holloway College, University of London
- Nichi Hodgson, British journalist, broadcaster, and author.
- Heidi Allen, British former politician, served as Member of Parliament South Cambridgeshire 2015 – 2019, February 2019 resigned, leader of Change UK, University of London

== Coat of arms ==
Coat of arms of Wakefield Girls' High School
Notes Granted 10 January 1963. Crest On a wreath Or, Azure, Argent and Sable, An owl Argent, crowned with an ancient crown Or, standing within a chaplet of leaves Proper and roses silver, barbed and seeded Proper, and between two pens Azure, the quills gold. Escutcheon Per chevron Sable and Azure, in chief two leopards' faces and in base a fleur-de-lys Or; a bordure Ermine. Motto 'Each for all and all for God'
