= Pornography Act (Austria) =

1950 Austrian pornography law

Pornogarphy Act

National Council (Austria)
- Long title: Federal Act of March 31, 1950, on Combating Obscene Publications and Protecting Youth from Moral Danger
- Territorial extent: Austria
- Introduced: March 31, 1950

Text of statute as originally enacted
- Status: In force

The Austrian Pornography Act, also known as the Federal Act of March 31, 1950, on Combating Obscene Publications and Protecting Youth from Moral Danger, is a law that regulates pornography in Austria. It has its roots in legal efforts since 1715 to contain obscene writings and objects. The reason for enacting the Pornography Act was that the catastrophe of World War II had not only crippled the market, but had also led to a shake-up of traditional views of decency and morality. The law was intended to set boundaries of morality and decency in the interest of orderly coexistence. It is intended to restrict the satisfaction of sexual desire, as purely erotic works have a similar effect to drugs due to increased feelings of pleasure and awaken the subconscious urges of young people. It was considered a great injustice that had to be combated to use the superior strength of the instinct for self-preservation and procreation for financial gain. Since its adoption in 1950, the law has not been amended in substance, but has been increasingly liberalized by the courts. Due to its age, it has been criticized as outdated and in need of reform.

== Legal history ==
=== Before 1950: Protection from God's wrath and protection of youth ===
==== First known efforts to combat obscenity ====
Since 1715, efforts have been made to combat obscene writings and objects through legislation. Since the emergence of printing and the possibility of distributing printed material on a larger scale, the authorities saw the need to take action against pornographic writings. The authorities feared that they would incur the wrath of God if they did not take action against this type of obscenity. With society's departure from the commandments of religion, the reasoning changed: instead of God's wrath, the moral sensibilities of the residents were cited, while concern for the youth persisted. Under Maria Theresa of Austria, additional laws were enacted, but these did not have the desired effect, as relevant depictions continued to be distributed. Archduke Francis I of Austria (at that time Francis II as Emperor of the Holy Roman Empire) issued a censorship ordinance in 1795 and a criminal law in 1803 that prohibited the distribution of printed works without censorship and punished it with the loss of business licenses or imprisonment.

==== § 516 – General prohibition of "obscenity" ====
In the year 1852, a new criminal law was introduced that remained valid until 1975. It contained a general clause prohibiting obscene behavior and products and punishing them with up to six months' imprisonment, or up to one year's imprisonment in the case of printed works. Verbal expressions, such as obscene talk at the regulars' table, were also covered. It was sufficient that the act was capable of causing annoyance. Even if the fact only came to light after the event, this criterion was still met. For example, a group of people was convicted for writing obscene letters in a closed circle, where it was impossible to cause public offense. Insults such as "whores" and "dicks" were considered inappropriate but not criminally relevant, as these words were only used to express contempt for others. It only became criminally relevant when sexuality was involved. The narrowing of the term to refer to sexuality only developed in the 15th/16th century.

==== Special laws from the 20th century onwards ====
Since the 20th century, further legislation has been introduced. For instance, the Press Act of 1922 stipulated that printed matter “which, by exploiting youthful instincts, endangers the moral welfare of young people” was not to be distributed to persons under 18-years; furthermore, its “distribution via street vending and newsagents in general” could be prohibited. In addition, an international conventions against obscene publications from 1910 and 1923, aimed at curbing obscene publications, were implemented under international law. These agreements remain in force in Austria to this day and impose an obligation to combat obscene materials, particularly where they are distributed commercially. The 1929 amendment to the Criminal Code introduced provisions for the protection of minors. Similar to Section 2 of the Pornography Act today, these provisions made it a criminal offence to make “offensive” materials accessible to persons under 16 year-olds. At the same time, the offence of “advertisements intended to bring about indecent intercourse” was created, which still exists under the same name in the Criminal Code today. In 1934, the ‘Ordinance for the Protection of Morality and Public Health’ was enacted on the basis of the War Economy Authorisation Act. It prohibited the public display, distribution, advertising or sale of photographs and postcards showing human bodies that were entirely or predominantly naked.

The distribution of contraceptives (e.g. condoms) was also regulated: mechanical contraceptives could only be sold to end consumers by businesses authorised by the police (such as pharmacies, drugstores, bandage suppliers, perfumeries, rubber goods dealers, etc.). Vending machines were permitted only in specially authorised premises; notices indicating such locations were not allowed to be displayed publicly. Distinct restrictions applied to advertising: mechanical devices intended solely for contraception – such as pessaries or sponges – could only be advertised by post or in specialist journals and exclusively to those with a professional interest. Products intended to protect against sexually transmitted diseases, such as condoms or douching devices, could be advertised by means of notices or displays, but only within or in front of authorised establishments and only in an unobtrusive manner, provided the advertising could be seen from the street. Catalogues and price lists could only be handed out to persons without a professional interest upon express request and had to be limited to the standard trade name, the trademark and the price. Advertisements in publications other than trade journals were also prohibited for these (not merely contraceptive) products. As early as the 1930s, the Austrian Supreme Court (OGH) demonstrated the state’s suspicion towards contraception and sex education by classifying a printed publication as grossly obscene because it depicted sexual acts in a manner that violated modesty. This criticism was directed in particular against depictions of unnatural sexual intercourse and obscene attempts at contraception. A further point of criticism was that the text was generally comprehensible and accessible to the general public. The 1934 regulation was incorporated into the 1945 Constitutional Transition Act, but was rarely applied due to its historical origins and the critical view it attracted.

=== 1950–1960: The "Pornography Act" ===
==== Enactment of the Pornography Act ====
===== The legislative process =====
From the late 1940s onwards, there was a debate in the Austrian press about introducing a law to eliminate inferior media products that present a danger to minors. Conservative and Catholic media in particular supported the idea of such a law, and government officials began drafting the first bill as early as 1948. Catholic organizations were particularly keen to see it passed quickly. To emphasise their demands, they initiated a series of actions: nationwide demonstrations, protests against cinema operators who were considered to be providers, and so-called 'self-help' campaigns against producers of sex magazines. Members of the ÖVP actively participated in many of these measures. In contrast, parties on the left of the political spectrum – especially Social Democrats and Communists – were much more critical. Although they supported the idea of general youth protection, they feared that the planned law could serve as a veiled censorship regulation. In their view, the real dangers to young people lay not in 'obscene publications' but in precarious economic conditions, high unemployment and poor housing conditions. In 1950, the Pornography Act was enacted. Even today, this law remains the cornerstone of Austrian pornography legislation. This law still forms the basis of Austrian pornography legislation today. The reason for the pornography act was that World War II had not only crippled the economy, but also led to a shake-up of traditional notions on customs and morals.

The unhealthy lifestyle during wartime, abstinence, and dealing with death created an increased desire for pleasure, especially in the sexual sphere. In order to ensure orderly coexistence within the state and to protect the mental and moral Integrity of the youth, barriers were erected for the sake of morality and decency. According to the Justice Committee of the Austrian National Council, the purpose of the law is to restore traditional customs and practices among Austrian youth that had been destroyed by National Socialism and the war. It has been claimed that works intended solely to arouse erotic feelings have a similar effect to drugs, as they induce heightened feelings of pleasure. These can be particularly dangerous because they can awaken the subconscious urges of young people. All three parties represented in parliament (SPÖ, ÖVP, and KPÖ) rejected it, but with varying degrees of intensity. Fischer (KPÖ) called it a "pimple on the body of the people," while Kranebitter (ÖVP) regarded it as a corrosive mental poison that had spread to the remotest areas of Austria and was seducing the rural youth into moral licentiousness. He warned that this could destroy the Austrian people and called on the National Council to rigorously enforce the law in order to eliminate these plague germs of moral decay and protect the souls of young people, public health, and the dignity of women from contamination. The breeding grounds of the plague bacilli of moral decay must also be radically destroyed. The SPÖ emphasized the necessity of sex education to keep young people away from obscene literature.

Similar laws were also introduced in other countries. As early as 1942, Switzerland passed its first nationwide criminal code, which contained provisions against so-called "obscene literature." In West Germany, a corresponding law followed in 1953 after long and controversial debates. Similar to Austria, political support came primarily from conservative circles and the Catholic Church, which saw the law as a means of combating the supposed moral decline after the Nazi era. However, the resurgent interest in obscenity regulations was not a purely German-speaking phenomenon: France passed a law in 1949 to control youth-related publications, and the United Kingdom also introduced similar legal measures in 1959 with the Obscene Publications Act.

===== The provisions of the Pornography Act =====
- § 1 of the Pornography Act of 1950 differed from the 1934 ordinance, in that it was no longer nudity and contraceptives that were punishable, but "obscenity." The focus was on sexual acts and profit-seeking intentions, because only profit-seeking actors constituted a criminal offence. The government bill emphasized that it was wrong to exploit people's reproductive instincts for financial gain. It made no difference—unlike under the 1934 regulation—whether pornography was displayed publicly or privately. The intention to make a profit included selling, renting, or using it in a bar to attract customers. Employees could also be punished if they were indirectly involved in the profit. The focus on "profit-seeking" was seen by SPÖ member of parliament Strasser as an element of freedom, since only producers, not consumers, were punished. The penalty was a fine and/or a prison sentence of one year.
- § 2 of the Pornography Act did not focus on profit-making intentions, but tightened the youth protection provisions introduced in 1929. It covers content that could endanger the moral or physical development of young people by stimulating lust or misguiding their sexual urges. Depictions such as erotic poses could therefore fall under Section 2. The 1950 law tightened the provisions of the 1929 amendment to the criminal law amendment in several respects: films shown to young people under the age of 16 became punishable even without payment, and the ban was extended to performances and events. The term "offensive" was broadened so that any sexual stimulation that could endanger moral or mental health by arousing lust or misleading the sex drive was punishable as overstimulation or misdirection of sexual feelings. The maximum penalty was doubled from three to six months' imprisonment. The protection of minors was a central concern, and enforcement was the responsibility of the juvenile courts, even if only adults were involved. The government bill explained that raising the age from 16 to 18, as had been suggested on several occasions, was not considered reasonable because 16-year-olds generally already have sufficient mental maturity to better control their sexual urges. Furthermore, their natural sexual development from this age onwards is more in line with society's expectations of acceptable behaviour.

==== Protection of minors in the pornography act ====
The Austrian Pornography Act emphasizes the protection of minors, which is also reflected in the fact that it is enforced by juvenile courts in the name of the law. These were responsible even if the sale of “obscene” items took place exclusively between adults. During the parliamentary debate in 1950, it was noted that older people tend to consume pornography. SPÖ MP Strasser remarked that, given the age distribution, it would be more accurate to refer to this as a “law for the protection of the elderly” rather than a law for the protection of young people, as it is primarily older people who consume pornography. The law remains unchanged to this day, but its implementation has been modified over time. Jurisdiction was initially transferred from the juvenile courts to the single judges of the regional courts, as the matter was considered a rather sensitive issue, and in 1993 it was transferred to the local courts. Since Vienna had the only specialized juvenile court, all cases from eastern Austria had to be heard before this court. For the rest of the country, jurisdiction lay with the regional courts in Linz, Graz, and Innsbruck. Without exception, the proceedings were heard before jury courts. It was stipulated that at least one member had to have expertise in the field of youth welfare, for example as a teacher or youth social worker. These experts were considered particularly suitable for assessing potentially harmful influences on young people. As early as 1989, proceedings under Section 2 of the Pornography Act were assigned to the district courts. Unlike the 1934 Ordinance, Section 1 of the Pornography Act targets the commercial exploitation of ‘obscene’ material, not mere nudity. It is about the commercial exploitation of sexual arousal and not about the depiction of exposed genitals, as clothed persons can appear more lascivious than nude images. In determining what constitutes obscenity, the legal concept developed in relation to Section 516 of the German Criminal Code was applied, which did not provide for a general ban on the depiction of nudity. Only when the depiction places particular emphasis on the genital area and directs the viewer’s attention to these parts of the body does the depiction cross the threshold into ‘obscenity’.

The production and distribution of works such as “The Picture of Dorian Gray” and “Imbert’s Model Studies”, as well as the “M1” model studies, were condemned under the Pornography Act, as they purported to serve only artists and art students. An artistic, aesthetic or educational purpose was only recognised as justification if this purpose was clearly discernible in the work. Medical, forensic or works on the history of morals were unobjectionable as long as they were used in the interests of scientific or artistic education. However, if such works were distributed to a general audience and valued primarily for their erotic content, they could change their character and be deemed obscene. The concept of ‘relative obscenity’ gained prominence in the 1950s and 1960s. It took into account the price, production quality and presentation of works. Expensive luxury editions were tolerated, as they were less widely distributed and purchased only by the wealthy. It was assumed that the ‘poison’ was released only in small doses. The wealthy were also regarded as more immune to negative effects. In 1952, the German Federal Court of Justice ruled that even magazines for homosexuals distributed in relevant establishments could be considered obscene if they did not meet the standards of "normal" healthy people.

=== 1960–2000: The judicial shift ===
==== Liberalization Article 1: Distribution of obscenity ====
The sex education film, Technik der körperlichen Liebe (The Art of Physical Love), was classified as "obscene" in 1970 because it explained that swallowing semen was not harmful to health.

Social attitudes toward sexuality changed in the 1960s, which influenced case law. A milestone was the 1961 decision by the Supreme Court on the use of pleasure-enhancing combination rings (condoms designed to increase stimulation during sexual intercourse through vulcanized nubs). The court of first instance classified these as obscene, but the Supreme Court rejected this ruling and found that only perversions outside of "normal" sexual intercourse could be considered obscene. Aphrodisiacs, which enhance sexual desire and support normal sexual intercourse, were thus considered compatible with sexual morality. The term "marital hygiene products" was coined to circumvent the pornography act, as the purpose of purchasing such items was not apparent. The German courts were slow to take up this line of thinking. As recently as 1962, the Federal Court of Justice ruled that special condoms constituted as obscene. They were not approved until 1972. Despite liberalization, the "average person" in Austria remained prudish. A sex education film was classified as "obscene" in 1970 because it explained that swallowing semen was not harmful to health. The underlying standard of the ‘average person’ referred to by the courts is a fictional, normative figure and does not necessarily correspond to the real views of the population. The Supreme Court emphasized that the pornography act was enacted to protect the majority of the Austrian population. The turning point in the treatment of pornography came in the mid-1970s. While the ban on homosexual relationships and the criminal provision against sexual contact with animals were repealed in 1971 and § 516 was deleted in 1975, the Pornography Act remained untouched. The legislature recognized that the criminal law protection of morality was outdated and that criminal law should only be applied in cases of socially harmful misconduct.

===== Decriminalization of pornography =====
The turning point in the approach to pornography came in the mid-1970s. While the ban on homosexual relationships and the criminal provision against sexual contact with animals were repealed in 1971, and Section 516 of the Criminal Code was deleted in 1975, the Pornography Act remained untouched. The legislature recognized that the criminal law protection of morality was outdated and that criminal law should only be applied to socially harmful offenses. However, the legislature did not draw any conclusions from these findings in the area of pornography law, so the courts pushed ahead with decriminalization. Triggered by the criminal case against Hans S. in 1976 under Section 1 of the Pornography Act, which at that time still provided for a general ban on pornography, a case was heard that revealed the legal grey area surrounding 'obscene' content and its commercial distribution. Section 1 of the Pornography Act made the production, distribution or transmission of writings, illustrations, moving images or objects for 'profit-making purposes' a criminal offense, provided that they were considered 'obscene'; anything that could violate sexual morality was considered obscene. As early as the 1960s, there were so-called specialist shops for marital hygiene, which were considered the precursors of modern sex shops.

These operated on the fringes of legality, as it was unclear whether products such as sex toys or special condoms that supported marital intercourse were to be classified as permissible or as 'obscene' and therefore punishable by law. The line between permissible sex education and criminal erotic literature was also blurred. Anything that appeared likely to violate sexual morality was considered 'obscene' – without there being a precise legal definition. This uncertainty meant that negotiating skills were often decisive in court. Retailers acted accordingly cautiously, presenting their goods discreetly, for example in separate areas or under the shop counter. Hans S. clearly labelled his shop as a sex shop and only allowed people over the age of 18 to enter. Age checks were carried out by asking customers their age and, if necessary, checking their ID. Despite these precautions, Hans S. was sentenced to four months' imprisonment and a fine. The reasoning was that his products were 'obscene' and violated the general sense of modesty and morality. He appealed against the verdict, arguing that his goods merely depicted common sexual practices such as oral or anal intercourse and did not contain any extreme content such as sadomasochistic acts or zoophilia. He arguet that depictions that were already widespread in society could not violate general standards of decency and morality, and the verdict was therefore flawed. Furthermore, his shop was clearly identified as a sex shop, meaning that customers were consciously confronted with such images. The Supreme Court essentially followed this line of argument and upheld the appeal. This led to a demoralization of pornography legislation.

===== Soft and Hard Pornography =====
As early as 1971, sexual criminal law had been reformed to the effect that only socially harmful offenses were to be prosecuted. Anything that was deemed likely to endanger the moral integrity of young people was classified as socially harmful, including free access to pornographic content for under-16s and any form of sexual coercion. Criminal law was not intended to enforce a prudish mindset. Although homosexuality was legalized by a reform, pornography legislation remained unchanged at first. It was only the ruling in the Hans S. case that led to a redefinition of the term "obscenity." Based on social changes and the repeal of Section 516 criminal code, as well as the restrictive wording of Section 218 of the criminal code, the Supreme Court developed a distinction between "soft" and 'hard' pornography. Only content that seriously undermine social order was considered "indecent." Over time, the concept of obscenity has been adapted to social attitudes. In more recent decisions, the term "indecent writing" is interpreted to mean that it must have a shocking and repulsive effect on the average person. As early as the early 1970s, the "normal average person" was characterized as "open-minded" and was expected to be socially integrated and open to the achievements of the present. Only what is considered intolerable by a socially integrated average person is considered "obscene" and is frowned upon under § 1 PornA. Such depictions mainly include "real sex scenes" or "excessively intrusive and repulsive representations of real sexual acts."

Sexual activity was regarded as a natural, value-neutral part of life, and the legislature deliberately decided against a prudish stance. Criminalization based on mere moral convictions was deemed incompatible with democratic principles and rejected as an expression of excessive moral zeal. Irrelevant questions of obscenity, shame, or bad taste no longer had a place in criminal law. "Hard pornography" remained prohibited. The Supreme Court ruled that society accepts pornography in private or closed group of people, as long as the general public is not harassed and young people are protected. He regarded these criteria as being in line with society’s values. However, this did not apply to all types of pornography. The 1977 Senate recognized that certain pornographic depictions, such as violent sexuality, especially of a sadistic and masochistic of that sort, presentations involving persons under the age of 14, vaginal incest, presentations of sexual contact with persons under the age of 19 (since July 1, 2001: under 18 years of age) and the depiction of obtaining sexual contact with persons under 19 years of age or animals, as well as homosexual sex, are generally considered obscene. Furthermore, the depiction of the abuse of defenseless or unconscious persons (e.g. people who are asleep, intoxicated, severely mentally ill or disabled, or who are restrained or paralysed) or exhibitionist acts (towards persons under the age of 14 and certain 14- and 15-year-olds), depictions of obtaining sexual acts (or even just lewd poses or taking off one’s clothes) through deception as well as depictions of sexual acts involving animal abuse and, finally, the depiction of public "obscene" acts as lewd and were prohibited. Unusual but not criminal sexual contacts, such as scatological sex or sexual acts within heterosexual groups, were classified as "relatively obscene."

===== Clarification of the definition of pornography =====
A reasonable interpretation of the law should only regard depictions as ‘obscene’ if, due to specific circumstances, they are likely to undermine social harmony. It remained unclear, however, exactly what fell under the Pornography Act that might have a shocking and repulsive effect on ordinary people who came into contact with it unintentionally, or that might endanger minors. The Supreme Court of Austria recognised that depictions of sexual acts which are reduced to themselves, detached from other life contexts and sensationalistically distorted are to be regarded as pornographic. Erotic depictions which did not exhibit these characteristics did not fall within the scope of the Pornography Act and could therefore be distributed without restriction. Depictions that are reduced to themselves, detached from other life contexts and sensationalistically distorted fall under the term ‘pornography’. However, they are only considered ‘obscene’ within the meaning of Section 1 of the Pornography Act if they grossly disrupt social coexistence, for example through the unintentional viewing or awareness of minors. It was explained that the assessment of whether a work is indecent depends not only on its content, but also on the target audience. Furthermore, the criterion of obscenity is not met if there is no unintentional exposure to minors or if the work is not capable of causing legitimate offence through unintentional exposure. Printed works containing sexual depictions do not constitute an offence under Section 1 provided they are accessible exclusively to a specific group of interested adults, such as customers of sex shops. The Pornography Act is limited to cases in which pornographic material is freely accessible to everyone. Case law has permitted the sale of pornographic products via tobacco shops, newsagents and bookshops, but not via mail order, because the age of the purchasers cannot be verified in such cases.

===== Homosexual pornography =====
The treatment of homosexual pornography, which had already been distributed previously, remained controversial. In 1977, the reinforced Senate of the Supreme Court rejected the view that only criminal homosexual acts constitute "absolutely obscene" pornography. The statements were interpreted differently. Some senates understood this to mean any same-sex acts, while others included the reference to the prohibition of the propagation of homosexuality (Section 220 of the Criminal Code), which made "advertising" for homosexuality (and zoosexuality) ("publicly soliciting or approving in a manner likely to suggest such acts") a criminal offense. According to Duden Etymology 1963, "hard" pornography only exists if there is a threat of mass influence. If the customer base is small or already interested in homosexuality, the depiction is considered "relatively obscene." Absolute obscenity only existed if a large number of heterosexual people were to be seduced into homosexuality. A newly strengthened Senate ended the attempts at liberalization and declared same-sex pornography "absolutely obscene" regardless of the target audience and its suitability for seduction. Same-sex obscenity contradicts the heterosexual orientation of society and is at odds with a legally ordered society. The Senate emphasised that depictions of same-sex acts can only be classified as “obscene” under certain circumstances, namely if they are sensationalised, distorted and obscene. Mass influence is not required for this. The case law remained in force until 1989, when the 1988 Juvenile Court Act transferred jurisdiction for the enforcement under Section 1 of the Pornography Act, this was no longer the responsibility of the juvenile lay courts, but now fell to single judges at the regional courts. The Innsbruck Higher Regional Court used its new jurisdiction to change the law and in 1989 upheld the ruling of the Innsbruck Regional Court, which acquitted a woman of the charge of distributing hardcore pornographic films with lesbian scenes. The court found that the concept of obscenity is not static and evolves culturally. The average person no longer felt disturbed by same-sex acts, and the legalization of homosexual prostitution reflected the changed social attitude.

Even if same-sex pornography continued to be regarded as "hardcore pornography," the Innsbruck Regional Court ruled in 1989 that the act was not punishable (Section 42 of the Austrian Criminal Code). Since then, the distribution of same-sex pornography within the jurisdiction of the Higher Regional Court of Innsbruck (Tyrol and Vorarlberg), while the rest of Austria did not follow this view. Even after the repeal of Section 210 of the criminal code, the Supreme Court ruled that same-sex pornography was "absolutely obscene." An attempt at reform in the 1990s was unsuccessful; according to Elisabeth Holzleithner, the reform failed due to ideological barriers in politics at the time. The Attorney General's Office tried twice to persuade the Supreme Court to revise this decision, but without success. The complaints were dismissed on formal grounds. Courts in Linz and Krems overturned seizures of lesbian pornographic films or upheld them without explicitly recognizing their "absolute obscenity." Consequently, the Supreme Court saw no reason to comment further on this issue. With the exception of Tyrol and Vorarlberg, case law continued to uphold the strict ban on the commercial distribution of homosexual pornography. The few exceptions were limited to the lifting of seizures. With the abolition of criminal offences relating to "advertising" homosexuality (Section 220 of the Criminal Code) and "connections for the promotion of same-sex obscenity" (Section 221 of the Criminal Code) in 1997 led to a change. Styrian courts, such as the Leoben Regional Court and the Graz Higher Regional Court, allowed the commercial distribution of homosexual pornography outside Tyrol and Vorarlberg. The courts emphasized that changes in criminal law and social acceptance of homosexuality meant that homosexual pornography was no longer considered absolutely obscene within the meaning of Section 1. The substantive and procedural equality of homosexual sex and different sex partnerships in 1998 further supported this view. The Pornography Act was interpreted increasingly broadly, both with regard to homosexual pornography and in terms of the distinction between ‘pornography’ and ‘erotica’, which is permitted without restriction. For instance, in 1989 the Innsbruck Regional Court classified a lesbian scene merely as ‘erotic tenderness’, and in 1997 the Vienna Regional Criminal Court ruled that certain depictions could not be classified as ‘excessively intrusive and repulsive’ as they were shown in a static form.

===== SM pornography =====
The legal situation regarding SM pornography was unclear for a long time. In 1977, the Senate of the Austrian Supreme Court considered it to be "hardcore" pornography if it depicted criminal acts such as sexual violence. This included, in particular, sadomasochistic violence and rape scenes, which were classified as "absolutely obscene." Even consensual, even minor injuries motivated by sadomasochism were considered criminal (Section 90 of the Criminal Code) and their pornographic depiction was considered obscene. However, hitting or tying up without injury remained unpunished. Later, the criterion of criminality was partially dropped and based solely on the characteristic of violence. The consensual depiction of masochistic acts was also considered a criminal offense. It was determined that there was no discernible change in social attitudes toward real violence, as violence continued to be considered an unacceptable form of human interaction, with the exception of socially accepted sports.

==== Liberalization of Article 2: Protection of minors ====
In 1951, a picture from the Amazone company in Austria was classified as harmful to the moral and mental development of young people under the age of 16, in particular by arousing lust and misguiding sexual urges.

Even in cases involving actual pornographic depictions, confrontation and youth protection were handled generously. The Leoben Regional Court denied possibility of causing public outrage and endangering young people through the broadcast of pornographic films via cable television, as the broadcast time was between midnight and 4 a.m. and it was pointed out that minors did not have access to the channel. This decision deviated from the Supreme Court's criterion of abstract endangerment. The Leoben Regional Court also interpreted the requirement of profit-seeking more narrowly than previous case law. There was no profit-seeking behaviour because the cable network operators did not charge any fees, did not broadcast its own advertising, and offered 33 other programs. This did not lead to a significant increase in the number of people interested in subscribing and made video rental more economically attractive. In order to assess "offensiveness" within the meaning of Section 2 of the Pornography Act, case law has always referred to the "normal, healthy average person." The decisive factor was whether a publication was likely to endanger a normally developed person under the age of sixteen by arousing lust or misleading sexual instincts. No consideration was given to what young people themselves considered appropriate, as they are characterized by an extraordinary thirst for experience. Therefore, strict standards were applied to the exhibition of sexually provocative images in order to protect young people from unfavorable influences and prepare them for their true tasks in life. In the area of § 2, liberalization tendencies were already apparent in the 1960s.

As recently as 1951, the court prohibited the display or posting of the Amazone poster, which showed a woman in underwear putting on a stocking and exposing a large part of her thigh displaying, or posting the Amazone poster, which showed a woman in underwear putting on a stocking and exposing a large part of her thigh, highlighting her voluptuous figure, pronounced curves, and low-cut bra, in places accessible to persons under the age of 16, in particular on billboards, advertising columns, shop windows, and business premises, on the grounds that the Amazone advertising poster was likely to have a harmful influence on the mental and moral development of young people by arousing lust, as evidenced by the defacement and smearing of a number of posters with obscene drawings. In contrast, the Supreme Court ruled in 1961 that the depiction of a woman with a low-cut neckline was not harmful to minors if the sexual stimulation did not exceed the level of everyday life. However, later decisions took the opposite view until the Supreme Court finally ruled in 1974 that the threshold of irritation should be assessed in relation to daily sensory overload. The "normal average person" was considered to be open-minded.

The Supreme Court corrected the legislature's Pornography Act by referring to the requirement of suitability for endangering moral and health development and reversing the tightening of the law in 1950. The "stimulation" of lust was now once again "overstimulation." The Supreme Court changed its case law and no longer considered an "erotic association" or the "mere arousal of curiosity" to be sufficient grounds for criminal liability. Now, only "excessive sexual fantasies" were considered punishable under Section 2 of the Pornography Act. Body language and facial expressions remained the key factors. A decision by the Leoben Regional Court relieved broadcasting companies of responsibility under § 2 PornA, which was transferred to providers of "offensive" content on the Internet. It was explained that it was not the providers but the owners of the television sets who were responsible for providing access to children under the age of 16. In a landmark decision, the Styrian provincial government approved AIDS prevention brochures for children aged 14 and older and, after obtaining a child and adolescent psychiatric opinion, determined that young people above this age can no longer be seduced into homosexuality, but should integrate their own inclinations into a healthy development.

== Proposal for a new law ==
A new draft of the pornography act proposed to only cover visual representations (excluding written material) and to remove the vague term "obscenity," which also included same-sex acts. The term had previously been interpreted restrictively by the courts. The draft also proposed that only pornographic depictions involving minors, sexual violence, and depictions involving abused animals should be punishable. The draft would also exclude same-sex acts from being classified as pornography. In addition, the distribution of pornography would generally become punishable, regardless of any profit motive.
