= Spanner Trust =

BDSM civil liberties advocacy organization

The Spanner Trust is a United Kingdom organisation set up to campaign for the right for adults to take part in consensual BDSM activities without fear of prosecution. It was set up after the Operation Spanner court case. As part of its campaign, the Spanner Trust has made a number of submissions to government consultations regarding sadomasochistic activities.

In 2005 the Spanner Trust helped create Backlash, a group opposed to the Government's plans to criminalise possession of what it has termed "extreme pornography". The law covers acts between consenting adults, and realistic depictions of acts.

In the Criminal Justice and Immigration Act 2008, the British Government cited the Spanner case (Brown [1994] 1 AC 212) as justification for criminalising images of consensual acts, as part of its proposed criminalisation of possession of "extreme pornography".
