= Sex Workers Union =

UK labour group for sex workers

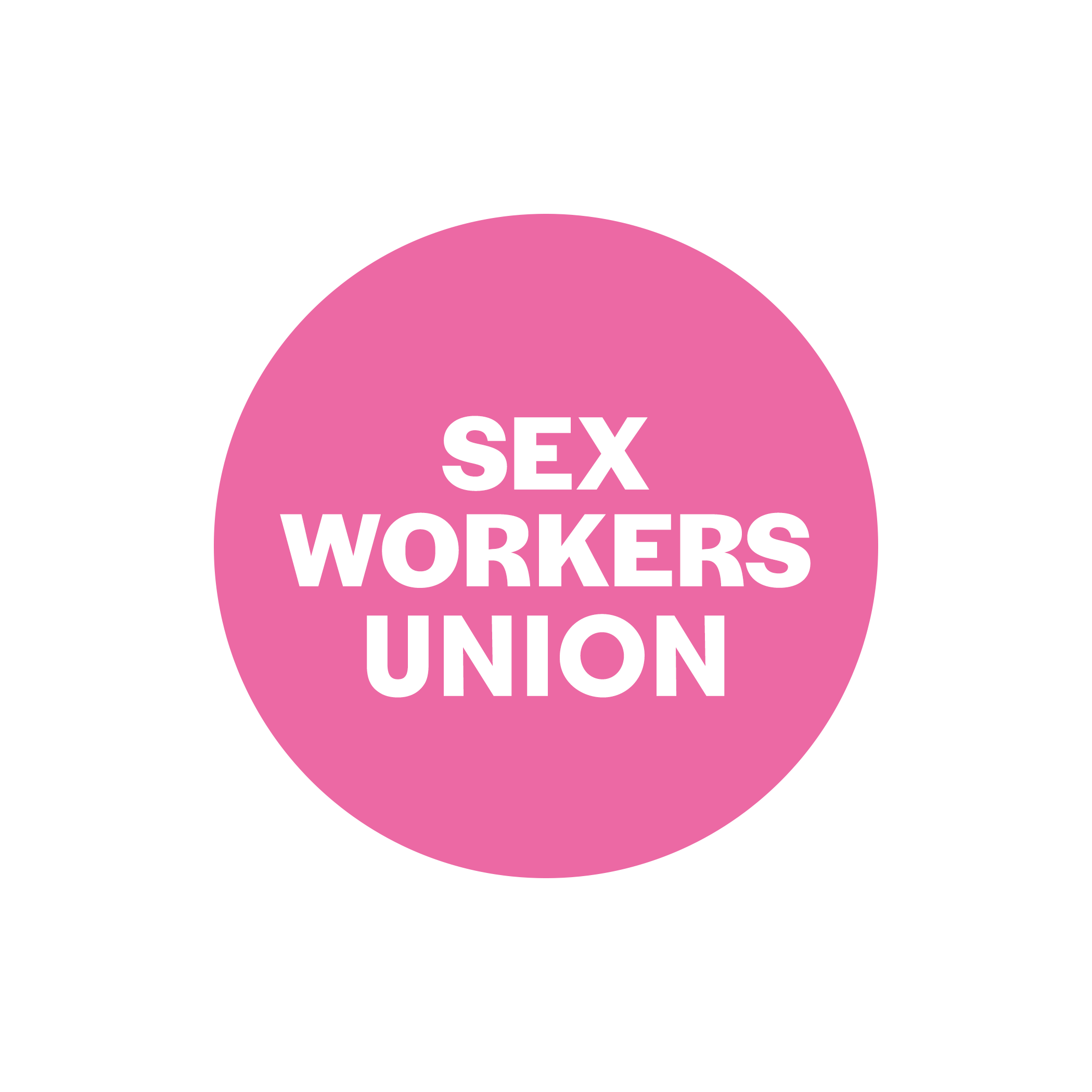
The Sex Workers Union created in 2023

In the United Kingdom, the Sex Workers Union (SWU) is the sex workers' branch of the trade union Bakers, Food and Allied Workers Union (BFAWU).

The SWU represents people including full-service sex workers, strippers, webcam models and pornographic actors.

== History ==
The organisation was established in 2018 and was formerly called the United Sex Workers (USW), a branch of United Voices of the World (UVW).

In 2023, the USW disbanded and its former members joined the Bakers, Food and Allied Workers' Union (BFAWU) as the Sex Workers' Union branch.

== Campaigns ==
As the USW, members campaigned against Deliveroo's policy on sex workers and said that this led Deliveroo to change the policy.

The union believes that its members should be classified as workers under UK labour laws, and takes legal action on this matter. For instance, in 2020 Sonia Nowak with the aid of the union won a legal case classifying strippers as workers, not independent contractors.

The SWU has campaigned against the closure of strip clubs.

The union has been involved in numerous campaigns and protests, including the "Red Umbrella" campaign, which aims to raise awareness about the violence and discrimination faced by sex workers.

== Media coverage ==
The Sex Workers Union has been subject to coverage in Studies in Political Economy, Vice, and Social and Legal Studies.

== See also ==
- International Union of Sex Workers
- Pornography in the United Kingdom
- Prostitution in the United Kingdom
- Sex workers' rights
