= Children and Young Persons (Harmful Publications) Act 1955 =

Act of the Parliament of the United Kingdom

Children and Young Persons (Harmful Publications) Act 1955 (Note: Section 5(1).)
- Act of Parliament
- Parliament of the United Kingdom
- Long title: An Act to prevent the dissemination of certain pictorial publications harmful to children and young persons.
- Citation: 3 & 4 Eliz. 2. c. 28
- Introduced by: Gwilym Lloyd George
- Territorial extent: England and Wales; Scotland; Northern Ireland (section 4 only); (Note: Section 5(3).)

Dates
- Royal assent: 6 May 1955
- Commencement: 6 June 1955 (Note: Section 5(4).)
Other legislation
Amended by	Expiring Laws Act 1969; Courts Act 1971; Criminal Procedure (Scotland) Act 1975; Criminal Justice Act 1982; Police and Criminal Evidence Act 1984
Relates to	Obscene Publications Act 1959; Customs and Excise Management Act 1979

Status: Amended

Text of statute as originally enacted

Revised text of statute as amended

Text of the Children and Young Persons (Harmful Publications) Act 1955 as in force today (including any amendments) within the United Kingdom, from legislation.gov.uk.

The Children and Young Persons (Harmful Publications) Act 1955 (3 & 4 Eliz. 2. c. 28) is an act of the Parliament of the United Kingdom that prohibited comics that were thought to be harmful to children. The act was introduced by the Home Secretary, Gwilym Lloyd George (a son of former prime minister David Lloyd George), in response to the publication of horror comics which had become popular by the 1950s. This issue was drawn to the attention of Parliament by the National Union of Teachers and by the Archbishop of Canterbury, Geoffrey Fisher.

== Provisions ==
Section 1 defined the kind of publication which the act was intended to deal with. It applied to:

...any book, magazine or other like work which is of a kind likely to fall into the hands of children or young persons and consists wholly or mainly of stories told in pictures (with or without the addition of written matter), being stories portraying—

(a) the commission of crimes; or
(b) acts of violence or cruelty; or
(c) incidents of a repulsive or horrible nature;

in such a way that the work as a whole would tend to corrupt a child or young person into whose hands it might fall.

"Child or young person" means someone aged under 18.

Section 2(1) made it a criminal offence in England and Wales and Scotland to print, publish, sell or let on hire such a comic, or to possess one for the purpose of selling or letting it. The offence is punishable by imprisonment for up to 4 months or a £1,000 fine (increased from £100 in 1975 (Scotland) and 1982 (England)).

The offence was originally triable before a jury. However it is today a summary offence.

Section 2(2) requires the consent of the Attorney General to prosecute the offence in England and Wales.

Section 3 gives the courts the power to issue search warrants and to order forfeiture of harmful publications.

Section 4, the only section of the Act that applies to Northern Ireland, prohibits the importation of harmful publications into the United Kingdom. The prohibition also applies to "any plate prepared for the purpose of printing copies of any such work and any photographic film prepared for that purpose." Section 4 is the origin of the Royal Mail prohibition against mailing horror comics and the matrices used to print them. To contravene the section is an offence under the Customs and Excise Management Act 1979, punishable with up to 7 years' imprisonment.

Section 5 includes "No provision of this Act, other than the provisions of the last foregoing section, shall extend to Northern Ireland." It also originally included a sunset clause under which the act was to expire on 31 December 1965, unless Parliament decided otherwise. The Expiring Laws Act 1969 made the act permanent.

== Prosecutions ==
There were no prosecutions under the act until 1970, when there were two. The Attorney General refused to prosecute in 46 other cases between 1955 and 1982. There were no offences under the act recorded between April 2004 and February 2008.

== See also ==
- Obscene Publications Act 1959
- Comics Code Authority (United States)
