= Being Bisexual =

- Genre: Radio documentary
- Running time: 30 minutes
- Country of origin: United Kingdom
- Language: English
- Home station: BBC World Service
- Original release: 2017

Being Bisexual is a 2017 BBC World Service 30 minute radio documentary special about life as a bisexual. It was led by Nichi Hodgson.

== See also ==
- Bisexuality in entertainment
