= Nichi Hodgson =

British journalist, broadcaster, and author (born 1983)

- Born: 9 September 1983 (age 43); Wakefield, West Yorkshire, England
- Education: Wakefield Girls' High School
- Alma mater: University of York
- Occupations: Journalist, author
- Years active: 2006–present
- Spouse: Ferdie Ahmed (m. 2020)
- Website: nichihodgson.com

Nichi Hodgson (born 9 September 1983) is a British journalist, broadcaster, and author. She was one of the first British journalists to court-report via Twitter, covering the 2012 obscenity trial, R v Peacock.

== Early life and education ==
Hodgson was born and grew up in Wakefield, West Yorkshire. She was educated at the private Wakefield Girls' High School via an assisted place, a scholarship scheme introduced by the Conservatives and continued by Tony Blair. She graduated from the University of York with a first class honours degree in English and Related Literature in 2006. Hodgson then undertook a National Council for the Training of Journalists diploma in magazine journalism at Harlow College in Essex.

== Journalism career ==
Following internships at the BBC, New Statesman, and the Erotic Review, Hodgson worked in legal journalism at The Law Society, before moving to Standpoint magazine as production editor and contributing writer. While working in the unpaid internships in London, she worked as a part-time dominatrix. During this time she began to freelance for The Guardian, BBC Radio 5 Live, BBC Radio 2 and Sky News, commenting on gender, civil liberties and technology issues. In 2012, she reported on rival Tokyo Pride celebrations in Japan for the New Statesman, The Guardian and BBC Radio. She left Standpoint to go freelance soon after. She wrote the 'Sexual Adventurer' column for Men's Health which ran until 2016.

Hodgson has written about sexuality and society from a psychological and investigative perspective, covering everything from the science of BDSM, to dating apps that run criminal record checks. She openly criticised a Conservative MP who once euphemistically invited her to "tea", before telling her he couldn't take her to the Buckingham Palace Garden Party because of her sex-positive journalism. In 2017, a video of Hodgson debating Mike Buchanan on Kay Burley's Sky News show went viral when men's rights activist Buchanan failed to respond to her statistical evidence of discrimination against women. Buchanan conceded that one path to equality would be for men to do housework.

Hodgson is a regular commentator on Sky News and has also reviewed the newspapers on Sky Sunrise. She was also a regular guest on BBC3, BBC World News, BBC Radio 2 and 4, and Eamonn Holmes' former TalkRadio show. Her documentary, Can Porn Be Ethical? was broadcast on BBC Radio 4 in 2015, and she was a guest in an episode of Late Night Woman's Hour alongside Caitlin Moran in 2016. Her radio documentary, Being Bisexual, was broadcast in July 2017 on the BBC World Service, for which she was short-listed for the DIVA Journalist of the Year 2018 award.

In May 2018 she appeared on The Big Questions calling for a reinvention of sex robots, the use of tech to heal PTSD and trauma, and the potential care of elderly people with AI and robotic assistance. Hodgson has written for the Times business insert Raconteur on health and technology issues, and The Critic magazine on gender and mental health. From 2019, she contributed to ex-Head of BBC News James Harding's new launch, Tortoise Media. Topics covered include the future of contraception and the abuse facing LGBT+ people on dating apps. In July 2019 she appeared in episode two of Romesh Ranganathan's BBC One show, The Ranganation. In September 2021, Hodgson presented Why Bi? for Virgin Radio, a three-part series on bisexuality.

As of September 2021, Hodgson has been a regular paper reviewer and debater on GB News. She has debated Mike Parry on the topic of food banks and Michael Portillo on Boris Johnson. Hodgson is currently writing a memoir about her experience of psychosis.

== Literary career ==
Her first book, Bound To You, a BDSM memoir which she wrote in just six weeks, was published by Hodder & Stoughton in 2012. Her second book, The Curious History of Dating, was published by Little, Brown in January 2017. Spanning a three-hundred-year period, the book looks at the history of courtship and marriage from a feminist perspective, and includes the history of LGBT and mixed race relationships. A review in the Law Gazette described it as a "pacy, intelligent and authoritative account with bags of wit".

== Personal life ==
She is bisexual. Hodgson got engaged to bar chain owner Ferdie Ahmed in January 2019 and married him at Marylebone Town Hall on 4 November 2020. In August 2022, Hodgson announced she was pregnant. In February 2023, she announced the birth of her daughter.
