= Feminists Against Censorship =

Feminists Against Censorship (FAC) is a large network of women founded in 1989 in the United Kingdom to present the feminist arguments against censorship, particularly of sexual materials, and to defend individual sexual expression.

== Background ==
FAC originally came together in response to the passage of a resolution by the annual general meeting of the National Council for Civil Liberties in 1989 condemning pornography. Spearheaded by British activists Linda Semple and Roz Kaveney, meetings of feminists were organised in London to begin producing documents and speaking up for the feminist position in support of free expression.

FAC is unfunded and has no paid staff or offices. Individual members write submissions to government bodies, letters, and other publications. FAC and its members have produced several books presenting research reviews, analysis, and personal experiences related to censorship and pornography. They are also available to speak to the public and have joined university debates as well as appearing on television and participating in radio discussions.

They are a member of Backlash, which was formed in 2005 in order to oppose a new law criminalising possession of "extreme pornography". FAC responded to the Government consultation on this law.

== See also ==
- Civil libertarianism
- Civil liberties
- Sex-positive feminism
- Sex-positive movement
