= Henry Hodge =

British judge (1944–2009)

Sir Henry Hodge OBE
- Born: Henry Egar Garfield Hodge; 12 January 1944; Peterborough, England
- Died: 18 June 2009 (aged 65); University College Hospital, London
- Education: Chigwell School
- Alma mater: Balliol College, Oxford
- Occupations: Solicitor, High Court judge
- Years active: 1970–2009
- Political party: Labour
- Spouse(s): Miranda Tufnell (m. 1971; div. 1975) Margaret Oppenheimer (m. 1978)
- Children: 2
- Awards: OBE (1973); Knight Bachelor (2004)

Sir Henry Egar Garfield Hodge OBE (12 January 1944 – 18 June 2009) professionally styled The Hon Mr Justice Hodge, was an English solicitor and Justice of the High Court of England and Wales.

== Early life ==
Born in Peterborough, Hodge was educated at Chigwell School and read law at Balliol College, Oxford, graduating in 1965.

== Career ==
Hodge qualified as a solicitor in 1970. He then joined the Child Poverty Action Group, working as its solicitor and deputy director until 1977. In 1974, he became chairman of the National Council for Civil Liberties (now Liberty).

In 1977 he founded Hodge Jones & Allen with partners Peter Jones and Patrick Allen, where all three practised. He served as deputy chairman of the Legal Aid Board from 1996 to 1999. He was also a vice-president of the Law Society.

=== Judge ===
Hodge became a Recorder in 1993, and a Circuit Judge in October 1999, when he retired from his firm. He was appointed Chief Immigration Adjudicator in 2001, by Derry Irvine then the Lord Chancellor.

On 1 October 2004, he became the third Solicitor to sit as a High Court judge in England and Wales, after Sir Michael Sachs (appointed in 1993) and Sir Lawrence Collins (appointed in 2000). In April 2005, he became President of the Asylum and Immigration Tribunal.

=== Politics ===
Hodge confessed that he was "married to the Labour Party", for which he contested the new seat of Croydon South in the February 1974 general election, but Sir William Clark won the seat for the Conservatives. Hodge then became a Councillor in the London Borough of Islington, representing St Georges ward from 1974 to 1978.

In the 1990s, he and his wife persuaded Tony Blair and his wife Cherie to move to the London Borough of Islington, with the couple eventually buying the house next to the Hodges'. During this period, Hodge and his wife assisted Blair and his team to formulate New Labour. As a result, Hodge became a member of the "1,000 Club" of leading Labour party donors.

== Personal life and honours ==
Hodge married first, in 1971, Miranda Tufnell; they divorced in 1975. He married Labour politician and fellow Islington borough councillor Margaret Watson (née Oppenheimer) in 1978, with whom he had two daughters. Hodge was appointed Officer of the Order of the British Empire (OBE) for services to the Social Security Advisory Committee in the 1993 Birthday Honours, and was knighted in 2004.

Hodge enjoyed motorcycling, and supported Arsenal.

== Death ==
Having suffered a series of heart problems from 2007 which had required regular hospitalisation, Hodge was diagnosed with Acute myeloid leukaemia in September 2008, which after four sessions of chemotherapy was followed by a bone marrow transplant in February 2009. Taken ill again in June 2009, he was admitted to University College Hospital, London, where he died of liver failure on 18 June 2009, aged 65.

== Bibliography ==
- Law Society Gazette, "The Inn crowd", 13 January 2005, p. 22.
- Profile from the Judicial Studies Board
- Appointment of new Chief Immigration Adjudicator, Government press release, 20 March 2001
