= Consenting Adult Action Network =

UK grassroots network

The Consenting Adult Action Network (CAAN) is a grassroots network of individuals in the United Kingdom that was formed in 2008 to protest and oppose laws restricting activities between consenting adults, most notably the criminalisation of possession of "extreme pornography" under Section 63 of the Criminal Justice and Immigration Act 2008.

== History ==
On 14 June and 22 August, they attempted to seek advice on what material might be caught by the law. They took a dossier of images to three major police forces, although none of them could yet say which pictures would be deemed illegal.

On 21 October 2008, they organised a protest with Ben Westwood against the law on "extreme pornography".

They were awarded "Specialists Website of the Year" by the London Gay Sex and Fetish Awards 2008.

On 25 January 2009, the day before the law on "extreme pornography" came into effect, CAAN protested in London. They were supported by Backlash and The Spanner Trust. The protest was attended by Peter Tatchell.

March 2010, CAAN announced they were to publish a book "Beyond the Circle: Sexuality & discrimination in heteronormative Britain" written by John Ozimek.

== Issues ==
CAAN is concerned about several issues regarding consenting adults:

- The law on "extreme pornography", since it criminalises possession of images involving consenting adults, including staged acts, and screenshots from legal films.
- Clauses in the Safeguarding Vulnerable Groups Act 2006 that ban people from working in jobs involving children or "vulnerable adults" if they possess "sexually explicit images depicting violence against human beings". The government state that 11.3 million will have to register with the scheme, although the number has been estimated by others at over 14 million.
- As of the Sexual Offences Act 2003, sexual images of 16- and 17-year-olds are treated as child pornography, even though the age of consent remains at 16 (CAAN states it has no interest in altering the age of consent, however they believe this change in the law to be "misguided and disproportionate").
- Government plans to criminalise prostitution.
- Plans to recategorise lapdancing clubs as "sex encounter" establishments.

== See also ==
- Backlash (pressure group)
- Campaign Against Censorship
- Consensual crime
- Operation Spanner
- Right to pornography
