= R v Peacock =

English obscenity law case

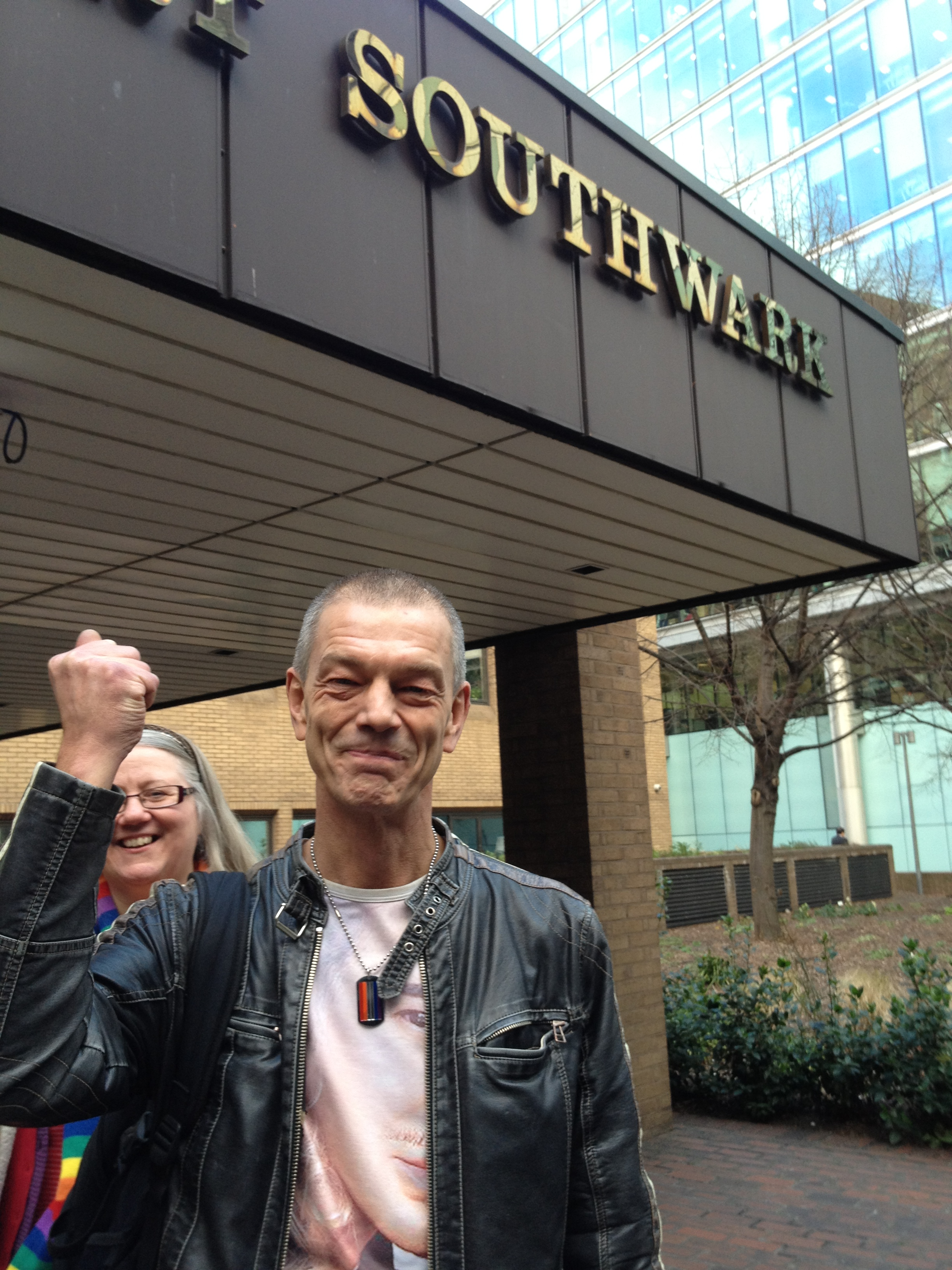
- Michael Peacock celebrating his victory outside Southwark Crown Court.
- Court: Southwark Crown Court
- Full case name: R v Michael Peacock
- Decided: 6 January 2012

R v Peacock was an English Crown Court case that was a test of the Obscene Publications Act 1959. In December 2009, the defendant, a male escort named Michael Peacock, had been charged by the Metropolitan Police for selling hardcore gay pornography that the police believed had the ability to "deprave or corrupt" the viewer, which was illegal under the Obscene Publications Act. He was subsequently acquitted through a trial by jury in January 2012.

At the time, Peacock was the only individual to have successfully pleaded 'not guilty' under the Act in a case involving the kind of gay BDSM pornography which he published. Legal experts said that, following the case, the Obscene Publications Act now "made no sense". It was also notable as one of the early cases in the English courts where live tweeting was a significant source of reporting and publicising the deliberations of the case following the 14 December 2011 guidance from the Lord Chief Justice which allowed tweeting in English Courts.

== Details of the case ==
=== Arrest and charge ===
The man at the centre of the trial was Michael Peacock (born 6 September 1958), an independent male escort who had been operating in the profession since November 2004. A former railway worker, Peacock decided to enter the sex industry in his mid-40s. At the time of the police investigation, Peacock advertised his services on his own personal website, entitled "Sleazy Michael", and also advertised hardcore pornographic DVDs for sale on the Craigslist website. Some of these DVDs included films which featured extreme sexual acts between men, such as BDSM (whipping, staged kidnapping and rape play), fisting and urolagnia.

While these acts were themselves not illegal in the United Kingdom at the time, the Human Exploitation and Organised Crime Command of the Metropolitan Police considered such DVDs illegal under the Obscene Publications Act of 1959, which prohibited the sale of materials that could "deprave and corrupt" the viewer. In January 2009 they sent an undercover police officer to purchase some of these DVDs from Peacock at his home in Finsbury Park, North London. On 14 December 2009, the Metropolitan Police charged Peacock with six counts under the Obscene Publications Act 1959. If found guilty he could have faced a five-year prison sentence.

=== Trial ===
"Perhaps illogically, of these sexual acts, fisting and urination are completely legal to perform in real life; and thus it is only the representation of these acts on film which may be considered obscene and therefore attract criminal liability. Consequently many pornographic film producers operate a "four finger rule" to avoid the risk of criminal prosecution. This means that in such films only four fingers are inserted into the performers' vagina or anus, rather than the entire fist. It could be argued that this is an entirely arbitrary distinction as the act of fisting itself is not illegal. However, many pornographic film producers remain risk-averse and therefore the presumption that urination and fisting are obscene has endured as it seems that no previous defendant has been prepared to test the law in this area by electing jury trial."

— Myles Jackman, defence solicitor.

After being postponed twice, the trial began on 2 January 2012, at Southwark Crown Court in South London. The prosecution claimed that several of the scenes featured in the pornographic DVDs which Peacock sold had the ability to "deprave and corrupt" the viewer and as such were illegal. They suggested that the customers purchasing the DVDs had not been aware of their extreme content, a claim Peacock denied, asserting that those purchasing the pornography "asked me for specific titles or niches, and knew exactly what they were getting".

Peacock's defence was conducted by the law firm Hodge Jones & Allen. His defence solicitor Nigel Richardson described his client as being a well-known member of the London gay community, and remarked that "The whole idea of something being depraved or corrupt is outdated." Another of the advocates for the defence, Myles Jackman, tweeted throughout the trial, using the hashtag of #obscenitytrial, and through Twitter helped to build up an online support base for Peacock. Jackman recognised it as having important implications for UK law, noting that the verdict would "ultimately clarify the law on the representation" of specialist sexual acts such as BDSM and urolagnia. During the trial, the defence called for expert evidence from academics studying sex and the media.

The jury, of both men and women, were shown several hours of footage from Peacock's DVDs – including images on BDSM, urolagnia and a man being punched in the testicles – in an attempt to decide whether they could "deprave or corrupt" the viewer. Richardson later related that although "they were quite shocked initially, they started to look quite bored very quickly". During the trial, the court had repeatedly warned the jury not to convict on any "impulse of homophobic disgust" that they might have regarding the acts taking place in the DVDs.

After four days, the trial came to an end on 6 January 2012. In summing up the case, the Recorder James Dingemans QC stated that the jury must decide whether the pornography did breach the Act, and noted that "in a civilised society, lines must be drawn". It subsequently took the jury two hours to come to a verdict of "not guilty", deciding that the scenes depicted in the DVDs were unable to deprave or corrupt any viewer watching them. Nigel Richardson later told the press that the jury had recognised that the pornography found in the DVDs would only be seen by "gay men specifically asking for this type of material" and not by the general public.

== Aftermath ==
Legal experts said that officers from SCD9, the specialist team within the Metropolitan Police, would be meeting with the Crown Prosecution Service (the prosecuting legal authority in England) and the British Board of Film Classification (responsible for film and DVD control and censorship) to review their guidelines following the jury's decision. Specialist lawyers said the ruling may change the material that adult film producers will make and supply. Sex worker turned writer Brooke Magnanti said the publishing industry would be relieved by the outcome of the case.

When asked if he felt he had suffered any homophobia during the experience, Peacock denied it, stating that "Personally, I didn't feel there was any homophobic angle to the questioning, either by the arresting officers or in court. And full credit to the jury. I noticed a distinct change in their reactions over the course of the trial."

Defense solicitor Myles Jackman claimed that the verdict had been "a significant victory for common sense". He considered the trial to be the "most significant in a decade", believing that it "could be the final nail in the coffin for the Obscene Publications Act in the digital age because the jury's verdict shows that normal people view consensual adult pornography as a part of everyday life and are no longer shocked, depraved or corrupted by it". Jackman had been responsible for maintaining the Twitter account devoted to the trial, and following the verdict, a flurry of Twitter users tweeted in support of Peacock, many criticising the fact that the case ever came to court in the first place.

Various experts in the field of sex and pornography claimed that the trial was significant because it reflected that the general British public understood sexuality in a new way, something that the law at the time didn't take into account. The academic sexologist Feona Attwood of Sheffield Hallam University, who herself had attended the trial, claimed that "I think the law does not make sense. All the evidence that was heard was about whether the material had the ability to harm and corrupt. The question now is, what does that actually mean? What is significant is that the jury understood [the issues at stake]."

The conservative pressure group Mediawatch-uk argued that the trial reflected a need to make the Obscene Publications Act more specific; the group's director Vivienne Pattison claimed that the R v Peacock case "illustrates the problem" with the law as it stood, noting that "There is not a list which says what is obscene and what is not. It makes it incredibly difficult to get a conviction on that". In response to the events of the trial she argued that while "As a society we are moving to a place where porn is considered as kind of fun between consenting adults," she felt that this was problematic because in her opinion "porn is damaging."

=== Media response ===
Writing for The Guardian, Nichi Hodgson proclaimed that the verdict represented "a great day for English sexual liberties", proceeding to state "Thank god the jury had sense to see that in 2012, telling others what is depraved – and prosecuting them for "debasing" your mind if they publish material featuring it and you are privy to it, is as absurd as it is anachronistic."
