= Backlash (pressure group) =

UK group opposing the 2008 law criminalising possession of "extreme pornography"

Backlash is an umbrella group formed in 2005 to coordinate opposition to the "Consultation on the possession of extreme pornographic material" issued in the United Kingdom jointly by the Home Office and the Scottish Executive. Its stated belief is that the proposals underlying the consultation represent an unjustified assault on freedom of speech and freedom of expression.

"See no evil" was a forum and wiki provided by Backlash as an independent platform for the discussion of the proposed UK law on the possession of "extreme pornography".

The group receives pro bono legal advice from the lawyer Myles Jackman.

== Organisations ==
Backlash consists of Feminists Against Censorship, Unfettered, Ofwatch, The Spanner Trust, the Libertarian Alliance, the Campaign Against Censorship, the Sexual Freedom Coalition, the Society for Individual Freedom, SM Dykes and the International Union of Sex Workers.

== See also ==
- Consenting Adult Action Network
- Right to pornography
- Spanner case
