= Simon Walsh =

British barrister

- Education: University of Oxford; City University London
- Occupation: Barrister

Simon Walsh (born 1962), is a British barrister who specialised in police, licensing, and ecclesiastical law. He served as a magistrate in the City of London (2000–10), and as Alderman for the Ward of Farringdon Without (2000–13).

== Early life ==
Walsh was educated at Manchester Grammar School, before reading modern languages at Balliol College, Oxford, graduating in 1984. He then studied law at City University, London, where he qualified as a lawyer in 1986. He was called to the bar in 1987 and became a magistrate in 2000.

== Career ==
Walsh sat on the Central London Valuation Tribunal, which he chaired from 1992, and was chairman of the City of London Corporation police committee from 2002 to 2005, then deputy chairman. He also chaired the City of London Licensing Authority from 2007.

He was formerly an aide to the Mayor of London, Boris Johnson, who appointed him a member of the London Fire and Emergency Planning Authority, a position which he held until 31 October 2011.

As a barrister, he was a self-employed member of the 5 Essex Court chambers.

In August 2012, Walsh was charged with possessing five images of "extreme pornography", which were not found by police on his computers, but as email attachments on a Hotmail server account. He was found not guilty on all counts. Three images were of urethral sounding, and two of anal fisting. The images were all of consensual adult sexual activity. He was defended by Myles Jackman.
