= Obscene Publications Act 1964 =

Act of the Parliament of the United Kingdom

Obscene Publications Act 1964 (Note: Section 3(1).)
- Act of Parliament
- Parliament of the United Kingdom
- Long title: An Act to strengthen the law for preventing the publication for gain of obscene matter and the publication of things intended for the production of obscene matter.
- Citation: 1964 c. 74
- Territorial extent: England and Wales (Note: Section 3(3).)

Dates
- Royal assent: 31 July 1964
- Commencement: 31 August 1964 (Note: Section 3(2).)
Other legislation
Amends	Obscene Publications Act 1959

Status: Current legislation

Text of statute as originally enacted

Revised text of statute as amended

Text of the Obscene Publications Act 1964 as in force today (including any amendments) within the United Kingdom, from legislation.gov.uk.

The Obscene Publications Act 1964 (c. 74) (OPA) is an act of the Parliament of the United Kingdom providing minor additional provisions in addition to the Obscene Publications Act 1959 (7 & 8 Eliz. 2. c. 66), which is the primary statute in the area.

The OPA 1964 was specifically designed to strengthen the law around obscenity, particularly regarding the production of obscene articles for sale and the materials used in the production of obscene articles.

== See also ==
- Obscene Publications Act 1959
- Censorship in the United Kingdom
