= Public nuisance =

Offence in English criminal law

In English criminal law, public nuisance is an act, condition or thing that is illegal because it interferes with the rights of the general public.

== In Australia ==
In Kent v Johnson, the Supreme Court of the ACT held that public nuisance is "an unlawful act or omission ... which endangers the lives, safety, health, property or comfort of the public or by which the public are obstructed in the exercise or enjoyment of any right common to all". And also, public nuisance is a criminal offense at some common law and by statute under some states. To establish a prima facie case of public nuisance, a private individual will have to prove: (1) title to sue, (2) that the interference is with a public right and (3) that the defendant's interference is substantial and unreasonable.

1. Title to sue: In the case Walsh v Ervin, as the general principle is usually stated, an individual cannot sue alone for relief in respect of a nuisance to a public highway unless he has sustained some particular damage, in the sense of some substantial injury, direct and not merely consequential, beyond that suffered by the public generally.
2. Interference is with a public right: In the case Attorney-General v PYA Quarries Ltd, a nuisance which is so widespread in its range or so indiscriminate in its effect that it would not be reasonable to expect one person to take proceedings on his own responsibility to put a stop to it, but that it should be taken on the responsibility of the community at large
3. The interference is substantial and unreasonable: The interference must be substantial and unreasonable in order to establish public nuisance. In modern world, daily inconveniences and annoyances are part of unreasonable and substantial interference.

However, there are some examples that shows even if it could cause interference to the public, there is no public nuisance. For example, in Maitland v Raisbeck, "it would seem that every driver of a vehicle on the road would be turned into an insurer in respect of latent defects in this machines", even if a danger was created because of moral use of vehicle. In the case Silservice Pty Ltd v Supreme Bready Pty Ltd, Roper Chief Judge in Equity stated that:

it appears that in cases of this kind if the defendant has available to him reasonable means of removing or avoiding the obstruction, he is responsible for the nuisance if he does not adopt those means. The test is not whether an obstruction has been caused, but whether the obstruction could reasonably have been avoided. I think, however, that this is not the sole test of whether a person is responsible for the nuisance caused by the assembly of a crowd of people, and that a more absolute liability rests upon the person whose business involves the gathering together of a crowd, or who, apart from any consideration of the bona fide conduct of his business, deliberately continues to gather the crowd. [citations omitted]

== Discussion ==
The nuisance action began in twelfth century England as a criminal writ, belonging only to the Crown. It was used in cases that involved encroachments upon the King's land or the blocking of public roads or waterways. The King sought to punish these criminal infringements, commonly known as "purprestures", through criminal proceedings. Over time, activities prosecuted as public nuisances included everything from embezzling public funds to having a tiger pen next to a highway, from assisting a homicidal maniac to escape to placing a mutilated corpse on a doorstep, and from selling rotten meat to "subdividing houses to the point where they become 'overpestered' with the poor". As these examples demonstrate, early authority to commence public nuisance actions was derived from the sovereign's "police power".

Spencer (1989 at 59) describes the offence as "a rag-bag of odds and ends which we should nowadays call 'public welfare offences'". But the common feature of the crime is that members of the public suffer a common injury through interference with rights which they enjoy as citizens. The modern definition is found in paras 31–40 Archbold (2005):

A person is guilty of a public nuisance (also known as common nuisance), who (a) does an act not warranted by law, or (b) omits to discharge a legal duty, if the effect of the act or omission is to endanger the life, health, property, morals, or comfort of the public, or to obstruct the public in the exercise or enjoyment of rights common to all Her Majesty's subjects.

In Attorney General v PYA Quarries Ltd the issue was whether quarrying activities—which showered the neighbourhood with stones and splinters, and caused dust and vibrations—were a private nuisance affecting some of the residents (which would have been civil), but not a public nuisance affecting all Her Majesty's liege subjects living in the area. In his judgment Romer LJ concluded at p 184:

I do not propose to attempt a more precise definition of a public nuisance than those which emerge from the textbooks and authorities to which I have referred. It is, however, clear, in my opinion, that any nuisance is 'public' which materially affects the reasonable comfort and convenience of life of a class of Her Majesty's subjects. The sphere of the nuisance may be described generally as 'the neighbourhood'; but the question whether the local community within that sphere comprises a sufficient number of persons to constitute a class of the public is a question of fact in every case. It is not necessary, in my judgment, to prove that every member of the class has been injuriously affected; it is sufficient to show that a representative cross-section of the class has been so affected for an injunction to issue.

Denning LJ agreed, at p. 191,

that a public nuisance is a nuisance which is so widespread in its range or so indiscriminate in its effect that it would not be reasonable to expect one person to take proceedings on his own responsibility to put a stop to it, but that it should be taken on the responsibility of the community at large.

In R v Madden (1975) 1 WLR 1379 the defendant telephoned a bomb hoax to a steel works whose business was disrupted for about an hour. James LJ accepted that hoax telephone calls falsely asserting the presence of explosives could amount to an offence of public nuisance but the few employees whose day was disrupted were not a sufficiently wide class of the public. But in R v Norbury (1978) Crim LR 435 the defendant made 605 obscene telephone calls to 494 different women over a period of four years. This repetitive behaviour over a long period, intended to cause offence and alarm, was held the kind of behaviour which the public has an interest in condemning. This is not without its problems because each telephone call lacks the element of common injury. As a comparison, the cases of R v Ruffell (1991) 13 Cr App R (S) 204 and R v Shorrock (1994) QB 279 involved the prosecution of the organisers of "acid house" parties at night in fields adjacent to residential accommodation with liability confirmed because they knew, or ought to have known, that there was a real risk of creating the sort of nuisance that in fact occurred. At each party there was major traffic disruption and the noise of music, with clean-up operations required the following day. While R v Ong (2001) 1 Cr App R (S) 404 involved a betting scam in which the floodlights at a Premier Division football match between Charlton Athletic and Liverpool were to be sabotaged which was inherently dangerous to the thousands within the ground.

In R v Soul (1980) 70 Cr App R 295 a group who agreed to secure the unlawful release of a restricted Broadmoor patient was convicted of conspiracy to effect a public nuisance. The court seems to have assumed that the public would have been exposed to danger had the plan been put into effect. That the Crown had failed to prove any actual danger or common injury was not considered (see the critical commentary at (1980) Crim. LR 234 suggesting that the courts were improperly reintroducing "public mischief" into the law despite the ruling by the House of Lords in R v Withers (1975) AC 842). Similarly, in R v Millward (1986) 8 Cr. App R(S) 209 the defendant made hundreds of telephone calls (636 in a single day) to a young woman police officer with whom he had become infatuated, at the police station where she worked. As to the requirement of common injury, Glidewell LJ said:

Quite apart from anything else, this disrupts the whole operation of the police station to which these calls are directed, because a member of the public may wish to report an urgent matter such as a criminal offence, and cannot do so or is delayed in doing so because of this kind of behaviour on the part of the appellant.

In R v Johnson (Anthony) (1997) 1 WLR 367, the Court of Appeal confronted the problem head-on. The defendant had made hundreds of obscene telephone calls to at least thirteen women. The defence argued each telephone call was a single isolated act to an individual. Tucker J rejected the argument at pp. 370–371:

In our judgment it is permissible and necessary to look at the cumulative effect of these calls, made to numerous ladies on numerous occasions in the case of each lady, and to have regard to the cumulative effect of the calls in determining whether the appellant's conduct constituted a public nuisance. In our opinion it was conduct which materially affected the reasonable comfort and convenience of a class of Her Majesty's subjects: see per Romer LJ in Attorney-General v PYA Quarries Ltd. It was a nuisance which was so widespread in its range, or so indiscriminate in its effect, that it would not be reasonable to expect one person to take proceedings on her own responsibility, but that they should be taken on the responsibility of the community at large: see Denning LJ ... It was proved by the Crown that the public, meaning a considerable number of persons or a section of the public, was affected, as distinct from individual persons.

This was followed in a number of cases such as R v Holliday and Leboutillier (2004) EWCA Crim 1847 in which two animal liberation activists made a large number of telephone calls to employees and shareholders of certain companies whose activities the appellants opposed. The calls were designed to jam the company telephone switchboards, and some of them were threatening and intimidating.

The common law offence of public nuisance was abolished in England and Wales by s. 78 of the Police, Crime, Sentencing and Courts Act 2022. It remains an offence under the common law of Northern Ireland.

== The law reviewed ==
In R v Goldstein and Rimmington (2005) UKHL 63 two separate appeal cases were considered together. The Lords began their judgment with a detailed review of the law and its history. Two arguments were raised by the defence. The first was that most of the factual situations that might otherwise have been criminal public nuisances had now been covered by statutes. Thus, for example, s. 1 Protection from Harassment Act 1997 would now be used in cases involving multiple telephone calls, and s. 63 Criminal Justice and Public Order Act 1994 confers powers on the police to remove persons attending or preparing for a rave "at which amplified music is played during the night (with or without intermissions) and is such as, by reason of its loudness and duration and the time at which it is played, is likely to cause serious distress to the inhabitants of the locality". These statutes had, in effect, made the common law offence redundant and it should no longer be considered an offence in English law. The Lords agreed that, as a matter of practice, all alleged offences falling within the remit of statutes would now be charged under those statutes. It also accepted that this left only a very small scope for the application of the common law offence. But, just as the courts had no power to create new offences (R v Withers), and could not widen existing offences so as to retrospectively criminalise conduct (R v Misra and Srivastava (2004) EWCA Crim 2375), it equally had no power to abolish existing offences. However, cases such as R v Norbury and R v Johnson (Anthony) would now be charged under the relevant statutes.

The second argument raised by the defence was that the law lacked the certainty required to be valid under Article 7 of the European Convention on Human Rights.

No punishment without law

1. No one shall be held guilty of any criminal offence on account of any act or omission which did not constitute a criminal offence under national or international law at the time when it was committed. Nor shall a heavier penalty be imposed than the one that was applicable at the time the criminal offence was committed.

Of all the common law offences considered at Strasbourg, only the criterion of "contra bonos mores" had been held to lack the appropriate quality of certainty (see Hashman and Harrup v United Kingdom (1999) 30 EHRR 241). The Lords therefore held that, as defined in Archbold, the offence did have sufficient certainty so that any legal practitioner asked to advise on whether proposed conduct was likely to be criminal would be able to give an accurate answer.

=== Goldstein's appeal ===
As a cultural reference, Goldstein sent an envelope to a friend of his containing a small quantity of salt. Some of this salt escaped from the envelope at a postal sorting office, which was closed as a precaution so that tests could be carried out to determine whether the material spilt was dangerous. The Lords accepted that a significant number of people were disadvantaged by the closure of the sorting office and the loss of delivery on that day, but held that the appellant did not have the appropriate mens rea because he did not know or reasonably should have known (because the means of knowledge were available to him) that the salt would escape in the sorting office or in the course of postal delivery.

== See also ==
- Disturbing the peace
- Noise pollution
- Wasting police time
