= Obscene Publications Act 1959 =

Act of the Parliament of the United Kingdom

Obscene Publications Act 1959 (Note: Section 5(1).)
- Act of Parliament
- Parliament of the United Kingdom
- Long title: An Act to amend the law relating to the publication of obscene matter; to provide for the protection of literature; and to strengthen the law concerning pornography.
- Citation: 7 & 8 Eliz. 2. c. 66
- Introduced by: Roy Jenkins (Commons)
- Territorial extent: England and Wales (Note: Section 5(3).)

Dates
- Royal assent: 29 July 1959
- Commencement: 29 August 1959 (Note: Section 5(2).)
Other legislation
Repeals/revokes	Obscene Publications Act 1857
Amended by	Obscene Publications Act 1964; Courts Act 1971; Criminal Law Act 1977; Police and Criminal Evidence Act 1984; Broadcasting Act 1990; Criminal Justice and Public Order Act 1994; Licensing Act 2003; Courts Act 2003; Criminal Justice and Immigration Act 2008; Online Safety Act 2023

Status: Amended

Text of statute as originally enacted

Text of the Obscene Publications Act 1959 as in force today (including any amendments) within the United Kingdom, from legislation.gov.uk.

The Obscene Publications Act 1959 (7 & 8 Eliz. 2. c. 66) is an act of the Parliament of the United Kingdom, which significantly reformed the law related to obscenity in England and Wales. Before the passage of the act, the law on publishing obscene materials was governed by the common-law case of R v Hicklin, which had no exceptions for artistic merit or the public good. During the 1950s, the Society of Authors formed a committee to recommend reform of the existing law, submitting a draft bill to the Home Office in February 1955. After several failed attempts to push a bill through Parliament, a committee wrote a viable bill, which was introduced to Parliament by Roy Jenkins and given royal assent on 29 July 1959, coming into force on 29 August 1959 as the Obscene Publications Act 1959. With the committee consisting of both censors and reformers, the actual reform of the law was limited, with several extensions of police powers included in the final version.

The act created a new offence, that of publishing obscene material, and abolished the common-law offence of publishing obscene materials, which had been previously used. The act also allows Justices of the Peace to issue warrants for the police seizure of such materials. It also creates two defences, those of innocent dissemination and of the public good. The act has been used in several high-profile cases, such as the trials of Penguin Books for publishing Lady Chatterley's Lover and Oz for the Schoolkids OZ issue.

== Background and passage ==
=== Before 1959: The Early History of Obscenity Regulation ===
Obscene publications were, historically, something for the canon law; the first prosecution in a court of common law was in 1727. Before the passing of the 1959 act, the publication of obscene materials in England and Wales was governed by the common law and the Obscene Publications Act 1857 (20 & 21 Vict. c. 83). The common law, as established in R v Hicklin [1868] 3 QB 360, set the test of "obscenity" as "whether the tendency of the letter published is to deprave and corrupt those whose minds are open to such immoral influence and into whose hands the publication might fall"; the 1857 Act allowed any stipendiary magistrate or any two Justices of the Peace to issue a warrant authorising the police to search for, seize, and destroy any obscene publications.

It was generally accepted that the existing law was heavily flawed, for several reasons. One was that the "Hicklin test", from R v Hicklin, was both unduly narrow and unyielding; it did not, for example, take into account the intentions of the defendant. Another was that the test meant that individual sections of a published work could be analysed and the entire work declared obscene, even if the rest of the work was fairly mild. Third, there was no defence based on the public good, and no opportunity to submit evidence showing the artistic merits of the work. Finally, a work could be destroyed without the author's or the publisher's being informed and given an opportunity to defend the work.

=== 1959: The Enactment of the Obscene Publications Act 1959 ===
In the 1950s, efforts started to attempt reform of the law. After the prosecution of several notable publishers, the Society of Authors formed a committee (with Norman St John-Stevas as legal advisor) to recommend reform of the existing law, submitting their proposals and a draft bill to the Home Office in February 1955. Instead of the wholesale reform that the Society hoped for, the government chose limited reform through the Children and Young Persons (Harmful Publications) Act 1955, dealing with horror comics, which kept the Hicklin test but required that the work as a whole be examined. The Society and sympathetic Members of Parliament then attempted to introduce a Private Member's Bill, but this was quashed by the ensuing general election. Another Private Member's Bill was introduced, successfully, in March 1957 and sent to a committee. Comprising censors and reformers, the committee made mixed recommendations, both conservative (further powers of search and seizure for the police) and liberal (the use of expert evidence attesting to the work's artistic merit).

The committee's proposals were published in March 1958, and a new bill was introduced under the Ten Minute Rule, failing to gain the requisite support. After A. P. Herbert stood for Parliament on a platform of obscenity reform, the Home Office had a change of heart and introduced a new bill through Roy Jenkins in 1959, a compromise between the aims of the campaigners and the goals of the Home Office. It was introduced to the House of Lords by Lord Birkett, received royal assent on 29 July 1959, and came into force on 29 August 1959 as the Obscene Publications Act 1959.

Similar laws were also introduced in other countries. As early as 1942, Switzerland passed its first nationwide criminal code, which contained provisions against so-called “obscene literature.” In West Germany, a corresponding law followed in 1953 after long and controversial debates. Similar to Austria with its Pornography Act, political support came primarily from conservative circles and the Catholic Church, which saw the law as a means of combating the supposed moral decline after the Nazi era. However, the resurgent interest in obscenity regulations was not a purely German-speaking phenomenon, as France passed a law in 1949 to control youth-related publications.

== Provisions ==
The act is relatively short, divided into 5 sections, the fifth covering the extent of the act and its commencement date.

Section 1: Test of obscenity
It covers the test to determine if something is obscene; an article is taken to be obscene if the entire article "is, if taken as a whole, such as to tend to deprave and corrupt persons who are likely, having regard to all relevant circumstances, to read, see or hear the matter contained or embodied in it". The test is based on "persons"; DPP v Whyte [1972] AC 849 established that it was not sufficient for an individual to be depraved or corrupted, it must be that a significant number of people likely to read it would become corrupt. "Article" is defined within Section 1 as anything containing material that is read or looked at, any sound recordings and any film or other picture record. A publisher, as used in the act, is also defined in Section 1; "publisher" is taken to mean anyone who "distributes, circulates, sells, lets on hire, gives, or lends it, or who offers it for sale or for letting on hire", or "in the case of an article containing or embodying matter to be looked at or a record, shows, plays or projects it". The Criminal Justice and Public Order Act 1994 amended this section to include the transmission of the article electronically.

Section 2: Prohibition of publication of obscene matter
Covers the actual prohibition of publishing "obscene material". Section 2(1) creates a new offence, "publishing an obscene article", which replaces the common law misdemeanour of "obscene libel" which was previously the crime. Somebody can be found guilty of this regardless of if it was done for profit or not. Where the article is a film, the consent of the Director of Public Prosecutions is required before a prosecution can commence. Section 2(4) states that, where an article is obscene, no other common law charges should be brought, and it should instead be dealt with through the 1959 act, intended to limit prosecutions to those crimes found in this Act. Section 2(5) creates a defence of "innocent dissemination"; if the publisher can prove that they did not anticipate any obscenity problems, and did not examine the article in question for such issues, they cannot be convicted.

Section 3: Powers of search and seizure
Covers Powers of search and seizure, which also repealed the Obscene Publications Act 1857. This section allows a Justice of the Peace, if satisfied that there are reasonable grounds to believe obscene publications are kept on certain premises for profit, to issue a warrant for that location. This warrant allows a police officer to enter the premises, search them and remove any suspect publications; if such publications are found, the officer can also take records relating to the businesses trade. The articles must then be brought before a magistrate and either forfeited by the owners or returned. The owner, author or publisher of the articles, or the person from whom they were seized, may appear before the magistrate to argue why they should not be forfeited.

Section 4: Defence of public good
Creates the defence of public good, which applies both to prosecutions for publication of obscene materials and to the forfeiture proceedings described in Section 3. This allows for a valid defence if the defendant can show that the publication of the materials was justifiable as for the "public good", which is defined as "in the interests of science, literature, art or learning, or of other objects of general concern". Experts and their testimony are admissible for determining the value of such publications. This section was initially treated very strictly by trial judges, but this attitude was reversed after the 1976 trial of the book Inside Linda Lovelace, where the jury found the publishers not guilty despite the judge saying that "if this isn't obscene, members of the jury, you may think that nothing is obscene". Three years later the Williams Committee recommended that restrictions on written pornography be lifted, and these restrictions have been largely abandoned.

== Notable prosecutions under the act ==
=== Lady Chatterley's Lover trial ===
The first noted prosecution under the Obscene Publications Act was of Penguin Books in R v Penguin Books Ltd. [1960] for publishing Lady Chatterley's Lover. The book, which contained the use of the words "fuck" and "cunt" multiple times, along with sexual scenes, was banned completely in England and Wales until the conclusion of the trial; by the mid-1980s, it was on the school syllabus. Penguin Books relied on Section 4's "public good" defence, with academics and literary critics such as E. M. Forster and Helen Gardner testifying at the trial that the book was one of literary merit. The trial at the Old Bailey eventually ended with a not guilty verdict, allowing the book to be openly published and sold in England and Wales for the first time since it was published in 1928. This trial and its verdict is seen as heralding "a new wave of sexual 'morality' for which the 1960s is now famous". Graham Lord wrote that the case "was the first trumpet call of the permissive society, the moment many believe that British morality, manners and family life began seriously to deteriorate".

=== Stass Paraskos trial ===
In 1966 an exhibition at Leeds College of Art of paintings by the Cyprus-born British artist Stass Paraskos, entitled Lovers and Romances, was prosecuted by the City of Leeds police and the Director of Public Prosecutions under the Vagrancy Acts of 1828 and 1837, and the Obscene Publications Act 1959. When the exhibition opened it was allegedly visited by a local school group, the leader of which objected to an image depicting a woman performing manual sex on a man. The exhibition was raided by the police and closed down. Despite luminaries of the art world speaking in Paraskos's defence, including Herbert Read and Norbert Lynton, and a message of support from Britain's Home Secretary Roy Jenkins, Paraskos lost the trial and was fined twenty-five pounds. The case was later cited in the report of a working party convened in 1968, under the chairpersonship of John Montgomerie, by the Arts Council of Great Britain, to review the obscenity laws in England and Wales. In this report it was suggested the artist should not have been prosecuted in this case, even if the works of art were deemed obscene, as he was not the publisher as defined by the Obscene Publications Act.

=== Schoolkids Oz trial ===
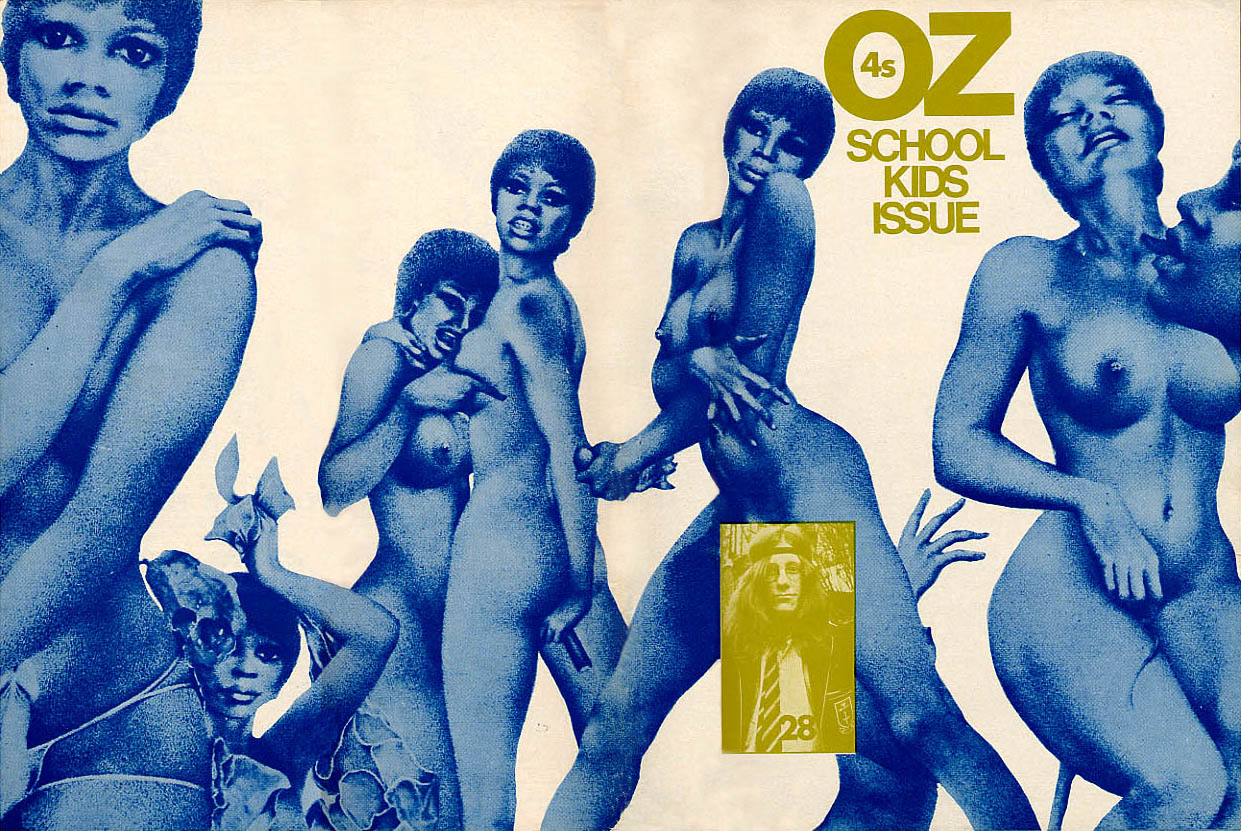
Schoolkids Oz, which prompted the Oz obscenity trial

In 1971 the editors of Oz were tried for publishing obscene materials, specifically the Schoolkids Oz issue. Oz was an underground magazine with a circulation of 40,000 which aimed to challenge the "older generation's outdated beliefs and standards of behaviour and morality". For its 28th issue, 20 teenagers were invited to contribute and edit it. The published version was 48 pages long, with the front consisting of a sheet from the French erotic book Desseins Erotiques, which depicted four naked women performing sex acts. Inside were articles about homosexuality, sadism, and a cartoon strip of Rupert Bear "ravaging" a "gipsy granny". John Mortimer acted for the defence, and after the longest obscenity trial in English legal history the defendants were convicted. After a three-day hearing in the Court of Appeal of England and Wales, this conviction was overturned; the Court of Appeal recognised 14 errors of law and a large number of errors of fact in the trial judge's summing up to the jury.

=== Later cases ===
Later cases have included:

- 1976: the Inside Linda Lovelace obscenity trial (found not guilty)
- 1991: David Britton's Lord Horror prosecution (not prosecuted - banned under the act, but later overturned)
- 2009: R v Walker where Darryn Walker was found not guilty under the Obscene Publications Act for posting a story entitled "Girls (Scream) Aloud", a fictional written account on an internet erotic story site describing the kidnap, rape and murder of pop group Girls Aloud.
- 2010: Gavin Smith who was charged after discussing his fantasies about spanking children. After the Crown Prosecution Service appealed the judge's original ruling that there was no case to answer, he was subsequently convicted in 2012.
- 2011: The British Board of Film Classification refused to classify an uncut version of Tom Six's The Human Centipede 2 (Full Sequence), considering it "potentially obscene".
- 2012: R v Peacock where a man was unsuccessfully prosecuted for selling DVDs featuring BDSM, fisting and urolagnia.

== Impact and assessment ==
The act was found deficient in a variety of ways. Firstly, the test meant that "sting" operations where the police purchased "obscene" materials were not considered sufficient evidence of publication, since the police were not considered easy to "corrupt" due to their regular exposure to the materials. It also meant that prosecutors often had to prove that purchasers were unaware of the obscene nature of material on sale prior to purchase, as those who actively sought out such material were deemed unlikely to be corrupted by it. Secondly, the offer of such materials for sale was not held to be publication, since it was merely an invitation to buy, not an actual purchase. Thirdly, the courts held in Straker v DPP [1963] 1 QB 926 that negatives for photographs could not be forfeited if it was not intended to publish them, regardless of their obscene nature. As a result, the act was amended by the Obscene Publications Act 1964, which created the offence of "possessing obscene articles for publication or sale" and also extended "obscene materials" to cover photographic negatives. Another criticism levelled at both Acts was that they failed to define "obscene" properly, relying on the old common law definition and giving no help to the judge or jury as to how to apply it properly. Some anti-pornography feminists are of the opinion that the act fails to adequately censor content as a result of this lack of clarity. The National Campaign for the Repeal of the Obscene Publications Acts (NCROPA) was set up in 1976 by the actor David Webb; it operated until the late 1990s.

=== 21st century ===
By the early 21st century it had become evident that there was a disparity between what was deemed to be offensive under the act and what would be regarded as offensive by a significant proportion of the general public. This may have been due to the age of the law or an indication that the UK had become a diverse and multicultural society. In 1996 there were 562 cases brought, in which 324 individuals were convicted. Even with this small number of trials, a third of convictions resulted in prison sentences, and only a small number of cases went to jury trials. The number of prosecutions fell from 309 in 1994, 131 in 1999, 39 in 2003 to 35 in 2005. This decline may have been partly due to the changing behaviour of jurors, who had become less likely to consider material as depraving and corrupting, and who were reluctant to convict defendants for the private use of material amongst consenting adults. Another reason for the decline may have been the range of alternative legislation which had become available for use in place of the act. Suggestions given by the Crown Prosecution Service included:

- Section 63 of the Criminal Justice and Immigration Act 2008 ("extreme pornography")
- Protection of Children Act 1978
- Video Recordings Act 1984 and 2010
- Indecent Displays (Control) Act 1981
- Customs Consolidation Act 1876, Amendment Act 1887 (Importation of Indecent and Obscene Material)
- Children and Young Persons (Harmful Publications) Act 1955.

Nevertheless the act continued to have a significant impact in English law for many years, with its precedents serving to provide a definition of obscenity that were used in other legal contexts. For instance, anything deemed likely to contravene the act was prohibited from videos awarded an R18 certificate by the British Board of Film Classification, and the Audiovisual Media Services Regulations 2014 extended these restrictions to online video on demand. A list of the categories of material most commonly prosecuted under the act was published by the Crown Prosecution Service.

However, following a public consultation, the Crown Prosecution Service published guidelines in 2019 indicating that pornography depicting consenting adults engaged in legal acts would no longer be prosecuted under the act, provided no serious harm was caused and the likely audience was over the age of 18. The guidelines also clarified that material that is purposefully obscene can be justified as in the public good if it is "in the interests of science, literature, art or learning".

== See also ==
- Obscenity
- Obscene Publications Act 1964
- Section 63 of the Criminal Justice and Immigration Act 2008
- Civic Government (Scotland) Act 1982
- Pornography in the United Kingdom

== Bibliography ==
- Barnett, Hilaire (1997). Sourcebook on feminist jurisprudence. Routledge. ISBN 1-85941-113-4.
- Beale, Andrew (1997). Essential Constitutional Law (2nd ed.). Routledge. ISBN 1-85941-146-0.
- Dabydeen, S.R. (2004). Civil Liberties in England and Wales. iUniverse. ISBN 0-595-77219-6.
- Edwards, Susan (1998). "On the contemporary application of the Obscene Publications Act 1959". Criminal Law Review. Sweet & Maxwell. ISSN 0011-135X.
- Europe, Council of (1976). Yearbook of the European Convention on Human Rights/annuaire De La Convention Europeenne Des Droits De L'homme1974, Volume 17. Martinus Nijhoff Publishers. ISBN 90-247-1838-4.
- Harris, Phil (2006). An introduction to law (7th ed.). Cambridge University Press. ISBN 0-521-69796-4.
- Glazebrook, Peter (2007). Blackstone's Statutes on Criminal Law 2007-2008 (17th ed.). Oxford University Press. ISBN 978-0-19-921166-1.
- Lord, Graham (2005). John Mortimer: The Devil's Advocate. Orion. ISBN 0-7528-7780-1.
- Rana, Inder S. (1990). Law of obscenity in India, USA & UK. Mittal Publications. ISBN 81-7099-169-2.
- Rozenberg, Joshua (1987). The Case for the Crown: the Inside Story of the Director of Public Prosecutions. Equation Publishing. ISBN 1-85336-011-2.
- Stone, Richard (1989). Entry, search and seizure: a guide to civil and criminal powers of entry (2nd ed.). Taylor & Francis. ISBN 0-421-38950-8.
- Torremans, Paul (2000). Legal convergence in the enlarged Europe of the new millennium. Martinus Nijhoff Publishers. ISBN 90-411-1337-1.
- Wade, E.C.S. (1959). "Obscene Publications Act, 1959". Cambridge Law Journal. 17 (2). Cambridge University Press: 179–182. doi:10.1017/S0008197300007595. ISSN 0008-1973. S2CID 143542043.
- Winer, Jon (1991). Come together: John Lennon in his time. University of Illinois Press. ISBN 0-252-06131-4.
- Williams, D.G.T. (1972). "Oz and Obscenity". Cambridge Law Journal. 30 (1). Cambridge University Press: 15–17. doi:10.1017/S0008197300008539. ISSN 0008-1973. S2CID 145131336.
- Williams, J.E. Hall (1960). "The Obscene Publications Act, 1959". The Modern Law Review. 23 (3). Blackwell Publishing. ISSN 0026-7961.
- Williams, J.E. Hall (1965). "Obscene Publications Act, 1964". The Modern Law Review. 28 (1). Blackwell Publishing. ISSN 0026-7961.
