= Section 63 of the Criminal Justice and Immigration Act 2008 =

UK law concerning pornography

Section 63 of the Criminal Justice and Immigration Act 2008 is a law in the United Kingdom criminalising possession of what it refers to as "extreme pornographic images". The law came into force on 26 January 2009. The legislation was brought in following the murder of Jane Longhurst by a man who was said at the time of his trial to have had "extreme pornography" in his possession at the time of the death. The law has been more widely used than originally predicted, raising concerns as to whether the legislation is being used for prosecutions beyond the scope originally envisaged by parliament.

== The law ==
The law, part of the Criminal Justice and Immigration Act 2008, applies to pornography (defined as an image "of such a nature that it must reasonably be assumed to have been produced solely or principally for the purpose of sexual arousal") which is "grossly offensive, disgusting or otherwise of an obscene character" and portrays "in an explicit and realistic way" any of the following:

- An act threatening a person's life
- An act which results (or is likely to result) in serious injury to a person's anus, breasts or genitals
- An act which involves (or appears to involve) sexual interference with a human corpse
- A person performing (or appearing to perform) an act of intercourse (or oral sex) with a non-human animal (whether dead or alive),

and a reasonable person looking at the image would think that any such person (or animal) was real.

Additionally, the Criminal Justice and Courts Act 2015 amended section 63 to include:

- An act which involves the non-consensual penetration of a person's vagina, anus or mouth by another with the other person's penis, or
- An act which involves the non-consensual sexual penetration of a person's vagina or anus by another with a part of the other person's body or anything else

The term covers staged acts, and applies whether or not the participants consent. Films classified by the British Board of Film Classification are exempt, but an extract from a classified film (if the image was extracted for the purpose of sexual arousal) would not be exempt. Whether or not an image is "pornographic" is up to the magistrate (or jury) to determine by looking at the image. It is not a question of the intentions of those who produced the image.

If an image is held in a person's possession as part of a series of images, the question of whether it is pornographic is also determined by the context in which it appears. Therefore, an image might be legal in some contexts but not others. Serious injury is not defined by the act, but is up to the magistrate or jury. Guidance on the bill gives examples of activity which would be covered: depictions of hanging, suffocation, or sexual assault involving a threat with a weapon; the insertion of sharp objects into (or the mutilation of) breasts or genitals.

The definition of "obscene" is not the same as that used in the Obscene Publications Acts, which requires that an image "deprave and corrupt" those likely to view it; instead, this is the ordinary dictionary definition of "obscene". "Grossly offensive" and "disgusting" are given as examples of "obscene".

As was demonstrated by a court decision in 2014, so long as it can be demonstrated that the recipient stored the images then it is not necessary to prove that those in possession of offending images had solicited them. Thus it is possible to contravene the law as a result of receiving unsolicited images.

There is a defence if the defendant can prove that they "directly participated" in the act and the other participants also consented, but only if the acts are those which can be legally consented to in the UK. This defence is not available to the photographer or other "onlookers" who were present, but did not directly participate.

Where the first two clauses above apply, the maximum sentence is three years (36 months); otherwise, the maximum is two years (24 months). Adults sentenced to at least two years (24 months) will be placed on the Violent and Sex Offender Register for 10 years if the sentence is less than 30 months and Indefinite if the sentence is fixed period more than 30 months. A minor offence may result in just a fine.

In 2019 the laws concerning extreme pornography were relaxed. The depiction of fetishes such as BDSM and humiliation is no longer likely to be prosecuted, provided the production is consensual and no harm is caused thereby, and the depiction does not promote criminality and is not aimed at minors.

== History ==
After Graham Coutts' conviction in February 2004, the government and police forces called for "violent" adult pornography sites to be shut down and Jane Longhurst's mother and sister launched a campaign against such sites. A petition (which gained 50,000 signatures) promoted by MP Martin Salter was submitted to the government, demanding a ban of "extreme internet sites promoting violence against women in the name of sexual gratification". The government was unsuccessful in shutting down such sites, since they are based in other countries and are legally made with consenting adults. In August 2005, the British government instead consulted on criminalising the possession of such images.

On 30 August 2006, the government published the results of the consultation, and announced its intention to introduce a possession ban on all extreme pornography as soon as the legislative timetable allowed. Opinions on the proposals were sharply divided in the consultation, with 61 percent (241 out of 397) of responses rejecting the need for stronger laws in this area and 36 percent in favour (3 percent gave no opinion). The proposed maximum penalty for possession of these images was three years' imprisonment.

On 26 June 2007, the government published the plans as part of the Criminal Justice and Immigration Bill. The bill extended the scope of the proposals from "serious, disabling injury" to "serious injury". The law came into force on 26 January 2009. In July 2009, Baroness O'Cathain proposed an amendment to the Coroners and Justice Act which would bring in an equivalent law for "extreme pornographic writings".

There have been many more prosecutions under the law than the 30 cases a year originally predicted by ministers. In 2011–12, there were 1,337 prosecutions and in 2012–13 there were 1,348. By 2015, there were still more than 1,000 annual prosecutions. This has raised concerns that the legislation may be being used for prosecutions beyond the scope originally envisaged by parliament. Prosecutors are said to be unsure of the meaning of the law due to a lack of guidance explaining those categories that are difficult to define. The House of Lords was promised by the government just prior to the enactment of the legislation that such guidance would be issued, but this did not happen. The lack of clarity means that the law would apparently outlaw images which have been exhibited in art galleries, such as the material from Robert Mapplethorpe's X Portfolio, which was included in the Barbican Gallery's Seduced exhibition in 2008.

The possession of rape pornography in England and Wales was not criminalised by the legislation. However, the Criminal Justice and Courts Act 2015 amended the Act to include such a prohibition.

=== Notable uses ===
- A 20-year-old St Helens man was prosecuted on 10 February 2009 for having "extreme" images involving women and animals. The images were reported by a PC repair shop. He was given an 18-month supervision order, 24 hours at an attendance centre and had to pay costs of £65.
- In June 2009 The Register claimed that according to their sources in law enforcement, there have been two or three prosecutions against people selling Chinese bootlegged DVDs (which include some bestiality DVDs). A later case in 2010 also involved the use against someone selling unlicensed DVDs. In January 2011, a South African national living in Berkshire was sentenced to 12 months in prison, followed by deportation, for having downloaded 261 videos of people having sex with dogs, pigs, horses and donkeys. He also received additional concurrent sentences of two months and one month for four images of children which he had also downloaded, allegedly inadvertently.
- On 31 December 2009, a man was found not guilty under the law; he was cleared by a judge, after the prosecution offered no evidence against him. The film he was charged with possessing depicted a sexual act with a tiger, but it emerged that the tiger in the film was not real and the image was a joke. Police and prosecutors admitted that they had not watched the film with sound turned on. In March 2010, the same man pleaded guilty on a second charge for a six-second video clip involving humans, having been told by his legal aid defence team that this was his only chance to avoid prison. However, when a judge told him to prepare for a custodial sentence he changed his plea to not guilty, having taken advice from the pressure group Backlash. A new trial was arranged, but the prosecution chose to withdraw charges before it could begin. In 2014 a human rights impact assessment of the law by the Crown Prosecution Service was requested under the Human Rights Act 1998; it was argued that the legislation lacks adequately clear definitions, there is insufficient prosecution guidance from the DPP, and that the offence is disproportionate to the legislation's intended aims.
- The law has been used against people possessing only images of human adults (as opposed to the animal clauses), who have pleaded guilty.
- In February 2014 three police officers from the Diplomatic Protection Group were arrested on suspicion of sharing "extreme" pornographic images using mobile phones.
- In 2015 the footballer Adam Johnson was arrested on suspicion of possessing animal pornography. In investigations, police found animal pornography on Johnson's laptop; he was not tried for possession of these files.

=== 2011 test case ===
In January 2011, a man was tried before Stafford Crown Court for possession of staged images depicting a knife attack and a drowning in a bath. The prosecution said, "There is a need to regulate images portraying sexual violence, to safeguard the decency of society and for the protection of women". Expert witness for the defence Feona Attwood said the images were like stills from a 1970s Hammer horror film. The trial was a landmark, possibly the first such case tested by a jury. It was also notable as a case where the defendant admitted that he intentionally downloaded and retained the images in question (as opposed to, for example, accidental downloading). On 6 January, the jury took 90 minutes to return a unanimous verdict of not guilty. The judge told them afterwards that this trial had been a test case; the legislation in question was still being interpreted.

=== 2012 test case ===
In August 2012, Simon Walsh, a former aide to then-mayor of London Boris Johnson, was charged with possessing five images of "extreme pornography", which were not found by police on his computers, but as email attachments on a Hotmail server account. He was found not guilty on all counts. Three images were of urethral sounding, and two of anal fisting. The images were all of consensual adult sexual activity. The Crown Prosecution Service maintains that the acts depicted were "extreme" even if the jury disagreed in this case.

=== Scotland ===
In 2004 a committee of members of the Scottish Parliament (MSPs) backed a law to ban adult pornography, as the Equal Opportunities Committee supported a petition claiming links between pornography and sexual crimes and violence against women and children. A spokeswoman said, "While we have no plans to legislate we will, of course, continue to monitor the situation." In 2007, MSPs looked again at criminalising adult pornography in response to a call from Scottish Women Against Pornography for pornography to be classified as a hate crime against women. This was opposed by Feminists Against Censorship.

In September 2008, Scotland announced its own plans to criminalise possession of "extreme" pornography—extending the law further, including depictions of rape imagery and other non-consensual penetrative sexual activity (whether or not the participants actually consented). The new law is included in Section 42 of the Criminal Justice and Licensing (Scotland) Act 2010, and covers images which realistically depict:

- An act which takes (or threatens) a person's life
- An act which results (or is likely to result) in a person's severe injury
- Rape or other non-consensual penetrative sexual activity
- Sexual activity involving (directly or indirectly) a human corpse
- An act which involves sexual activity between a person and an animal (or an animal carcass)

Again, the law covers images of staged acts so long as a reasonable person looking at the image would think it was real or shows harm, and applies whether or not the participants consented.

== Arguments ==
The government consultation stated that "the material may often cause serious physical and other harm to those involved in making it; in some cases the participants are clearly the victims of criminal offences". The consultation did not attempt to estimate the frequency of these events, and there is no evidence that such content is being distributed at all. The law would cover images (whether or not the participants consented), and would include not only images where extreme violence is taking place but also fictitious images (where people are role-playing such violence).

Material is considered extreme pornography only if the main purpose of creating it was to produce sexual arousal. This rules out most mainstream films, documentaries, war footage or instructional videos (regardless of content), although these would be included if images were extracted from them for the purpose of sexual arousal. Textual material or cartoon depictions are also excluded, regardless of theme or detail.

The consultation stated "it is possible that such material may encourage or reinforce interest in violent and aberrant sexual activity to the detriment of society as a whole", but that they do not have "sufficient evidence from which to draw any definite conclusions as to the likely long term impact of this kind of material"; there was an "absence of conclusive research results as to its possible negative effects".

The consultation cited the case of Graham Coutts (who killed Jane Longhurst), suggesting a link between violent pornography and the murder. Coutts had previously accessed websites that offered such pornography (although he had been practicing erotic asphyxia for five years before exposure to such material), and had told psychiatrists in 1991 that he feared his thoughts might lead to criminal behaviour.

The government also wished to criminalise possession of the material, to reduce the risk of children coming into contact with it. The consultation cited a study which reported that "57% of all 9–19-year olds surveyed who use the Internet at least once a week had come into contact with pornography online", but did not distinguish among forms of pornography; the government had no plans to criminalize all pornography for the same reason.

In discussing the 2006 quashing of Coutts' conviction (Jane Longhurst's purported killer), a barrister supporting the Backlash stance observed:

Lord Hutton's judgement points out that Coutts had engaged in breath play sexual games with previous partners years before he started to use internet porn. The Judge commented that if the same Defendant guilty of the same conduct been tried before the same jury, but without the evidence that he used internet porn, the jury would have been very likely to accept that he did not intend to kill. It is hard to escape the conclusion that the Judge thought the evidence that Coutts used porn prejudiced the jury and led to unfounded assumptions about Coutt's intent. What this judgement shows is that the obsession with criminalising the users of porn will further prejudice juries and lead to miscarriages of justice.

In September 2007 the government published a Rapid Evidence Assessment by Catherine Itzin, Ann Taket and Liz Kelly, investigating "the evidence of harm relating to exposure to extreme pornographic material". This was criticised (in a statement signed by over 40 academics) as being "extremely poor, based on contested findings and accumulated results. It is one-sided and simply ignores the considerable research tradition into 'extreme' (be they violent or sexually explicit) materials within the UK's Humanities and Social Sciences".

The law has been criticised as probably breaching Articles 8 and 10 of the European Convention on Human Rights. The government acknowledged this, but believes "this is justified as being in accordance with the law, and necessary in a democratic society for the prevention of crime, for the protection of morals and for the protection of the rights and freedoms of others".

The Government has conflated the issue with participants being abused in the production of such images, with Martin Salter claiming the existence of snuff films where women are raped and murdered on camera in Guatemala. However, no such examples of images have been shown to exist, and the sites referred to by the government are instead those produced in the UK and US with consenting actors (see "Sites labelled as 'extreme pornography'", below).

The law has been criticised for criminalising images where no crime took place in their creation. In the House of Lords debates Lord Wallace of Tankerness stated, "Having engaged in it consensually would not be a crime, but to have a photograph of it in one's possession would be a crime. That does not seem to me to make sense". The law has also been criticised for covering images of consenting adults—for example, including some forms of BDSM or bondage pornography.

In 2009 the organisation Comic Shop Voice said that the law may result in the banning of certain comic books, such as Watchmen, Batman: The Killing Joke and several collections of manga. They said in a statement: "Because this is a minefield for the law it then falls on the Police to enforce it, and it is their judgement that could lead to a prosecution. We COULD get to a point where the police could legitimately visit your home or workplace, and sanctioned by an un-elected magistrate or judge go through your collection and if they find any comic book that they feel will cause sexual arousal or displays extreme violence then they could arrest you."

In 2010 a group of King's College London students produced a film, Hanging Perverts, debating the perils and moral issues behind the law. It includes interviews with several public and political figures, such as Baroness Sue Miller of the Liberal Democrats, bondage photographer Ben Westwood (son of Vivienne Westwood), and people working in the industry (such as hardcore BDSM pornographic actress Masie Dee).

== Sites labelled as "extreme pornography" ==
In 2004, following Graham Coutts' murder conviction, an Early Day Motion listed websites: Necrobabes, Death by Asphyxia, and Hanging Bitches (frequented by Coutts) as examples of sites promoting necrophilia, "likely to incite people to do harm to others."

=== Necrobabes ===
Necrobabes was a website hosting images of women pretending to be dead. The site was subtitled "erotic horror for adults". Necrobabes was included as an example of a site which relatives of Jane Longhurst (who was murdered by Graham Coutts) thought should be banned.

Membership in Necrobabes was used as evidence in the murder trial of Patrick Anthony Russo (a musical director at a Texas church), who murdered Diane Holik in 2001. During the subsequent police investigation, it was found out that Russo had been a paying subscriber to Necrobabes. Partly because of his Necrobabes membership and other evidence found from his computer (including his browser history and web searches for "asphyx"), Russo was found guilty of strangling Holik and given a life sentence.

The site owners asserted, "The material we produce is fanciful, even cartoonish in many regards; there is nothing realistic about it. Our viewers know this. Far from normalising violence, it relegates it squarely into the realm of fantasy." It stated that scenes were simulated, and no one was harmed during the making of their photo stories and videos. It claimed that contrary to the aforementioned petition, it "do[es] not encourage nor condone real-life violence against others". It stated that there was no pornography on the site, and claimed that it was exempt from the record-keeping requirements of 18 U.S.C. § 2257 because there were no images of actual, sexually-explicit conduct.

The site was registered with the ICRA, so it could be blocked by Microsoft Internet Explorer's parental controls. As of December 2009, the site was unavailable.

==== Coverage ====
The Early Day Motion referred to Necrobabes as "corrupting". The Guardian suggested that the worst still from Hitchcock's Frenzy "is easily the equal of any Necrobabes gore". The site has been covered in US media, which agree that the site is fantasy with consenting models.

==== Legality ====
Necrobabes was hosted in the United States and was online since 1997. The UK Government attempted (without success) to get US authorities to shut down such sites. Such images are legal in the US, and it has been claimed they would be difficult to ban without violating the First Amendment.

=== Hanging Bitches ===
Hangingbitches.com was a website run by Frans van der Hulst. The site was shut down, but van der Hulst has since opened more sites. The images are produced in the United Kingdom with British models who have been shown alive and unharmed.

== Organisations ==
Backlash launched a campaign in 2005 to challenge the joint UK Home Office and Scottish Government's proposals to criminalize simple possession of material. The Consenting Adult Action Network is a grass-roots network which opposes the law, and has organised protests against the law.

== See also ==
- Anti-pornography movement
- Audiovisual Media Services Regulations 2014
- Censorship in the United Kingdom
- Operation Spanner
- Pornography in the United Kingdom
- Right to pornography
- R v Walker – UK obscenity trial
