= List of adult television channels =

This is a list of adult channels that feature adult content, in the sense of erotica or pornography.

== List of adult channels ==
- Allure Channel – Thailand
- Brazzers TV – US (formerly Fresh! & Spice), New Zealand (formerly Spice:Xcess)
- Rush Stories – Thailand
- Sexy Hot – Brazil
- Dorcel TV – France/Netherlands
- Dusk! – Netherlands
- Hustler TV (Europe) – Netherlands
- Hustler HD 3D – Italy
- Leo TV – Czech Republic
- Brazzers TV Europe – UK
- Penthouse HD – UK
- Pink TV – France
- SmileTV – UK
- Spice Channel – UK
- Television X – UK
- Vivid TV Europe – Europe
- XMO – Netherlands
- XXL – France

=== North America ===
- AOV Adult Movie Channel – Canada
- Arouse – North America
- BangU. – US (formerly SKiN TV, Shorteez & Spice 2)
- Dorcel TV Canada – Canada
- Exxxtasy TV – Canada
- Hot Choice – US
- Hustler TV (US) – US
- Maleflixxx Television – Canada
- Mofos – US (formerly Xcess & Hot Zone)
- Playmen TV – Canada
- Penthouse TV (Canada) – Canada
- Penthouse TV – US
- Pink TV (US) – US
- Playboy TV – US
- Playmen TV – Canada
- Red Hot TV (Canada) – Canada
- RKTV – US (formerly ClubJenna & The Hot Network)
- Skinemax HD – Canada
- TEN Networks – US (Blox, Blue, Clips, Freaky, Juicy, Real, SexSee, TEN, VaVoom, XTSY)
- Vivid TV – US
- Vixen TV – Canada
- XXX Action Clips Channel – Canada
- Ullu - India
