= Europa 7 =

- Country: Italy
- Broadcast area: Italy

Programming
- Language: Italian

History
- Launched: 11 October 1987

Europa 7 was an Italian production centre of television channels owned by Francesco Di Stefano. Europa 7 produces and runs TV syndication nationwide in Italy.

== History ==
In 1997, Europa 7 attempted for the first time to broadcast nationwide. It was able to do so only in 2010, after having concluded a long legal battle against the Italian Government with an agreement between the two sides.

== Europa 7 HD ==
Europa 7 obtained a national multiplex (the slot corresponding to one channel in analog broadcasting and to many channels in digital broadcasting) in spring 2010, and decided to use it for transmitting in DVB-T2. Europa 7 HD was the name chosen to the offer of digital TV channels. Having a full multiplex for itself, Europa 7 HD hosts twelve alternating channels, of which eight in HD.

Europa 7 HD began testing broadcasts in July 2010, and started broadcasting from October 2010. Europa 7 HD transmits all of its channels in DVB-T2; it has been announced as "the first broadcaster in the world to broadcast with this new technology."

Its twelve alternating channels were:

- Fly channel, a free of charge generalist standard definition channel, with news, satire and culture
- Five HD thematic channels based on paid subscription: sentimental, horror, classic, action e family. These will offer movies, documentaries, concerts and international events
- Three pay-per-view HD channels offering movies most recently released on theaters.
- Three adult content channels, based on paid subscription and in standard definition. They will air from 23:30 until 6 am and with parental control.
