= Hustler TV =

Hustler TV may refer to

- Hustler TV (US), an American semi-hardcore pornographic pay-per-view television service
- Hustler TV Canada, a Canadian hardcore pornographic pay-TV service
- Hustler TV (Europe), a European hardcore pornographic pay-TV service

== See also ==
- Blue Hustler, a related European softcore erotic pay-TV service
- Hustler HD (also known as Hustler HD 3D), a related European 3DTV and HDTV hardcore erotic pay-TV service
- Hustler (disambiguation)
