= Anne-Marie Losique =

Canadian television producer

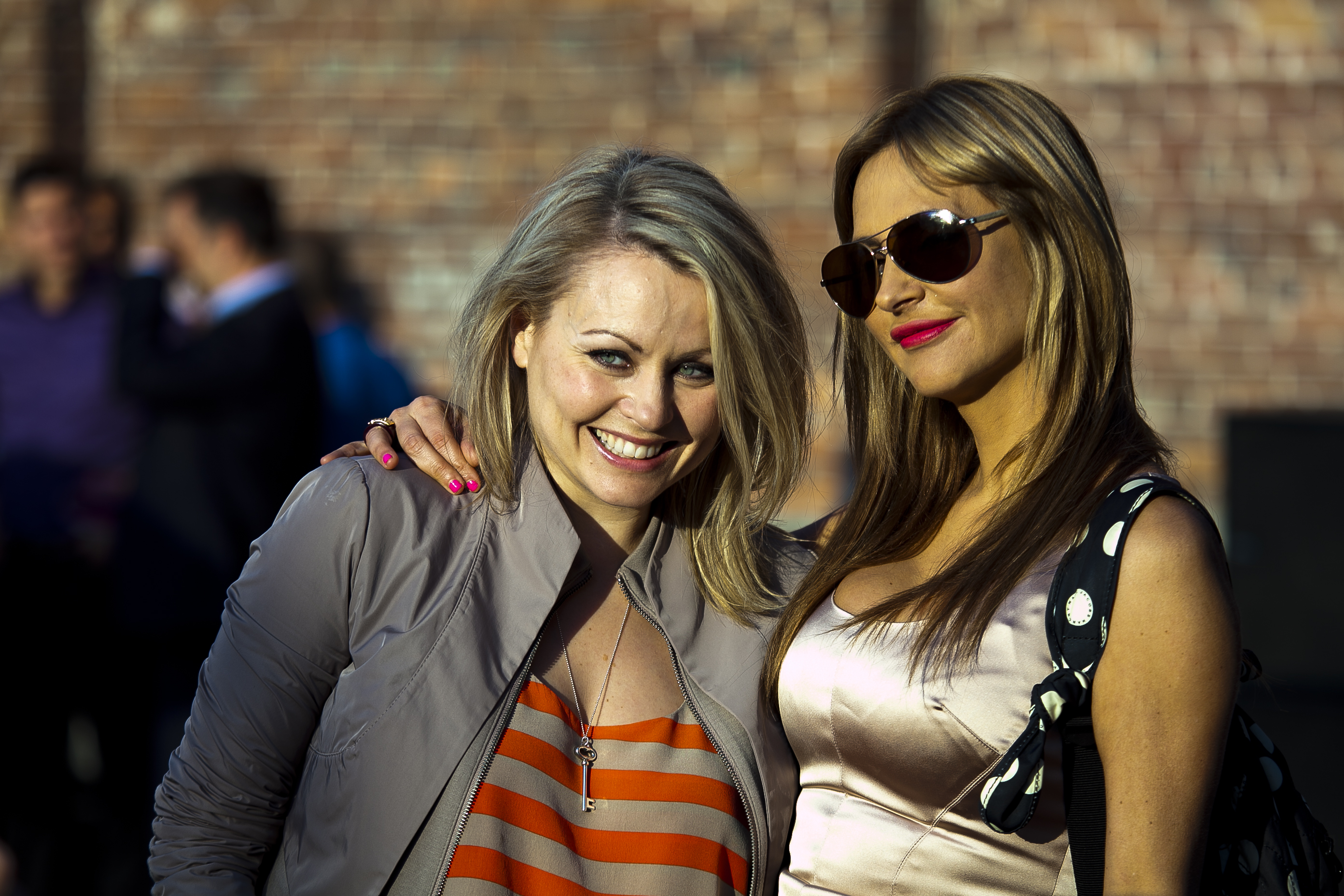
- Anne-Marie Losique (right) with Mitsou
- Occupations: Television producer; television host; singer
- Website: amlosique.com

Anne-Marie Losique (also known by the stage name AML) is a Canadian television producer, television host and singer. Together with Marc Trudeau she co-founded a production company, Image Diffusion International. She launched the Quebec adult entertainment television channel Vanessa TV, which broadcast from 2010 to 2014, after which it became Vivid TV Canada. Later ventures include Hustler TV Canada and Dorcel TV Canada, distributed by her company Vanessa Media.

== Early life and education ==
Losique is the daughter of Mimi (d. 2009) and Serge Losique, and is the youngest of three siblings. Her father Serge is founder of the Montreal World Film Festival. She has described herself as half Québécois and half Croatian. After studying at the Collège Jean-de-Brébeuf, a private school in Montreal, Quebec, she studied theatre at the Paris-Sorbonne University in France.

== Career ==
=== 1995–2009 ===
As host of the syndicated television programme, Box-office, starting in 1995, Losique held interviews with celebrities. Ben Affleck's appearances, in particular, became "legendary" among viewers, according to the Montreal Gazette. During this time, in 2001, she gained an interest in adult film production while recording for the programme at the Hot d'Or adult film festival in Cannes, France. It inspired her next venture, Sex Shop, which she hosted from 2001 to 2005, and during that time conducted interviews with celebrities such as Robin Williams and Penélope Cruz. According to Maclean's magazine, Sex Shop attracted almost half a million viewers (about six per cent of Quebec’s population) every Saturday night to watch a "mélange of interviews with men and women in the adult entertainment industry and the sex trade, faux-risqué documentaries on sex toys and swinger couples and scenes from soft-focus smut movies." She was also the last person to interview the iconic Italian actor Marcello Mastroianni.

With her then-boyfriend Marc Trudeau, Losique co-founded the production company, Image Diffusion International (IDI) in 1995. It produced at least 150 hours of television programming by 2004; this included the adult TV programme SeXstar, which featured interviews with people in the adult film industry. Her company produced the MusiMax reality show La vie rurale (The Rural Life), an adaptation of the U.S. programme The Simple Life, starring singer Jacynthe Millette-Bilodeau and herself. A mockumentary starring Losique, Bimbo, followed in 2006. For the 2009 television series Au Lit avec Anne-Marie, she held interviews with celebrities while sharing a bed with each of them. Other IDI productions include the talk show 3950 and Pole Position Québec, a 2010 reality show which searched for the best stripper in Quebec.

As a singer, she performed under the stage name AML.

=== 2010–present ===
IDI produced a 2010 documentary series, Le bum, les belles et la brute, on the lifestyle of Éric Grenier, a Quebecer who was described by La Presse as the province's Hugh Hefner. When asked by La Presse about Grenier's support for the Hells Angels biker gang and his connections to its members, Losique denied having knowledge about his background or connections before producing the series.

Losique appeared on the talk show Tout le monde en parle to promote her 2010 book, Confessions Sauvages, which contains photographs of her with others in the countryside. Accused of "reducing women to sexual objects to make money" in a letter to La Presse written by feminist Céline Duval, Losique criticized the remarks on an primetime live programme briefly after, explaining: "How many girls don't have access to education? Women's rights are still precarious in the world, so an attack like this makes me mad. We are lucky to express ourselves anyway we want."

Losique launched the Quebec adult entertainment television channel Vanessa TV in 2010. She and Marc Trudeau was granted a television licence by the broadcast regulator, the Canadian Radio-television and Telecommunications Commission (CRTC), in 2009. Losique first applied to the CRTC in 2006, seeking to broadcast explicit content all day, but her request was denied. For their later request, the two altered the request such that their station would air explicit content through the night and merely erotic content in the day. In partnership with the American company Vivid Entertainment, in 2014, Vanessa TV became Vivid TV Canada, with Losique as its president and CEO. In 2017, partnerships with the companies Hustler TV and Marc Dorcel produced the channels Hustler TV Canada and Dorcel TV Canada, respectively, distributed by her company Vanessa Media.

In 2017, the high-profile sexual misconduct scandal centred on film producer Harvey Weinstein triggered similar allegations of sexual misconduct against famous personalities, including Ben Affleck for his conduct in his 2004 interview with Losique. Losique defended Affleck, saying that he had acted that way only for the interview, and she accused American media of using the interview to fuel the scandal. Losique said she had previously rejected Weinstein's advances at the Toronto International Film Festival, during which he allegedly asked her to go to his room.

She headlined the Zoofest&OFF-JFL event at Zoofest 2018 for her comedy show Les dessous d’Anne-Marie.

== Personal life ==
Losique maintains a private personal life. La Presse journalist Nathalie Petrowski described Losique as a "monument to impenetrability". She lived with her boyfriend Marc Trudeau for about 15 years, during which they founded Image Diffusion International together in 1995. They separated in 2009, but continued working together.
