= Mortuary (disambiguation) =

A mortuary is a morgue, a place where dead bodies await final disposition such as burial or cremation.

Mortuary may also refer to:

- Funeral home, a business that provides interment and funeral services, which may be referred to as a mortuary in North American English

== Film and television ==
- Mortuary (1982 film), a 1982 American slasher film
- Mortuary (1983 film), a 1983 Indian Malayalam film
- Mortuary (2005 film), a 2005 American zombie film
- "Mortuary" (The Simple Life episode)
