= 10 Network =

10 Network may refer to:

- Ten Broadcasting, a Canadian broadcasting company specializing in adult programming
- Network 10, a major Australian commercial TV network
