= Pink TV =

Pink TV may refer to:

- Pink TV (France), a gay-themed French satellite television channel
- Pink TV (US), known as Heat TV in Europe, a pornographic television company based in the US
- Pink TV (Serbia), a TV network based in Serbia
