= Vivid TV (Europe) =

British English language pay TV channel

Vivid TV Europe
- Vivid TV logo
- Country: United Kingdom; Austria
- Broadcast area: National
- Network: Redlight TV
- Headquarters: London, UK

Programming
- Picture format: 480i (SDTV); 1080i (HDTV)

Ownership
- Owner: Redlight TV
- Sister channels: Vivid TV Canada (English)

History
- Launched: 1 November 2014

Links
- Website: Vivid TV

Vivid TV is a British English language Category B pay TV adult entertainment television channel consisting of primarily softcore adult content in the form of films, documentaries, reality shows, and variety shows, among others, between 6:00am to 11:00pm EST, while hardcore content, primarily from Vivid Entertainment, fills the remainder of the schedule. The channel is owned by Redlight TV

The channel also planned to launch in Austria.

== History ==
VividTV Europe launched by Redlight TV, a European adult television and will be led by Tony Cochi, EVP worldwide distribution of VividTV, and Stephen E. Walter, SVP of business development for Canada and Europe.

Bill Asher, co-chairman of Vivid Entertainment, said distribution deals with several major European operators will be announced shortly.

European viewers can now watch celebrity sex tapes and also pornographic-themed superhero parodies.

VividTV Europe will be available on Astra 1L 19.2 degrees East as well as via fibre and also available in video-on-demand services.
