= Red Hot TV =

Red Hot TV may refer to:

- Red Hot TV (Canada)
- Red Hot TV (UK)
