= Serge Losique =

Canadian film professor and festival organizer (1931–2026)

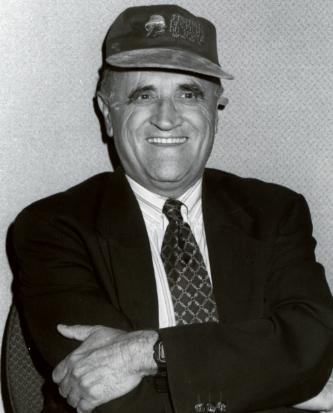
- Born: Srdjan Losic; November 1, 1931; Kingdom of Yugoslavia
- Died: September 8, 2026 (aged 94); Granby, Quebec, Canada
- Occupations: Professor and festival organiser
- Children: Jacques Beaudry-Losique, François Beaudry-Losique, Anne-Marie Losique

Serge Losique (né Srdjan Losic; November 1, 1931 – September 8, 2026) was a Québécois writer, film professor, festival organizer, director and scriptwriter. He was best known as the founder of the Montreal World Film Festival.

== Background ==
Losique was born as Srdjan Losic on November 1, 1931, in the Kingdom of Yugoslavia. Losique first studied literature in France in the 1950s, at the University of Toulouse and then at the Sorbonne in Paris where, alongside his studies, he regularly attended the Cinémathèque française and those who would form what came to be called the French New Wave. He obtained a doctorate in 1965 (thesis: L'idéal humain de Saint-Exupéry, published by A.G. Nizet).

Losique died in Granby, Quebec on September 8, 2026, at the age of 94.

== Conservatory of Cinematographic Art ==
After arriving in Canada in 1957, he taught at Collège de Montréal and then at Sir George Williams University, which later merged with Loyola to become Concordia University in 1974. Alongside his activities as director of the French department, he created, within the University, the Conservatory of Cinematographic Art in 1968. One of his first guests was Henri Langlois, creator of the Cinémathèque française, whom Serge Losique persuaded to come regularly to give film courses to the general public, while Henri Langlois's position at the Cinémathèque française was weakened by what was called the «affaire Langlois». This collaboration of several years enabled the Conservatory of Cinematographic Art to take off. In 1969, Serge Losique launched the first Canadian Student Film Festival which, from 1985, was presented as a special section of the Montreal World Film Festival.

After Henri Langlois's death in 1977, Serge Losique proposed to Jean-Luc Godard, at a time when he had become marginalized and his films were little distributed, that he continue the work undertaken by Langlois. Starting in 1978, the sessions open to the general public took place on weekends, with a notable difference from Langlois's courses: it was a co-production project to create a film about the history of cinema. It was partly thanks to this contribution that Godard was later able to make «Histoire(s) du cinéma».

For many years, starting in 1968, the Conservatory of Cinematographic Art was an essential institution, presenting around 600 films a year to a broad public, with numerous invited directors and actors. With the widespread adoption of video and DVD formats, the Conservatory ceased its activities in 1998.

== Montreal World Film Festival ==
Losique launched the first Montreal World Film Festival in 1977. A highly international selection with guests who had marked the history of cinema (Howard Hawks, Ingrid Bergman, Gloria Swanson, etc.) got things off to a strong start and, as early as the following year, the Festival was recognized by FIAPF (International Federation of Film Producers Associations) as the only competitive festival in North America.

The Montreal fest was conceived as an alternative to the Venice Film Festival, which had been sidelined over political strife for most of the preceding decade. Losique, well connected in the international film community, says he was pressured by the MPAA head Jack Valenti and European producers to make Montreal the home of a competitive film festival. But he caved on the guarantee he could control the event and avoid having too many cooks fighting for their vision.

It was its openness to the world that gave this festival its prestige, as it was, for example, the first to present a Chinese film in competition, at a time when that country had just emerged from the Mao period. The festival provides an alternative to film fans looking for something beyond Hollywood. Over the years, many directors were discovered at the Montreal World Film Festival. It was first and foremost a place to celebrate cinema auteurs and engage in the love of international filmmaking.

Outdoor screening - Montreal World Film Festival

Serge Losique was the chief of the Montreal World Film Festival for over three decades.

The Festival's public success aroused envy and several attempts to destabilize it and oust Serge Losique took place. The last one, when he refused to step aside despite his age, resulted in the withdrawal of subsidies, which led to the Festival's cessation in 2019.

== Partial filmography ==
- 1970: No More Words directed by Serge Losique
- 2004: Le Fantôme d'Henri Langlois by Jacques Richard
- 2005: L'est rencontre l'ouest sur la route de la soie, co-production Canada-China, directed by Serge Losique (6 episodes)
- 2007: Man of cinema: Pierre Rissient by Todd McCarthy

== Bibliography ==
- Dictionnaire étymologique des noms de pays et de peuples, Paris, Édition Klincksieck, 1971
- Le Quebec et sa littérature, Paris, Armand Colin, 1969
- De Z à A: un scribomatic; Montreal, Édition du jour, 1969
- L'Idéal humain de Saint-Exupéry, Paris, Nizet, 1965
- Lecture Québec, Edition du Renouveau pédagogique, 1969-70
