= Penthouse HDTV =

Penthouse HDTV Europe
- Penthouse HD logo
- Country: Spain

Programming
- Language(s): English
- Picture format: 1080i (HDTV)

Ownership
- Sister channels: Penthouse TV; Penthouse TV (Canada)

History
- Launched: 5 October 2009

Links
- Website: www.penthousetv.com

Availability

Streaming media
- Canal Digitaal Live: Penthouse Live

Penthouse HDTV (or simply known as Penthouse HD) is an adult entertainment channel primarily broadcasting in high-definition format. For over 40 years, Penthouse has published the Penthouse magazine and directed and produced movies, video games, sports, and gadgets. Penthouse has created three HDTV channels available in Europe.

== History ==
Penthouse have created adult erotic movies for many years, moving towards pornographic movies in 1998, and to High-definition in 2006. Since then they have filmed exclusively in HD format. In October 2009, Penthouse HDTV launched their new HDTV channels in Europe, three of which contain high definition pornographic adult content.

== Technical information relating to HDTV ==
=== Satellites ===
Penthouse HDTV broadcasts its channels via one of the Eutelsat satellites. Access to the HD channels is via the use of a set-top box and a smart card reaching territories across the entire geographical region of Europe. The Penthouse HDTV channels can also be viewed with existing Hot Bird equipment with the help of dual feed solutions such as monoblock LNB equipment, double LNB equipment and the ClipSat device. The dual feed equipment works for reception equipment of the Eurobird 9A at 9° east as well as the Hot Bird at 13° east.

== Penthouse HDTV channels ==
Penthouse launched three HD channels in Europe in 2009. Penthouse HDTV channels are the first completely HD adult specific content channels in Europe. Three channels broadcast 24 hours per day.

- Penthouse Passion softcore content.
- Penthouse Gold hardcore content.
- Penthouse Quickies hardcore content.
- Penthouse Black hardcore content.
- Penthouse Naughty Nights
- Penthouse After Midnight

All channels show movies and clips from the Penthouse brands.

The Penthouse HDTV channels are DTH (Direct-to-Home), IPTV and cable channels.

== See also ==
- List of adult television channels
