= DVB-T2 =

Second revision of the DVB-T standard

DVB-T2 is an abbreviation for "Digital Video Broadcasting – Second Generation Terrestrial"; it is the extension of the television standard DVB-T, issued by the consortium DVB, devised for the broadcast transmission of digital terrestrial television. DVB has been standardised by ETSI.

This system transmits compressed digital audio, video, and other data in "physical layer pipes" (PLPs), using OFDM modulation with concatenated channel coding and interleaving. The higher offered bit rate, with respect to its predecessor DVB-T, makes it a system suited for carrying HDTV signals on the terrestrial TV channel (though many broadcasters still use plain DVB-T for this purpose).

As of 2019, DVB-T2 was implemented in broadcasts in the United Kingdom (Freeview HD, eight channels across two multiplexes, plus an extra multiplex in Northern Ireland carrying three SD channels), Italy (Europa 7 HD, twelve channels), Finland (21 channels, five in HD), Germany (six HD (1080p50) channels, with 40 in planning), the Netherlands (Digitenne, 30 HD (1080p50) channels), Sweden (five channels), Thailand (41 SD, 9 HD channels), Flanders (18 SD channels), Serbia (three national multiplexes, one covering the national broadcasters, one covering the local broadcasters and one carrying Pay TV), Ukraine (40 SD and HD channels in five nationwide multiplexes), Croatia (all national, local and pay-TV channels), Denmark (two pay-TV multiplexes with 20 channels), Romania (8 SD channels, 1 HD channel), and some other countries.

== History ==
=== Preliminary investigation ===
In March 2006, DVB decided to study options for an upgraded DVB-T standard. In June 2006, a formal study group named TM-T2 (Technical Module on Next Generation DVB-T) was established by the DVB Group to develop an advanced modulation scheme that could be adopted by a second generation digital terrestrial television standard, to be named DVB-T2.

According to the commercial requirements and call for technologies issued in April 2007, the first phase of DVB-T2 would be devoted to provide optimum reception for stationary (fixed) and portable receivers (i.e., units which can be nomadic, but not fully mobile) using existing aerials, whereas a second and third phase would study methods to deliver higher payloads (with new aerials) and the mobile reception issue. The novel system should provide a minimum 30% increase in payload, under similar channel conditions already used for DVB-T.

The BBC, ITV, Channel 4 and Channel 5 agreed with the regulator Ofcom to convert one UK multiplex (B, or PSB3) to DVB-T2 to increase capacity for HDTV via DTT. They expected the first TV region to use the new standard would be Granada in November 2009 (with existing switched over regions being changed at the same time). It was expected that over time there would be enough DVB-T2 receivers sold to switch all DTT transmissions to DVB-T2, and H.264.

Ofcom published its final decision on 3 April 2008, for HDTV using DVB-T2 and H.264: BBC HD would have one HD slot after digital switchover (DSO) at Granada. ITV and C4 had, as expected, applied to Ofcom for the 2 additional HD slots available from 2009 to 2012.

Ofcom indicated that it found an unused channel covering 3.7 million households in London, which could be used to broadcast the DVB-T2 HD multiplex from 2010, i.e., before DSO in London. Ofcom indicated that they would look for more unused UHF channels in other parts of the UK, that can be used for the DVB-T2 HD multiplex from 2010 until DSO.

=== The DVB-T2 specification ===
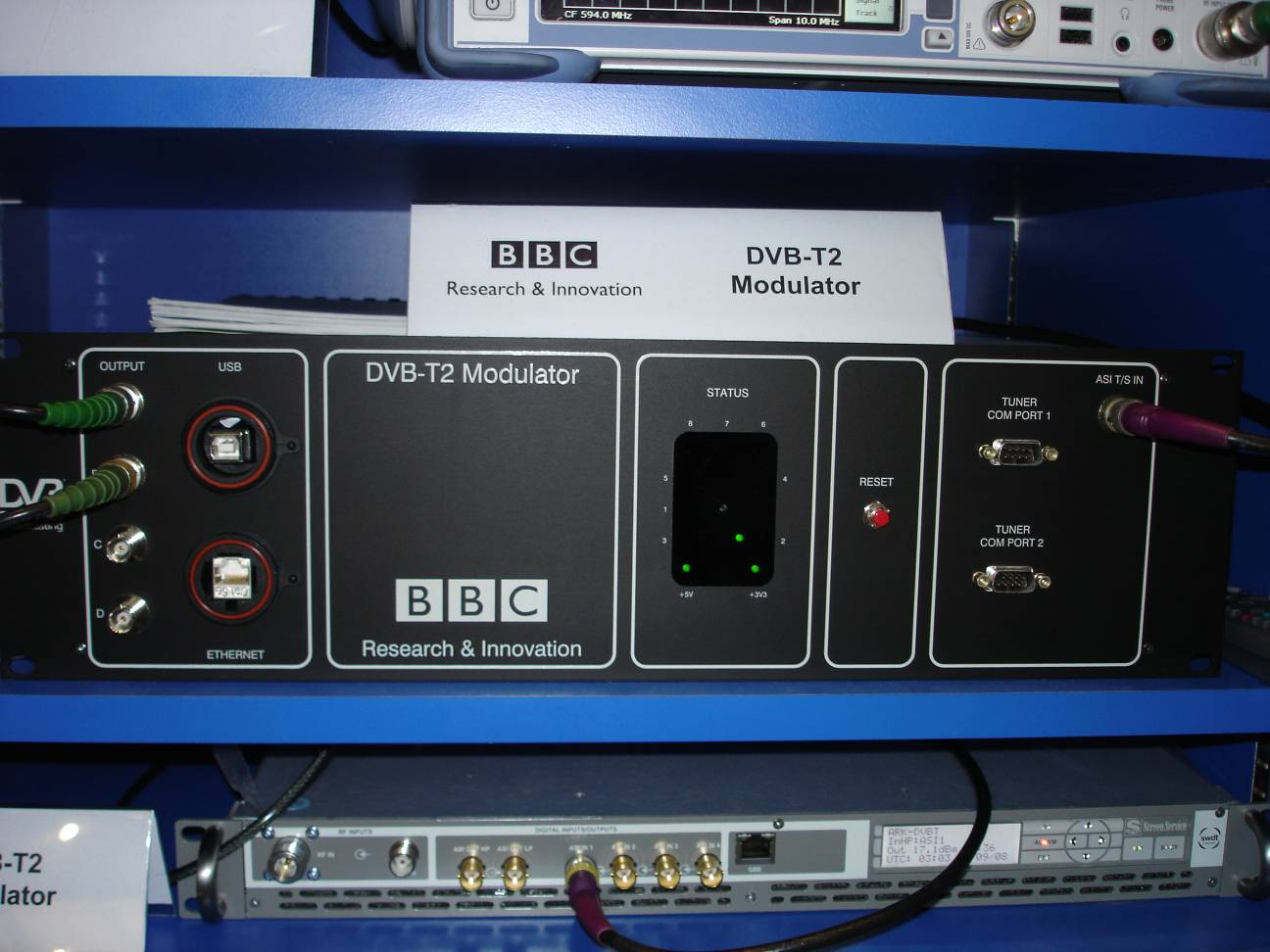
DVB-T2 test modulator developed by BBC Research & Development

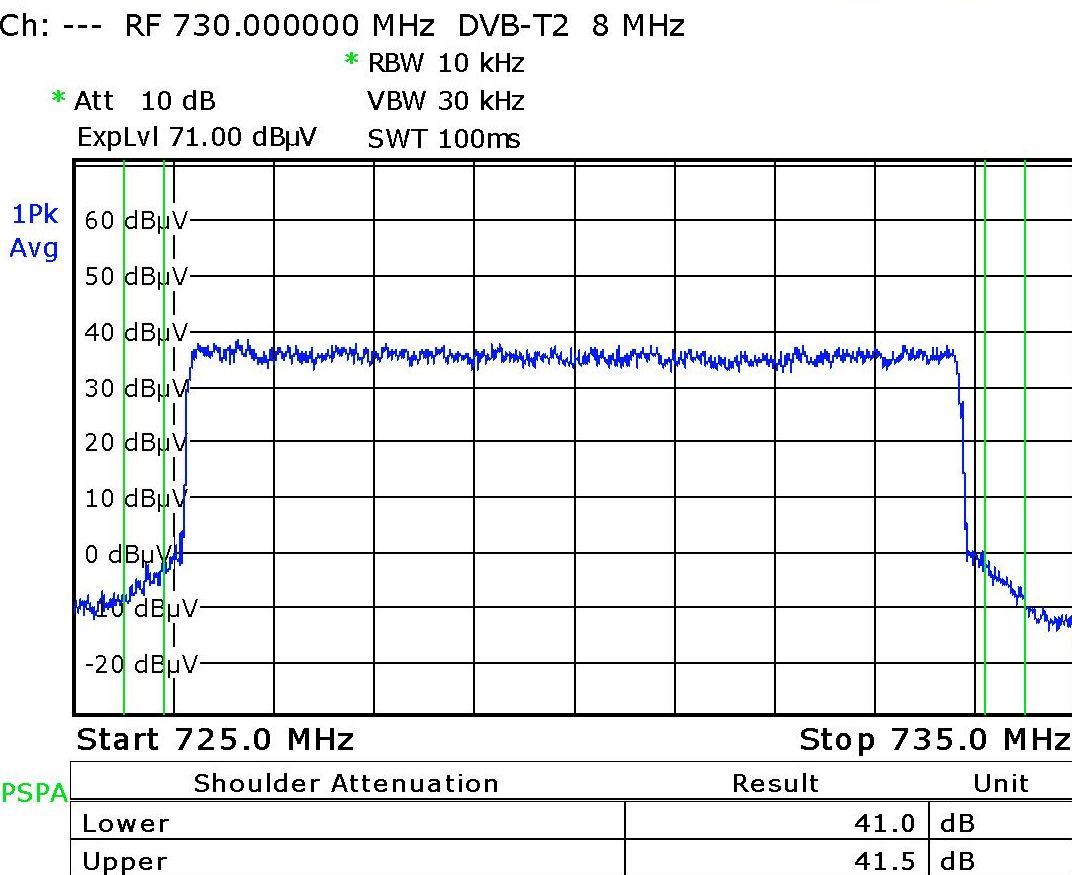
Spectrum of a DVB-T2 signal (8 MHz channel)

The DVB-T2 draft standard was ratified by the DVB Steering Board on 26 June 2008, and published on the DVB homepage as DVB-T2 standard BlueBook. It was handed over to the European Telecommunications Standards Institute (ETSI) by DVB.ORG on 20 June 2008. The ETSI process resulted in the DVB-T2 standard being adopted on 9 September 2009. The ETSI process had several phases, but the only changes were text clarifications. Since the DVB-T2 physical layer specification was complete, and there would be no further technical enhancements, receiver VLSI chip design started with confidence in stability of specification. A draft PSI/SI (program and system information) specification document was also agreed with the DVB-TM-GBS group.

=== Tests ===
Prototype receivers were shown in September IBC 2008 and more recent version at the IBC 2009 in Amsterdam. A number of other manufacturers demonstrated DVB-T2 at IBC 2009 including Albis Technologies, Arqiva, DekTec, Enensys Technologies, Harris, Pace, Rohde & Schwarz, Tandberg, Thomson Broadcast and TeamCast. As of 2012, Appear TV also produce DVB-T2 receivers, DVB-T2 modulators and DVB-T2 gateways. Other manufacturers planning DVB-T2 equipment launches include Alitronika, CellMetric, Cisco, Digital TV Labs, Humax, NXP Semiconductors, Panasonic, ProTelevision Technologies, Screen Service, SIDSA, Sony, ST Microelectronics and T-VIPS. The first test from a real TV transmitter was performed by the BBC Research & Development in the last weeks of June 2008 using channel 53 from the Guildford transmitter, southwest of London: BBC had developed and built the modulator/demodulator prototype in parallel with the DVB-T2 standard being drafted. Other companies like ENKOM or IfN develop software (processor) based decoding.

NORDIG published a DVB-T2 receiver specification and performance requirement on 1 July 2009. In March 2009 the Digital TV Group (DTG), the industry association for digital TV in the UK, published the technical specification for high definition services on digital terrestrial television (Freeview) using the new DVB-T2 standard. The DTG's test house: DTG Testing are testing Freeview HD products against this specification.

Many tests broadcast transmission using this standard are being in process in France, with local Gap filler near Rennes CCETT.

DVB-T2 was tested in October 2010, in Geneva region, with Mont Salève's repeater, in UHF band on Channel 36. A mobile van was testing BER, strength, and quality reception, with special PCs used as spectrum analysers, constellation testers. The van was moving in Canton Geneva (Switzerland), and France (Annemasse, Pays de Gex). However, none were demonstrated in TELECOM 2011 at Palexpo.

== The standard ==
The following characteristics have been devised for the T2 standard:

- COFDM modulation with QPSK, 16-QAM, 64-QAM, or 256-QAM constellations.
- OFDM modes are 1k, 2k, 4k, 8k, 16k, and 32k. The symbol length for 32k mode is about 4 ms.
- Guard intervals are 1/128, 1/32, 1/16, 19/256, 1/8, 19/128, and 1/4. (For 32k mode, the maximum is 1/8.)
- FEC is concatenated LDPC and BCH codes (as in DVB-S2 and DVB-C2), with rates 1/2, 3/5, 2/3, 3/4, 4/5, and 5/6.
- There are fewer pilots, in 8 different pilot-patterns, and equalization can be based also on the RAI CD3 system.
- In the 32k mode, a larger part of the standard 8 MHz channel can be used, adding about 2% extra capacity.
- DVB-T2 is specified for 1.7, 5, 6, 7, 8, and 10 MHz channel bandwidth.
- MISO (Multiple-Inputs, Single-Output) may be used (Alamouti scheme), but MIMO will not be used. Diversity receivers can be used (as they are with DVB-T).
- Multiple PLPs to enable service-specific robustness at a particular bit rate.
- Bundling of more channels into a SuperMUX (called TFS) is not in the standard, but may be added later.

== System differences with DVB-T ==
The following table reports a comparison of available modes in DVB-T and DVB-T2.

| | DVB-T | DVB-T2 |
|---|---|---|
| Input interface | Single transport stream (TS) | Multiple transport streams and Generic Stream Encapsulation (GSE) |
| Modes | Constant coding & modulation | Variable coding & modulation |
| Forward error correction (FEC) | Convolutional coding + Reed–Solomon; 1/2, 2/3, 3/4, 5/6, 7/8 | LDPC + BCH; 1/2, 3/5, 2/3, 3/4, 4/5, 5/6, 6/7, 8/9 |
| Modulation | OFDM | |
| Modulation schemes | QPSK, 16QAM, 64QAM | QPSK, 16QAM, 64QAM, 256QAM |
| Guard interval | 1/4, 1/8, 1/16, 1/32 | 1/4, 19/128, 1/8, 19/256, 1/16, 1/32, 1/128 |
| Discrete Fourier transform (DFT) size | 2k, 8k | 1k, 2k, 4k, 8k, 16k, 32k |
| Scattered pilots | 8% of total | 1%, 2%, 4%, 8% of total |
| Continual pilots | 2.6% of total | 0.35% of total |
| Channel widths | 6MHz, 7MHz, 8MHz | 1.7MHz, 5MHz, 6MHz, 7MHz, 8MHz, 10MHz (Note: 10MHz bandwidth is intended for professional applications only, and not expected to be supported by domestic receivers.) |
| Physical layer pipes | No | Yes |

For instance, a UK MFN DVB-T profile (64-QAM, 8k mode, coding rate 2/3, guard interval 1/32) and a DVB-T2 equivalent (256-QAM, 32k, coding rate 3/5, guard interval 1/128) allows for an increase in bit rate from 24.13 Mbit/s to 35.4 Mbit/s (+46.5%). Another example, for an Italian SFN DVB-T profile (64-QAM, 8k, coding rate 2/3, guard interval 1/4) and a DVB-T2 equivalent (256-QAM, 32k, coding rate 3/5, guard interval 1/16), achieves an increase in bit rate from 19.91 Mbit/s to 33.3 Mbit/s (+67%).

Recommended maximum bit-rate configurations for 8 MHz bandwidth, 32K FFT, guard interval 1/128, pilot pattern 7:

| Modu- lation | Code rate | Bitrate (Mbit/s) | Frame length LF | FEC blocks per frame |
|---|---|---|---|---|
| QPSK | 1/2 | 7.4442731 | 60 | 50 |
| QPSK | 3/5 | 8.9457325 | 60 | 50 |
| QPSK | 2/3 | 9.9541201 | 60 | 50 |
| QPSK | 3/4 | 11.197922 | 60 | 50 |
| QPSK | 4/5 | 11.948651 | 60 | 50 |
| QPSK | 5/6 | 12.456553 | 60 | 50 |
| 16-QAM | 1/2 | 15.037432 | 60 | 101 |
| 16-QAM | 3/5 | 18.07038 | 60 | 101 |
| 16-QAM | 2/3 | 20.107323 | 60 | 101 |
| 16-QAM | 3/4 | 22.619802 | 60 | 101 |
| 16-QAM | 4/5 | 24.136276 | 60 | 101 |
| 16-QAM | 5/6 | 25.162236 | 60 | 101 |
| 64-QAM | 1/2 | 22.481705 | 60 | 151 |
| 64-QAM | 3/5 | 27.016112 | 60 | 151 |
| 64-QAM | 2/3 | 30.061443 | 60 | 151 |
| 64-QAM | 3/4 | 33.817724 | 60 | 151 |
| 64-QAM | 4/5 | 36.084927 | 60 | 151 |
| 64-QAM | 5/6 | 37.618789 | 60 | 151 |
| 256-QAM | 1/2 | 30.074863 | 60 | 202 |
| 256-QAM | 3/5 | 36.140759 | 60 | 202 |
| 256-QAM | 2/3 | 40.214645 | 60 | 202 |
| 256-QAM | 3/4 | 45.239604 | 60 | 202 |
| 256-QAM | 4/5 | 48.272552 | 60 | 202 |
| 256-QAM | 5/6 | 50.324472 | 60 | 202 |

== Technical details ==
DVB-T2 at a glance

Framing structure of DVB-T2

The processing workflow is as follows:

- Input pre-processing
  - Physical Layer Pipe (PLP)
    - PLPs, which had already been introduced in DVB-S2, are logical channels carrying one or more services, with a modulation scheme and robustness particular to that individual pipe.
    - PLP creation: adaptation of Transport Stream (TS), Generic Stream Encapsulation (GSE), Generic Continuous Stream (GCS), or Generic Fixed-length Packetized Stream (GFPS)
- Input processing
  - Mode adaptation
    - Single PLP (mode 'A'): data are assembled in groups called BaseBand Frames (BBFRAMEs), with lengths of $K_{bch}$ bits, defined by modulation and coding (MODCOD) parameters, in a 'normal' length or 'short' length version
      - Input interface
      - CRC-8 encoding
      - BaseBand (BB) header insertion
    - Multiple PLPs (mode 'B')
      - Input interface
      - Input stream synchronization
      - Delay compensation
      - Null packets deletion
      - CRC-8 encoding
      - BB header insertion
  - Stream adaptation
    - Single PLP (mode 'A')
      - Padding insertion
      - BB scrambling: a Pseudo Random Binary Sequence (PRBS) with generator $1+x^{14}+x^{15}$ is used to scramble completely every BBFRAME
    - Multiple PLPs (mode 'B')
      - PLP scheduling
      - Frame delay
      - In-band signaling or padding insertion
      - BB scrambling
- Bit Interleaved Coding and Modulation (BICM)
  - Forward Error Correction (FEC) encoding: each BBFRAME is converted into a FECFRAME of $N_{ldpc}$ bits, by adding parity data. Normal FECFRAMEs are 64,800 bits long, whereas short FECFRAMEs are 16,200 bits long. The effective code rates are 32,208/64,800 (1/2), 38,688/64,800 (3/5), 43,040/64,800 (2/3), 48,408/64,800 (3/4), 51,648/64,800 (4/5), 53,840/64,800 (5/6)
    - Outer encoding: a BCH code, capable to correct 10 or 12 errors per FECFRAME, is used to compute parity data for the information data field. The BCH generator polynomial is of the 160th, 168th, or 192nd grade
    - Inner encoding: a Low Density Parity Check (LDPC) code is cascaded to the BCH
  - Bit interleaving
    - Parity bits block interleaving
    - Twist column interleaving
  - Bit demultiplexing to cell words
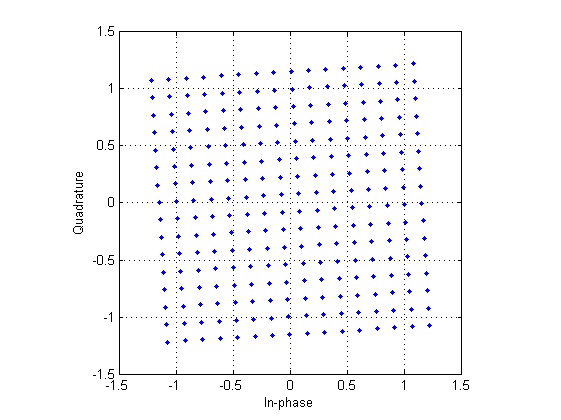
    Constellation map of the rotated 256-QAM modulation (tilt angle is 3.57 degrees)
  - Gray mapping of cell words to constellations: either QPSK (4-QAM), 16-QAM, 64-QAM, or 256-QAM maps are used
  - Constellation rotation and cyclic quadrature (Q) delay: optionally, the constellations may be tilted counterclockwise by an amount of up to 30 degrees. Furthermore, the quadrature (imaginary) part of the cells is cyclically shifted by one cell
  - Cell interleaving
  - Time interleaving
- Frame building: the transmitted stream is organized in super frames, which are composed by T2 frames and FEF (Future Extension Frame) parts
  - Cell mapping: cells are mapped to OFDM symbols. A T2 frame is composed by a P1 symbol, one or more P2 symbols, regular data symbols, and a Frame Closing symbol (for certain configuration parameters). The P1 symbol is used for synchronization purposes, the P2 symbols convey L1 parameter configuration signaling, whereas the data symbols carry PLP data (there are three types: common PLPs, type 1 PLPs, and type 2 PLPs), auxiliary streams, and dummy symbols used as space filler
  - Frequency interleaving: random interleaving is done on every OFDM symbol (except P1)
- OFDM generation
  - Multiple-Input Single-Output (MISO) processing: Alamouti pre-processing is optionally applied to pairs of OFDM symbol cells. Given $a_i$ the input cells, $e^{(1)}_i$ and $e^{(2)}_i$ transmitter group 1 and 2 cells, the mapping is done as $e^{(1)}_i = a_i$ and $e^{(1)}_{i+1} = a_{i+1}$ for group 1, and as $e^{(2)}_i = -a^*_{i+1}$ and $e^{(2)}_{i+1} = a^*_{i}$ for group 2
  - Pilot insertion and dummy tone reservation: three classes of pilot tones are added. They are either continual (fixed position), scattered (cyclically moving position), or edge (boundary positions). There are 8 different configuration for scattered pilots (PP1 ... PP8). Moreover, a number of dummy carriers are not modulated and reserved to reduce the dynamic range of the DVB-T2 output signal (it helps to combat nonlinear phenomena in power amplifiers during broadcast).
  - Inverse Discrete Fourier Transform (IDFT): classic IDFT is used to switch from the frequency domain into the time domain, after having adjusted carrier position relevant to the central transmit frequency. 1k (1024) to 32k (32768) carriers are available. There is also an extended mode, which allows to fill more data in the available bandwidth, using more active carriers and reducing the number of guard band (null) carriers.
  - Peak-to-Average-Power-Ratio (PAPR) reduction, also called crest factor reduction
  - Guard interval insertion: a cyclic prefix is inserted before the IDFT symbol, to recover from transmit channel echoes (multipath). Lengths from 1/128 to 1/4 of the IDFT length are allowed.
  - P1 symbol insertion: the P1 symbol is a particularly crafted 1k OFDM symbol, always inserted at the head of a T2 frame. It conveys few bits of information (spread, scrambled and DBPSK modulated), as it is mainly dedicated to fast synchronization (both in time and in frequency) at the receiver side. It is prepended and postpended by frequency shifted repetitions of itself, to ease receiver lock even if the nominal center frequency of the T2 signal is up to 500 kHz off.
  - Digital-to-Analog Conversion (DAC): the T2 samples are converted into an analog BB complex (I&Q) signal at a sample rate that depends on the channelization bandwidth. For instance, in 8 MHz wide channels, the complex sample time is 7/64 μs.
- Adaptive coding and modulation ACM
  - Adaptive coding and modulation (ACM), allows to adapt the transmission's parameters to the reception conditions required by the terminals, for example changing into a lower coding speed during attenuation.

== Market adoption ==
European countries by DVB-T(2) standard

When the digital terrestrial HDTV service Freeview HD was launched in December 2009, it was the first DVB-T2 service intended for the general public. As of November 2010, DVB-T2 broadcasts were available in a couple of European countries.

The earliest introductions of T2 have usually been tied with a launch of high-definition television. There are however some countries where HDTV is broadcast using the old DVB-T standard with no immediate plans to switch those broadcasts to DVB-T2. Among countries using DVB-T for nationwide broadcasts of HDTV are France, Ireland, Italy, Norway, Denmark, Spain, and Taiwan. These are usually using MPEG4. Australia started broadcasting HD content over DVB-T with MPEG2, although in 2015, some Australian broadcasters switched to MPEG4.

Countries where DVB-T2 is in use include:

- Afghanistan: Four multiplexes. Full launch in April 2015
- Albania: One multiplex. Full launch in July 2011.
- Argentina: Launch in February 2014 (Antina – UHF operating DVB-T in Buenos Aires area).
- Armenia: Launch in May 2015.
- Austria: Three multiplexes (D, E, F), 22 transmission sites. Full launch in April 2013.
- Belarus: Two multiplexes (2nd and 3rd), 89 transmission sites.
- Belgium: DVB-T2 H.265 started on 17 July 2023. Only RTBF (French speaking region) VRT Flemish speaking switch off broadcast 1 December 2018 relaying on cable TV only
- Croatia: Two multiplexes launched in late 2012 for pay TV platform EVO TV. Two public multiplexes (M1, M2). Soft launch in November 2019, full launch in July 2020.
- Colombia: Adoption started in 2012.
- Cyprus: Launched on 30 March 2026. Migration from DVB-T scheduled to be completed by 1 July 2026.
- Czech Republic: Migration from DVB-T launched in March 2017 and was completed in October 2020.
- Denmark: Two multiplexes.
- Estonia: Two multiplexes: first mux (using H264 video coding, FTA HD channels) – soft launch in December 2012 (not all transmitters), full launch in February 2019 (all transmitter sites, including gap-fillers); second mux (using H.265 video coding, 10 HD channels, pay-TV) – soft launch in October 2019 (not all transmitters), full launch in December 2019 (all main transmitter sites).
- Finland: Full launch in November 2024, exclusively DVB-T2 June 2025.
- France: Announced in May 2014 for DVB-T2 tests in Paris for Ultra HD HEVC broadcast with objectives to replace the current DVB-T MPEG4 national broadcast.
- Georgia: Launch on 1 July 2015.
- Germany: Six muxes are carried, with three for public TV and three for private, the latter of which require a monthly fee. In rural areas, only the three public TV muxes are in operation. Available TV channels range from 20 to 40, depending on which muxes are available. H.265 is the used codec with Full-HD by 50 Hz (1080p), which some hardware is not compatible in Germany but compatible in Europe with H.264.
- Iceland: Adoption to begin in 2013 and finish by end of 2014.
- India: Launched on 25 February 2016.
- Indonesia: Adoption supposedly began in 2012, full launch began in 2019. However, it was delayed until 2022, where analog were phased out gradually between April – November 2022 and the remaining several areas were finally terminated at 17 August 2023.
- Iran: Soft launch in March 2012 and Full launch in April 2013, However, it was delayed until 2018. Analogue signals finally terminated on 4 May 2023 in Tehran.
- Iraq: Launched on 1 July 2015.
- Israel: Tests begun in 2015, regular service in mid-2017, through the Idan+ service. In January 2025 the Second Authority for Television and Radio announced the closure of DVB-T mux. All TV and radio channels that were available on the old system will be moved to DVB-Ts as on 29 January 2025.
- Italy: Europa 7 HD channels, now no longer broadcast, launched in 2010 using DVB-T2. All TV sets sold after 1 January 2017 must be DVB-T2 compliant. On 28 August 2024 Rai Mux B was converted to DVB-T2. Many TV channels are still on DVB-T.
- Kazakhstan: four multiplex channels, Soft launch in July 2012 and Full launch in July 2021.
- Kenya: Multichoice Africa using the GOTV brand launched in September 2011.
- Malaysia: Soft launch in 2016, full launch in mid-2017. Abandoned analog on 31 October 2019.
- Mongolia: Six multiplex channels, Soft launch in May 2011. Full launch in October 2015.
- Nepal: Prabhu TV started the service in 2018.
- Netherlands: Switch to the DVB-T2 HEVC standard completed on 9 July 2019.
- New Zealand: One multiplex with a full launch in 2012 via the Igloo platform – a joint venture between Sky Television and Television New Zealand.
- North Korea: Four DVB-T2 multiplexes, digital TV broadcasting trials began on 2012.
- Poland: From the beginning of 2021, the signal is broadcast in the DVB-T2 standard throughout the country. Plans to switch from DVB-T to DVB-T2 HEVC on 30 June 2022.
- Romania: DVB-T2 is the official standard for over-the-air TV broadcasts. Older DVB-T was only used in experimental transmissions in two cities, and will be phased out. The analogue switchoff was made on 2015/06/17, although the complete digital switchover was still in progress at that time. Romania has allocated 5 nationwide DVB-T2 multiplexes, as well as more than 50 regional/local ones.
- Russia: Two multiplexes, 20 TV and 3 radio channels. Soft launch in March 2012, full launch in October 2019.
- Serbia: Three multiplexes. Soft launch in March 2012, full launch in April 2013 is postponed till May 2015, before settled in June 2015.
- Singapore: Full launch in 2016, 7 TV channels broadcast in HD. Full launch in January 2019.
- Slovakia: Migration to DVB-T2 started in June 2016 and is expected to end on September 22, 2026.
- Spain: One national TV multiplex. All other multiplexes will be migrated at once after TV receiver support reaches 95%.
- Sweden: Two multiplexes. Full launch in November 2010.
- Switzerland: Switched off DVB-T in 2019, with no plans to switch to another digital terrestrial system.
- Thailand: Full launch on 1 April 2014 with H.264 encoding (up to 48 channels, 5 multiplexes)
- Turkey: Seven DVB-T2 multiplexes in the largest 16 cities. Launched between 2013 and 2015.
- Ukraine: Five DVB-T2 multiplexes × 167 transmission sites, 150 of which have been officially launched on 10 October 2011.
- United Kingdom: Three multiplexes, soft launch in December 2009, full launch in April 2010. An additional DVB-T2 multiplex was launched in Northern Ireland in October 2012, and extra one launched across selected areas of the UK in December 2013.
- Vietnam: Three multiplexes, soft launch on 11 November 2011, by the Audio Visual Global JSC. Full launch on 28 December 2020.

Countries/continents/regions where DVB-T2 is planned in use include:

- Southern African Development Community: Announced in November 2010 that DVB-T2 would be the preferred standard for the region. Botswana is the only country within the region which uses the ISDB-T International (SBTVD).

=== Afghanistan ===
In April 2015, "OQAAB" started DVB-T2 broadcasting in Kabul. As of 2021, the process is at a standstill after the Taliban's return to power, and the previous government never authorized more than test broadcasts. The infrastructure in six more provinces (Herat, Kandahar, Jalalabad, Mazar, Ghazni, Kunduz) had been built out, without transmitter installation.

=== Albania ===
In July 2011, "DigitAlb" started DVB-T2 broadcasting in Durrës, Tirana on UHF with 29 channels (26 HD, 3 in SD).

=== Belgium ===
In April 2013, Telenet started with DVB-T2 broadcasting in Flanders. However it was discontinued one year later on 31 March 2014. As of the end of 2017, TV Vlaanderen started offering DVB-T2 television using Norkring's network. The following centre frequencies are used in Flanders: 650 MHz (UHF ch. 43), 658 MHz (UHF ch. 44), 674 MHz (UHF ch. 46) and 682 MHz (UHF ch. 47).

=== Colombia ===
In 2012, Colombia adopted DVB-T2 (using a bandwidth of 6 MHz) as the national standard for terrestrial television. This replaced DVB-T, the previously selected standard for digital TV, which was chosen after technical evaluation of several digital TV standards. The two standards coexisted until 2015 when DVB-T was turned off.

Digital TV has been deployed gradually across the country, starting with the four main cities, Bogotá, Medellín, Cali and Barranquilla followed by smaller cities such as Armenia, Bucaramanga, Cartagena, Cúcuta, Manizales, Pereira and Santa Marta. By 2014, most main cities had digital TV. Due to the country's topography as well as there being no sharing of masts between the public and private broadcasters, the coverage in rural areas is patchy. There has been talk of using DVB-S2 (satellite) to ensure 100% coverage: as of January 2024 this hasn't happened.

The first two transmissions were by the two private TV channels RCN TV and Caracol TV. RTVC (the national government TV broadcaster) started to broadcast using the standard in 2013.

The digital system is known in Colombia as TDT which means Televisión Digital Terrestre (Digital Terrestrial Television).

=== Croatia ===
On 13 October 2011, the Croatian Post and Electronic Communications Agency granted license for MUX C and MUX E, both in DVB-T2 standard.

Also in October 2011, OiV – Transmitters & Communications started testing on UHF channel 53 (730.00 MHz) from Sljeme.

Two DVB-T2 multiplexes launched in late 2012 by pay TV platform EVO TV.

In addition to that in September 2019 DVB-T2 was launched for free-to-air television, using the HEVC/H.265 codec and 720p or 1080p resolution. As of Winter 2020, legacy DVB-T broadcasts have ceased. In that time, EVOtv has issued brand new TV set-top boxes with the HEVC/H.265 DVB-T2 codec.

=== Czech Republic ===
DVB-T2 was launched in March 2017, using video format HEVC/H.265. DVB-T was switched off in October 2020. In 2020, there was tested Nasa TV in 4K resolution to show that the DVB T2 system is capable of 4K and the devices can decode it.

=== Finland ===
Finland, the first country in Europe to cease analog terrestrial TV and move to DVB-T, launched DVB-T2 fully in November 2024 and DVB-T2 has been used exclusively from June 2025.

=== India ===
Digital Terrestrial Television services to provide mobile TV at 19 cities e.g. Pitampura(Delhi)(578.00 MHz; UHF ch. 34), Mumbai (474.00 MHz and 522.00 MHz; UHF ch. 21 and ch. 27), Kolkata, Chennai, Guwahati, Patna, Ranchi, Cuttack, Lucknow, Jallandhar, Raipur, Indore, Aurangabad, Bhopal, Bangalore, Ahmedabad, Hyderabad, Trivandrum and Srinagar were started on 25 February 2016. Mobile TV can be received using DVB-T2 Dongles in OTG enabled smart phones and tablets, Wi-Fi dongles, besides in integrated digital TV (iDTV).

Public and private transportation vehicles and public places are potential environments for mobile television. Currently DD National, DD National HD, DD News, DD Bharati, DD Sports, and DD Regional/DD Kisan are being relayed.

=== Indonesia ===
The project to adopt DVB-T technology in Indonesia began in 2007 with 'full' government support as the project initiator. All television broadcasters were offered to transform their analogue broadcasts into the new digital form, some were interested to follow suit and started testing their new digital broadcasts and some are still uninterested back then.

During the DVB-T testing period, the Indonesian government (via its Ministry of Information & Communication Technology) wanted to switch to DVB-T2 technology which provides better signal efficiency, capacity and corrections compared to DVB-T. The TV broadcasters still testing their DVB-T broadcasts agreed to join the DVB-T2 conversion programme offered by the government since they saw the significant benefits by switching to DVB-T2 (such as higher data rate for HD content and better carrier-to-noise ratio management), even though it would introduce additional cost for those who have bought DVB-T equipment. The official switch to DVB-T2 from DVB-T began in February 2012, based on the Menkominfo decree (about 5 years from DVB-T introduction and adopting/nurturing period in Indonesia).

The Indonesian Ministry of Information & Communication Technology expects the final DVB-T2 digital television regulation to be finished in 2020 and the analogue switch off transition will begin in the same year.

Most analogue broadcasts were switched off in August 2023, with several local television stations finally broadcasting in digital on 17 August 2023.

=== Malaysia ===
Malaysia started testing DVB-T in mid 2006, but outlined plans to switch to DVB-T2 in 2011, after which tests of both were run concurrently. The DVB-T test concluded in 2016 and at the same time license to roll out DVB-T2 transmitters was contracted to Puncak Semangat Sdn. Bhd. Roll-out began in late 2016 in the Borneo states of Malaysia and has mostly concluded by mid-2017. Plans to shut off analog by mid-2018, but after the opposing party won in the 14th general election, the shutdown was postponed to mid-2019.

South and central Peninsular Malaysia has switched to fully digital TV on 30 September 2019. North and Eastern Peninsular Malaysia has also shut off analog on 14 October 2019. The rest of the country switched over on 31 October 2019.

=== Nepal ===
Currently, a private company called Prabhu TV is operating in Nepal.

=== Netherlands ===
KPN started to switch its digital terrestrial television platform Digitenne to the DVB-T2 HEVC standard in October 2018, this transition completed on 9 July 2019.

=== Palestine ===
On 5 January 2015, StarCom company switched to DVB-T2 technology which provided a better signal, reaching most regions of Palestine instead of limited signal covering (was functional only in Gaza Strip while in testing period using DVB-T).

Star TV Transponder offers a range of entertainment and sports channels system DVB-T2. The package consists of 10 channels on the UHF channel 35 (586.00 MHz).

=== Romania ===
Although Romania started DVB-T broadcasting in 2005 with the MPEG-2 standard for SD broadcast and MPEG 4 for HD, it was only experimental. In June 2011 Romania shifted to MPEG4 both for SD and HD. In 2012, the Romanian authorities decided that DVB-T2 will be the standard used for terrestrial broadcasts, as it allows a larger number of programs to be broadcast on the same multiplex. Romania's switchover plans were initially delayed due to economical and feasibility-related reasons. One of the reasons was that most Romanian consumers already extensively used either cable or satellite services, which developed very quickly and became very popular after 1990. In fact, a technological boom started around 2003, driven by a solid economical development in the field of telecommunications, made several private operators create large networks of fiber optics and cable covering all of Romania, which are now used for providing both TV, telephony, and high quality broadband internet. As the prices for complete packages (TV, internet, telephony) are low and the quality is quite good (e.g. about 20 EUR for 500 Mbit/s internet, ≈120 SD and HD digital cable TV channels and telephony, with an added 2-4 EUR for mobile telephony), the interest for over-the-air TV quickly became very low. There are rumors that commercial broadcasters that traditionally transmitted over-the-air using analogue channels (like MediaPro, Antena GROUP, Prima TV) will give up terrestrial broadcasting and will be available only on pay-TV services, like cable, satellite and IPTV. It is also rumored that the DVB-T standard (with MPEG-4 encoding) will continue until 2018.

On 17 June 2015, analogue terrestrial television was switched off, with the exception of the main public TV program (TVR1) which will continue to be broadcast strictly in the VHF band until the end of 2016.

Free-to-air DVB-T2 broadcasts on MUX1 (provided by the state-owned Radiocom) are available since June 2015 in Timișoara (UHF channel 21, 474.00 MHz), Cluj-Napoca (UHF channel 26, 514.00 MHz), Iasi (UHF channel 25, 506.00 MHz), and Bucharest (UHF channel 30, 546.00 MHz). The coverage will be extended so that at the end of 2016, over 90% of the territory will be covered. For now (2015/06/30), only five channels are broadcast on MUX1: TVR1, TVR2, TVR News, TVR 3, and TVR HD, with plans to be extended to 14-16 SD and HD programs. Radiocom's MUX2 and MUX4 implementations will also start in 2016. Legacy DVB-T broadcasts are still available in Bucharest: 6 channels can be received on channels 54 and 59, but will be shut down eventually, being replaced by DVB-T2. TVR announced that TVR News and TVR 3 will be closed, and the fate of TVR HD, is uncertain. This will lower the number of channels available on DVB-T. On 2 July 2015, Kanal D Romania left the terrestrial platform. The only broadcast that remained on terrestrial except TVR is Antena 3, but it is unknown whether it will stay on DVB-T, shift to DVB-T2 or completely leave terrestrial platform. This will lead to only 3 channels in DVB-T2, and with many TV sets that are only DVB-T compatible (most of sold models being equipped with digital cable tuner) to an unattractive terrestrial platform, and more and more people will subscribe to a cable provider, or a DTH operator in areas where there is no cable TV available.

The DVB-T transmitters were shut down on the 1st of September 2016, so only the DVB-T2 network remains on air. As of 1 October 2016, 85% of the population and 78% of the Romanian territory (as stated by the broadcaster) are covered by DVB-T2 signal. The 9 TV channels that are broadcast at the moment are produced by the national television: TVR HD + 8 SD channels TVR1, TVR2, TVR3, TVR Cluj, TVR Craiova, TVR Iasi, TVR Timișoara, TVR Tg Mures.

=== Russia ===
In September 2011, Russian governmental authorities have approved the decision that since this date all newly built terrestrial digital TV networks will use the DVB-T2 standard. In some regions of Russia DVB-T/MPEG-4 networks (mostly consisting of one multiplex) have already been deployed before this decision was made.

On 1 March 2012, "Russian Television and Radio Broadcasting Network" has started DVB-T2 broadcasting in Tatarstan. This is the first region in Russia where DVB-T2 is being used.

In January 2015, transition to DVB-T2 finished. DVB-T2 used on the whole territory of Russia. In 2019, almost all TV in Russia became digital (excluding some regional TV broadcasters).

=== Serbia ===
In May 2009, the Serbian Ministry of Telecommunications and Information Society officially announced that the DVB-T2 standard will be the national digital terrestrial broadcasting standard for both SD and HD. Serbia has become one of the first countries to commit to the DVB-T2 standard. First public test with DVB-T2 signal in Serbia was during Telfor 2009 conference in Belgrade. Analog switch off has been planned for 4 April 2012. But it was postponed to 2013. Now the final switch off is planned to finish on 1 May 2015. On 21 March 2012 JP ETV started trial DVB-T2 transmission across Serbia offering viewers a total of 10 SD channels and a HD version of the public broadcaster's channel RTS. On 14 November 2013 JP ETV has updated initial network for digital terrestrial television, and now DVB-T2 signal is available to over 90 percent of the population of Serbia.

In June 2015, the transition to DVB-T2 was finished.

=== Singapore ===
MediaCorp TV Mobile was the first channel in the world to pioneer the use of Digital Video Broadcast (DVB-T) technology to deliver television programmes to commuters in public transport such as buses, taxi etc. It was ceased transmission in 2010, a small-scale trial of DVB-T was carried on by the state-owned Mediacorp (which holds a monopoly on free-to-air broadcasting in the country) and pay television provider StarHub, Singapore announced in June 2012 that it would adopt DVB-T2 instead as its digital terrestrial television standard, determining that it was best-suited for Singapore's urban environment. By December 2013, Mediacorp had launched digital simulcasts of its channels. The analogue switchover occurred shortly after midnight on 2 January 2019.

=== South Africa ===
On 14 January 2011, the South African Department of Communication officially announced that the DVB-T2 standard will be the national digital terrestrial broadcasting standard. An analog switch-off was planned for December 2013.

=== Sri Lanka ===
With the completion of construction of Colombo's Lotus Tower which is a 350m tall broadcast and leisure tower, DVB T2 will be implemented in Sri Lanka's Colombo and other areas. Completion is set for 3Q 2015. DVB T2 is already implemented from the Kakavil transmission station by the SLRC.

=== Sweden ===
On 17 June 2010, the Swedish Radio and TV Authority and the Swedish Government granted a total of nine licenses to broadcast channels in HDTV spread over two multiplexes using DVB-T2.

Broadcasts started on 1 November 2010, with five channels available initially: SVT1 HD, SVT2 HD, MTVN HD, National Geographic HD and Canal+ Sport HD. From this date a coverage of 70% of the population is achieved, with 90% expected by mid-2011 and nationwide coverage by 2012.

=== Thailand ===
On 25 January 2013, The Royal Thai Army Radio and Television station, Channel 5, has launched a trial DVB-T2 service. The service had broadcast 6 SD channels including 2 HD channels. It has successfully completed Thailand's first DVB-T2 digital terrestrial TV trial with the help of Harris and one of its Maxiva UAX air-cooled UHF transmitters.

On 4 March 2013, Free TV channels 3, 5, 7, 9, NBT and Thai PBS received temporary permission to broadcast in digital DVB-T2 system until the official launch of Digital TV in Thailand in April 2014.

=== Ukraine ===
Ukraine's national terrestrial TV network (built and maintained by the Zeonbud company) uses the DVB-T2 standard for all four nationwide FTV (cardless CAS "Irdeto Cloaked CA") multiplexes, for both SD and HD broadcasts. Before settling for DVB-T2, Ukraine was testing both DVB-T/MPEG-2 and DVB-T/MPEG-4 options, and some experimental transmitters operating in those standards are still live. Ukraine has never had a full-fledged nationwide DVB-T network, thus not having to do a DVB-T-to-DVB-T2 migration.

Zeonbud's network consists of 167 transmitter sites, each carrying four DVB-T2 multiplexes, with transmitter power ranging from 2 kW to 50 W (all in MFN mode). As of 10 October 2011, 150 of the 167 transmitter sites have officially gone live. The biggest problem of Ukraine's DVB-T2 rollout for now is the acute shortage of inexpensive DVB-T2 set-top-boxes.

The four multiplexes carry in total 28 nationwide channels (same for all transmitter sites, distributed via satellite) and 4 local channels. Up to 8 of those 28 nationwide channels can broadcast in HD format.

As of January 2019, there are 32 channels available on the air, up from 4 channels in October 2012.

=== United Kingdom ===
On the terrestrial television system across most of the UK, there is only one multiplex (the slot corresponding to one channel in analog broadcasting and to many channels digital broadcasting) assigned to digital broadcasting in the DVB-T2 standard. This multiplex is controlled by the service company Freeview HD, which offered to host up to five DVB-T2 HD channels on it.

Freeview HD started its "technical launch" on 2 December 2009, hosting BBC HD, and ITV HD. On 30 March 2010, Freeview HD had its official launch, and added Channel 4 HD to its broadcasts. The fourth channel hosted was BBC One HD, while the fifth slot was used for a high-definition simulcast of CBBC during the daytime and a high-definition simulcast of BBC Three during the evening. The fifth HD stream on the DVB-T2 multiplex was going to be used by Channel 5 for their HD service, but they withdrew their application to Ofcom for the slot in December 2011.

In June 2012, the BBC launched a temporary stream in order to broadcast a high-definition red button service for the 2012 Olympics on Freeview, alongside BBC One HD and BBC HD. At the time, it was still undecided as to the permanent use of the 5th stream after the Olympics.

In Northern Ireland however, a second DVB-T2 multiplex was launched on 24 October 2012. This multiplex carries RTÉ One, RTÉ Two and TG4. All three channels on this multiplex are carried in SD rather than HD.

On 16 March 2013, the BBC announced that it would launch BBC News HD, BBC Three HD, BBC Four HD, CBeebies HD and CBBC HD on all digital television platforms which carry HD channels. On Freeview HD (and YouView), BBC Three HD and CBBC HD would use capacity on the BBC's existing HD multiplex covering 98.5% of UK homes; BBC News HD, BBC Four HD and CBeebies HD will use new HD capacity which will cover part of the UK and grow in coverage over time. These high-definition simulcasts are available on the second multiplex, but the second multiplex is only broadcast from selected transmitters, providing around 70% coverage across the whole of the UK.

On 26 March 2013, BBC HD was replaced by BBC Two HD.

In June 2022, it was announced that com 7 would be closing due to the license expiring and the frequency used being released for 5G. The BBC announced that they have made provisions for a 6th slot for BBC Four HD and CBeebies HD to move into available capacity that has been newly identified on the PSB3 multiplex which the BBC operates. However, BBC News HD would stop being broadcast on Freeview.

=== Vietnam ===
As of 11 November 2011, two DVB-T2 SFN networks of the Audio Visual Global JSC have been officially launched in both Hanoi and Ho Chi Minh city. Later, the same service was offered in the Mekong Delta with transmitter in Can Tho and other cities. Each network with three multiplexes carry totally 40 SD, 05 HD and 05 audio channels (MPEG-4/H264).

=== Western Asia and North Africa ===
Qatar, Saudi Arabia, UAE, Iraq, Egypt, Syria, Lebanon and Tunisia have all adopted DVB-T2. Kuwait has also committed to install the second generation standard. Iraq has already implemented its DVB-T2-based system in parts of the country, while Bahrain, Oman and Yemen are assessing the technology.

== Licensing ==
Sisvel, a Luxembourg-based company, administers the licenses for patents applying to this standard, as well as other patent pools.

== See also ==
- OFDM system comparison table
- Spectral efficiency comparison table
