= The Simple Life =

Television program

- Genre: Reality television
- Created by: Mary-Ellis Bunim; Jonathan Murray
- Starring: Paris Hilton; Nicole Richie
- Composers: Roger Neill; Michael Suby
- Country of origin: United States
- Original language: English
- No. of seasons: 5
- No. of episodes: 55 (list of episodes)

Production
- Running time: 22 minutes
- Production companies: Bunim/Murray Productions; 20th Century Fox Television

Original release
- Network: Fox
- Release: December 2, 2003 – May 12, 2005
- Network: E!
- Release: June 4, 2006 – August 5, 2007

The Simple Life is an American reality television series with a heavy element of comedy starring Paris Hilton and Nicole Richie. It depicts the two wealthy socialites, as they struggle to do jobs such as cleaning rooms, farm work, serving meals in fast-food restaurants, and working as camp counselors. The series premiered on December 2, 2003, on Fox, and concluded on August 5, 2007, on E!. A falling-out between Hilton and Richie in 2005 led the series to be cancelled by Fox following its third season. It was eventually picked up by E!, which aired its fourth and fifth seasons. The Simple Life helped catapult Hilton and Richie into international stardom, and maintained a consistently high viewership throughout its run on both networks. It also spawned a number of international remakes.

== Series overview ==
In the first season, Paris and Nicole agreed to leave behind their cellphones, credit cards and celebrity status to move in with the Leding family in Altus, Arkansas, for a month. The second season follows the two socialites traveling across the United States in a pink pickup truck (driven by Paris), pulling an airstream trailer, and participating in such activities as catching craw fish, working as maids in a nudist resort, and sausage-making. In the third season, Paris and Nicole take various internships with companies along the East Coast of the United States. For the fourth season, both women alternated in the "wife" role to a different family every episode, in a similar manner to Wife Swap. The fifth and final season follows Hilton and Richie working as counselors at Camp Shawnee.

Season	Episodes	Originally released		
Season	Episodes	First released	Last released	Network
1	8	December 2, 2003	January 26, 2004	Fox
2	11	June 16, 2004	August 4, 2004	Fox
3	16	January 25, 2005	May 12, 2005	Fox
4	10	June 4, 2006	August 13, 2006	E!
5	10	May 28, 2007	August 5, 2007	E!

== Production and broadcast ==
=== Development ===
Paris and Nicole shooting The Simple Life.

The idea for The Simple Life was generated in Fox's comedy department. Brad Johnson, Senior Vice President of comedy development, said The Simple Life was born out of a challenge from Fox Television Entertainment Group Chairman, Sandy Grushow, and News Corp. President and Chief Operating Officer, Peter Chernin, to find another way to do comedies outside of the traditional sitcom format.

"The areas that seemed simplest and cleanest was to go back to those high-concept 1960s sitcoms and say let's do them for real", Johnson said. The Simple Life was inspired by Green Acres, a sitcom about a New York society couple who moved to a farm. Johnson said they originally thought of moving an entire family to the South. Cameras would observe as the former socialites, deprived of access to their bank accounts and Beemers, attempt to get a job, buy groceries, and fit in with average Americans. At the same time the comedy department was developing the idea, Paris Hilton was meeting with the studio's casting department. Sharon Klein, senior VP of casting at the studio, said she was immediately fascinated by Hilton and wanted to do a show with her. "I'm used to meeting with actors who are putting on a facade", Klein said. "She was so real. She was funny. At that first meeting she did not come off stupid. She was in her own reality and not embarrassed to talk about it. There was a sweetness to her."

The two departments talked and realized they had their show: Send Paris Hilton and her sister Nicky, who had never worked a day in their lives, to live and work on a farm. At the time, the studio was working closely with Mike Darnell, head of reality programming at Fox, who liked the idea. "They wanted to see stilettos in cow shit," Klein said. Paris was convinced to come on board, however Nicky, being somewhat shy to the limelight at the time, opted out. Paris told some media that she was in talks to do the show by herself, but ultimately, Fox decided the city-living cast had to be a duo. Paris allegedly asked several close friends on board, including Kimberly Stewart and Band Aid heiress, Casey Johnson. After Johnson declined, Hilton ended up making the agreement with Nicole Richie.

=== Production and initial airing on Fox ===
Fox hired Bunim-Murray Productions to produce the series. The first season was filmed from April to May 2003, in Altus, Arkansas, and the 8-episode first season premiered on December 2, 2003. During its airing, Fox added two extra episodes, one of which was a reunion special. The second season was filmed from March to April 2004, and aired from June 16 to August 5, 2004, and consisted of 10 episodes (plus a television special). The special, titled The Simple Life – The Stuff We Weren't Allowed To Show You, aired on November 17, 2004. It showcased several cut scenes from the season (some of which appear on its DVD release) as well as preview clips for the third season. Filming for the third season took place from October to November 2004. It aired from January 25 to May 12, 2005, consisting of 16 episodes.

=== Fox cancellation and move to E! ===
In an interview with USA Today, Hilton confirmed the rumor that she and Nicole were no longer friends, and that Nicole would not be part of the fourth season. However, Fox Network head Peter Ligouri told the 2005 Television Critics Association press tour in Los Angeles that Paris and Nicole were actually both contracted for another two seasons, and that Paris and Nicole are, in his words "TV professionals, who will be ready to work together when the time comes." Fox ultimately canceled its plans for any further seasons of The Simple Life in October 2005, both because it had filled its mid-season show quota, and because Paris and Nicole had had the falling out as friends.

After it was dropped by Fox, other networks, such as NBC, UPN, The WB, VH1, and MTV were all reported to be interested in obtaining the rights to air new seasons of the show. On November 28, 2005, E! announced that they had picked up The Simple Life and had ordered production go ahead on the fourth season, along with the rights to re-air the first three seasons. Filming for the new season began February 27, 2006. It premiered on June 5, 2006. The fifth and final season of The Simple Life debuted on Memorial Day, on May 28, 2007, and ended on August 5, 2007.

=== Final cancellation by E! ===
On July 30, 2007, E! announced that they had canceled the show, stating: "The Simple Life has been a wonderful addition to the E! Schedule for two years and we will always be grateful to Paris and Nicole for their hard work and graciousness." That day, at the premiere of Rush Hour 3, Hilton herself said that, "It's been a great five years and we had so much fun, but I'm happy to end it at that," suggesting she had opted out of any continuation of the series. Distribution rights to The Simple Life are held by Disney-ABC Domestic Television.

== Reception ==
=== Critical response ===
Despite a significant criticism of reality television and the scrutiny that both Hilton and Richie faced throughout The Simple Life's run, the series received moderately positive reviews from critics, who generally highlighted its tongue-in-cheek humour in spite of its vacuous nature. Review aggregator Rotten Tomatoes gave the first season an approval rating of 69% based on 16 reviews. The site's critical consensus states, "The Simple Life is an incredibly vapid show, but there is no denying that Paris Hilton and Nicole Richie are downright entertaining." Writing for Variety, Brian Lowry considered that the series was "made palatable and watchable because the primary objects of derision are heiress/party girls Paris Hilton and Nicole Richie. Easy-to-promote concept plays like a light-hearted romp, where mercifully [...] nobody has learned much of anything". Ken Tucker, for Entertainment Weekly, gave the series a "B" rating and asserted that "the producers know precisely what tone to take". Seattle Post-Intelligencer editor Melanie McFarland remarked: "Hilton and Richie try to bring Beverly fabulousness, and brattiness, to the country folk. They fail miserably. We all get a good laugh. At least their unapologetic shallowness and good-natured mental incapacity carry the thing through".

=== U.S. television ratings ===
The December 2, 2003 debut of The Simple Life drew 13 million viewers, increasing Fox's adults 18-49 rating a "phenomenal" 79%. The second episode showed a growth in ratings, reaching 13.3 million viewers. An audience of 9.8 million viewers watched the series' second-season premiere on June 16, 2004. After moving to E!, the series' fourth season premiered on June 4, 2006, drawing 1.3 million viewers. While "those ratings would have been dismal for Fox, it was actually more than four times E!'s prime-time average". According to TV Week, "ratings more than tripled from the network's average" in key adult demographic groups.

=== Awards and recognition ===
Year	Association	Category	Recipient	Result
2004	ASCAP Award	Top Television Series	The Simple Life	Nominated
2004	Teen Choice Awards	Choice Reality Television Star – Female	Paris Hilton	Nominated
2004	Teen Choice Awards	Choice Television Show – Reality	The Simple Life	Nominated
2005	Teen Choice Awards	Choice Television Show – Reality	The Simple Life	Nominated
2006	Teen Choice Awards	Choice Reality Television Star – Female	Paris Hilton	Nominated
2007	Teen Choice Awards	Choice Reality Television Star – Female	Paris Hilton	Nominated
2009	Fox Reality Awards	Innovator of Reality Television	Paris Hilton	Won

== Home media ==
The Simple Life's first season received a DVD release in the United States on January 20, 2004, which included the bonus episode and the reunion episode. The second season was released to DVD on November 2, 2004, and was accompanied by a CD-soundtrack. The DVD of the third season was released in the United States on March 19, 2006. The series' first and fourth seasons were added to the iTunes Store on July 28, 2006. The fourth season was officially released to DVD on December 26, 2006. The fifth and final season's DVD was released on January 22, 2008. It contained no special features and not even the extended version of the first episode that was only shown on the premiere. This season also became available for download on iTunes, where a compilation of camp songs dubbed The Simple Life: Camp Songs was released on August 13, 2007.

== Media impact ==
=== International remakes ===
Quebec remake La Vie Rurale (The Rural Life) promo shot, with Jacynthe Millette-Bilodeau (left) and Anne-Marie Losique (right)

Paris and Nicole's rural misadventures on The Simple Life proved so popular with U.S. viewers that a number of international remakes have been produced.

Countries	Title	Starring	Network
Brazil	Simple Life: Mudando de Vida	Karina Bacchi and Ticiane Pinheiro	Rede Record
Canada (in French)	La Vie Rurale	Anne-Marie Losique and Jacynthe	MusiMax
Germany	Gülcan und Collien ziehen aufs Land	Gülcan Kamps and Collien Fernandes	ProSieben
India	Dil Jeetegi Desi Girl	Rohit Roy	Imagine TV
Italy	On the Road	Pasquale Laricchia and Victoria Pennington (season 1); Giada De Blanck and Alessia Fabiani, Mascia Ferri and Alessia Ventura (season 2); Alessandra Pierelli and Carolina Marconi, Sara Tommasi and Ludmilla Radchenko (season 3)	Italia 1
Italy	Disconnessi: On the Road	Paolo Ciavarro, Paola Di Benedetto and Giulia Salemi	Italia 1
Serbia	Jednostavan život	Ana Mihajlovski and Marijana Mićić	RTS1
Turkey	Her Şey Yolunda	Tuğba Özay and Yeliz Yeşilmen	Kanal D
Uruguay	Cambio de Vida (es)	Claudia Fernández and Tamara Venazúz	Canal 10

=== Spin-offs ===
Kelly and Kimberly shooting a spin-off to The Simple Life that was not picked up.

In 2005, NBC produced a reality series titled I Want To Be a Hilton, which took the idea of The Simple Life, and reversed it. Hosted by Kathy Hilton, Paris' mom, the show saw several contestants from rural country and suburban areas having to perform certain tasks ranging from dog grooming to a fashion show and organizing a charity event, while learning etiquette and manners. The finalist of the competition received a prize package that included a $200,000 trust fund, a new apartment, wardrobe and the opportunity to live the life of high society for one year. Paris and Nicky guest starred in an episode, and Paris's dog Tinkerbell (who appeared in The Simple Life) also took part.

A new incarnation of The Simple Life nearly occurred, in a developed spin-off that, following negotiations, was set to air on E!, featuring Kelly Osbourne and Kimberly Stewart in Paris and Nicole's shoes. However, the series was not picked up after Kelly opted out of the project following a few days' shooting, branding it "demeaning and juvenile".

=== Similar series ===
The Simple Life has also been emulated by other television productions. E!'s Filthy Rich: Cattle Drive (2005) shared various unquestionable similarities with The Simple Life, and centered on sending several well-known young socialites (including Kourtney Kardashian and Brittny Gastineau, among others) to live on a rural ranch, minus cellphones and other luxuries they have come to swear by. MTV produced Exiled! (2008), which took eight former stars of My Super Sweet 16, who have grown up spoiled, self-involved and without any idea about real work, and sent them to live in third-world countries to teach them a lesson in how hard life can be for other people.

In the United Kingdom, Channel 4 broadcast Princess Nikki (2006), a series based on the foundations of The Simple Life, starring reality television star Nikki Grahame, who rose to fame after her popularity on popular reality show Big Brother 7. This included Nikki taking on jobs such as being a farmer, an extreme cleaner and a sewage worker. South Korean television channel KBS2 has produced a reality-variety show, titled Invincible Youth (2009–2012) which is loosely based on The Simple Life, consisting of various K-pop girl group members.
