= Europa 7 HD =

Italian TV multiplex

Europa 7 HD is an Italian group of television channels aired since 11 October 2010. It is one of the first broadcasters worldwide to use DVB-T2 technology, after United Kingdom's channels BBC HD, ITV HD and Channel 4 HD.

== Legal battle ==
In Spring 2010 following a ten year legal battle, Europa 7 was assigned a national terrestrial TV frequency (or multiplex), able to cover 95% of Italy's population and 80% of the territory.

== Start of broadcasts, coverage and technology ==
Europa 7 HD began testing broadcasts in July 2010 and made its regular broadcasting debut on 11 October 2010, with the purpose of covering 80% of the population by the end of 2010. Europa 7 HD had transmitted all of its eleven channels in DVB-T2, announced as "the first broadcaster in the world to broadcast with this new technology."

E7HD has twelve channels with alternating schedules (eight HD and four SD).

== Editorial line ==
Francesco Di Stefano, the owner of Europa 7, said that the project aims to make Fly channel a politically independent channel based on freedom of information, hosting the journalists and comedians controversially censored by the other broadcasters.

== Channels ==
For strategic reasons, it changed its original 1998 plan of using its multiplex to broadcast a single analogic channel, into broadcasting twelve digital channels. Of these twelve, one called Fly channel pursues the original project of a free aired channel; the other for-pay eleven channels serve the purpose of assuring proper funding for the Fly channel.

Having a full multiplex for itself, Europa 7 HD hosts twelve alternating channels, all of them broadcast in DVB-T2. They are:

- Fly channel, a free of charge generalist Standard Definition channel, with news, satire and culture
- Five HD thematic channels based on paid subscription: Sentimental, Horror, Classic, Action and Family. These will offer movies, documentaries, concerts and international events
- Three pay-per-view HD channels offering movies most recently released on theatres.
- Three adult content channels, based on paid subscription and in Standard Definition. They air with Parental control and from 23:30 till 6:00 in the morning.
