= Penthouse TV (Canada) =

Canadian specialty TV channel for adults

- Penthouse TV logo
- Country: Canada
- Broadcast area: National
- Headquarters: Ottawa, Ontario

Programming
- Picture format: 480i (SDTV)

Ownership
- Owner: Fifth Dimension Properties
- Sister channels: Penthouse TV US; Penthouse HDTV; Exxxtasy TV; Red Hot TV; Skinemax HD

History
- Launched: July 2008

Links
- Website: Penthouse TV Canada

Penthouse TV is a Canadian English language specialty channel that broadcasts adult entertainment material, primarily in the form of pornographic films. The channel's name is licensed from the American men's magazine Penthouse. Penthouse TV is owned by Fifth Dimension Properties Inc, a company wholly owned by Stuart Duncan, majority owner of Ten Broadcasting.

== History ==
In May 2007, Fifth Dimension Properties Inc. was granted approval by the Canadian Radio-television and Telecommunications Commission (CRTC) to launch 'PENTHOUSE TV', described as "a national, English-language Category 2 specialty programming service devoted exclusively to feature driven couples-oriented adult entertainment, including both amateur and professional actors simulating amateur performances."

Penthouse TV was launched in July 2008 on Shaw Cable in a select number of markets. It was launched later by other television service providers such as Shaw Direct on September 30, 2009 and on Rogers Cable on October 15, 2009.

== Programming ==
The Canadian version of Penthouse TV plays adult-oriented movies back-to-back, 24 hours a day. Each month about 100 individual movies are aired on average of four times each. A movie from Penthouse Digital Studios is premiered every Friday night.

== See also ==
- Penthouse TV (US)
