= Playmen TV =

- Playmen TV logo
- Country: Canada
- Broadcast area: National
- Headquarters: Toronto, Ontario

Programming
- Picture format: 480i (SDTV)

Ownership
- Owner: Fifth Dimension Properties

History
- Launched: April 12, 2005
- Replaced: HARD on PrideVision (2005–2006); HARDtv (2006–2013)

Links
- Website: Playmen TV

Playmen TV is a Canadian English language specialty channel. It is a premium adult entertainment television channel aimed at gay men, with programming consisting mainly of adult films and adult-related television series. It originally launched in 2005 as a spin-off from PrideVision, leaving the channel (now known as OutTV) to focus on lifestyle and entertainment programming serving the LGBT community.

Playmen TV's licensee is 4510810 Canada Inc. which is wholly owned by Fifth Dimension Properties Inc., a company wholly owned by Stuart Duncan, majority owner of Ten Broadcasting.

== History ==
PrideVision was launched in 2001 as Canada's first digital specialty service aimed towards the LGBT community. However, PrideVision had been unattractive to providers because of the gay pornographic programming it aired during east coast late-night hours, which would be broadcast as early as 10:00 p.m. in the Pacific Time Zone. Providers chose to package PrideVision as a standalone, premium adult channel rather than alongside other mainstream specialty channels—which hampered the network's reach. Shaw also required viewers to specifically opt into the network's 'free' preview period with the authorization of a 1¢ pay-per-view fee (and commensurate authorization to bypass parental controls) to view the preview. This was different than the usual preview periods that were offered in the clear, and Shaw strung together the requirements as a response to the "overwhelming expressions of concern from our customers" over the adult content carried by the service.

PrideVision's owners filed a complaint to the CRTC alleging that Shaw was discriminating against the channel by refusing to give it a proper preview period, like other digital channels that had also recently been launched. The CRTC reprimanded Shaw for its unfair treatment of PrideVision, and ordered that the provider properly offer a preview.

In 2003, PrideVision was sold to a consortium led by veteran broadcaster William Craig. In September 2004, the ownership group filed an application with the CRTC for a new premium specialty service that would be "devoted to adult entertainment for the gay genre audience." Later in November, PrideVision re-branded its adult programming block as Hard on PrideVision, and expanded it to run from 9:00 p.m. to 6:00 a.m. ET.

In February 2005, Craig officially announced that Hard on PrideVision would be spun off as a new, 24-hour channel of the same name for gay adult programming, and PrideVision would be relaunched as OutTV. Craig argued that the changes would allow more adult programming to be made available to viewers, while allowing OutTV to achieve wider carriage and increase its investments into programming of interest to the LGBT community. Hard on PrideVision's license was approved by the CRTC on March 4, 2005.

On July 19, 2006, Shavick Entertainment, a film and television producer based in Vancouver, British Columbia, announced their intent to purchase a majority stake in Hard on PrideVision and OutTV from then majority owner William Craig. The transaction was finalized later that year, with other investors shares changing to reflect Shavick's new ownership.

In November 2006, Hard on PrideVision was renamed HardTV.

On December 3, 2009, the CRTC approved the sale of HardTV to a joint venture between Pink Triangle Press (55%) and Peace Point Entertainment (45%).

In the spring of 2013, HardTV was rebranded as Playmen TV after ownership in the company was transferred to Fifth Dimension Properties Inc. in April 2013.

== Logos ==
Same logo used when PrideVision re-branded in preparation for the launch of the 24/7 adult service

First logo of HARDtv

Second logo used as HARDtv

Third logo used as HARDtv

Fourth logo used as HARDtv
