= The Erotic Network =

American pornographic pay-per-view television network

Erotic Network logo

The Erotic Network (TEN) is a premium adult pay-per-view service in the United States owned by New Frontier Media. TEN operates six full-time PPV channels that are available via cable or satellite as well as a video on demand channel.

New Frontier Media is also the exclusive distributor of Penthouse TV and Penthouse On Demand in the United States via a multimillion-dollar deal signed in December 2007 with Penthouse Media Group.

Recently, the company started offering adult content for mobile phones.

In 2010, Australia's Network Ten incorrectly advertised their website as ten.com rather than their correct URL, ten.com.au, during a cooking program, accidentally directing viewers to TEN's website instead. Network 10 then switched their main website address to "tenplay.com.au" to both advertise their online video presence and avoid a repeat of that incident.
