= Jacynthe Millette-Bilodeau =

Canadian pop singer (born 1979)

Jacynthe
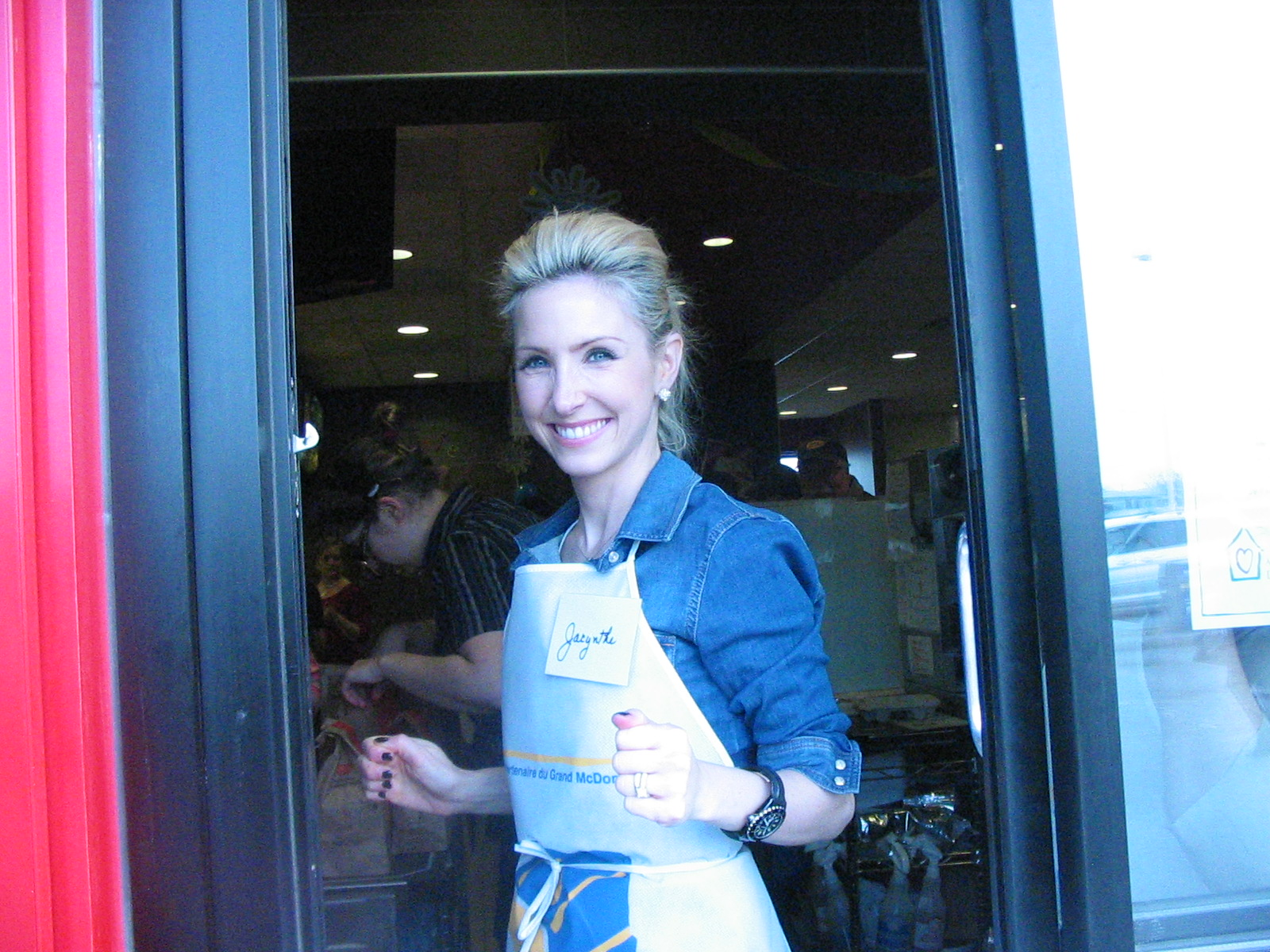

Background information
- Genres: Pop, dance, techno
- Occupations: Singer, teacher, politician
- Years active: 1996–2020 (singing); 2020–present (politics)
- Labels: KLM Records, Bertelsmann Music Group, Universal Music Canada, Whammo Records/DEP/Universal
- Website: jacynthe.ca

Jacynthe Millette-Bilodeau is a Canadian pop singer who records as Jacynthe. She records material in English, French and Italian, and has had Top 40 hits on both the anglophone and francophone pop charts in Canada. She lives in Montreal. As of 2020, she has retired her from her career in entertainment and now is an English second language teacher as well as politician in her community of Laval, Quebec.

Jacynthe is best known amongst adults for starring in the Québécois version of the reality show The Simple Life, called La Vie Rurale.

In 2011, Jacynthe released her fifth studio album, Dévoile qui tu es, her first in eight years. She is now in studio to record her follow-up English album.

In 2012, her song "Feel" featuring Victoria Duffield peaked at No. 1 on the Tops 25 Radio BDS Francophone.

In May 2021, Jacynthe was a running candidate for Quebec political faction, Action Laval running under her political campaign associate and party leader, Sophie Trottier.

== Discography ==
Album information
I Got What It Takes (1998)

No.	Title	Length
1.	"Answering Machine"
2.	"Don't Let Me Down"
3.	"One more time"
4.	"Più bella cosa"
5.	"Never"
6.	"Sweet caress"
7.	"I Got What It Takes"
8.	"Have a Party"
9.	"I want u back"
10.	"This is the night"
11.	"Give It Up"
12.	"Try my love"
13.	"Encore une fois"
14.	"Interview"
15.	"One More Time [Skee Dooo remix]"
16.	"I'll be"

- Singles:
  - "One More Time"
  - "Give It Up"
  - "Don't Let Me Down"
  - "Try My Love"
  - "This Is The Night"
Entends-tu mon cœur (2000)
- Singles:
  - "À chaque fois"
  - "Entends-tu mon cœur"
  - "Give It Up"
  - "Don't Let Me Down"
  - "Encore une fois"
  - "I'll Be"
12-25
- Singles:
  - "Vive le vent"
Seize the Day (2004)
- Singles:
  - "Look Who's Crying Now"
  - "Seize the Day"
  - "Undecided"
  - "Need You Tonight" (INXS cover)
Dévoile qui tu es
- Singles:
  - "To Be With You / L'espion" (2010)
  - "Don't Touch Those Faders / Don't Touch Those Faders (French version)" (2010)
  - "Everytime / Dévoile qui tu es, Stéréo" (2011)
