= Exxxtasy TV =

Canadian specialty TV channel

- Exxxtasy TV logo
- Country: Canada
- Broadcast area: National
- Headquarters: Ottawa, Ontario

Programming
- Picture format: 480i (SDTV); 1080i (HDTV) (as Exxxtasy HD)

Ownership
- Owner: Ten Broadcasting
- Sister channels: Penthouse TV; Red Hot TV; Skinemax HD

History
- Launched: July 2003
- Former names: Hustler TV (2003–2014)

Links
- Website: Exxxtasy TV

Exxxtasy TV is a Canadian English language exempt Category B specialty channel. It is a pay television adult entertainment television channel consisting of explicit adult material, primarily pornographic films, aimed at male audiences. The channel is owned by Ten Broadcasting, a company owned by Stuart Duncan (80.01%) and LFP Video Inc. (19.99%).

== History ==
In December 2000, TEN Broadcasting Inc. was granted approval for a television broadcasting licence by the Canadian Radio-television and Telecommunications Commission (CRTC) for a channel called TEN - Channel 1, described as "a national English-language Category 2 specialty television service devoted to adult entertainment programming, including adult entertainment films, talk shows, phone-in shows and other programming on the theme of sexuality. This will range from entertainment material to educational and analytical material on sexuality and health."

In June 2003, TEN reached a deal with Larry Flynt Publications to brand the channel under the Hustler name. It was subsequently launched in July 2003 as Hustler TV, initially on StarChoice.

It was Canada's first 24-hour subscription specialty service devoted to explicit adult content. Since that time, several other similar channels have been launched including Red Hot TV, which is also owned by Ten Broadcasting, and several other channels by various other owners. Before its launch, Playboy TV (USA) was readily available across Canada More TV @ Flivetv.com.

Logo under the brand Hustler TV

On August 30, 2013, the CRTC approved Ten Broadcasting's request to convert Hustler TV from a licensed Category B specialty service to an exempted Cat. B service.

In mid-2014, Hustler TV terminated its deal with Ten Broadcasting over an undisclosed business dispute. The channel rebranded soon afterwards as Exxxtasy TV.
