= Penthouse TV =

- Penthouse TV logo
- Country: United States
- Broadcast area: National
- Network: The Erotic Network

Programming
- Picture format: 480i (SDTV); 1080i (HDTV)

Ownership
- Owner: Penthouse Media (distributed by New Frontier Media)
- Sister channels: Penthouse TV (Canada); Penthouse HDTV

History
- Launched: December 2007

Links
- Website: Penthouse TV

Penthouse TV is an American premium adult entertainment television channel consisting of explicit adult material, primarily hardcore pornographic films and mainstream interviews. The channel's name is licensed from the men's magazine Penthouse. The channel is owned by Penthouse Media and distributed by New Frontier Media's The Erotic Network. Launched in December 2007, it was originally available only as a pay-per-view channel and video on demand service, but since mid-2011 it has been available as an a la carte monthly service, along with a high definition channel (an attempt at a 3DTV version of the network was eventually abandoned with the non-adoption of the technology).

== Slogans ==
- Adult Entertainment, Redefined
- A Higher Standard For Hardcore

== See also ==
- Penthouse TV (Canada)
