= T-VIPS =

Information technology company based in Norway

- Founded: Oslo, Norway, 2004
- Headquarters: Oslo, Norway
- Area served: Global
- Key people: Johnny Dolvik CEO
- Website: www.t-vips.com

T-VIPS is headquartered in Oslo, Norway and has a US office in Millburn, New Jersey. It was founded by 11 engineers and managers from Tandberg Television with broadcast and telecommunications industry experience. They specialises in multiplexing, processing, monitoring, switching and video broadcast over IP networks and have been involved in MPEG over IP solutions and home broadband IPTV. T-VIPS offers professional quality video solutions for Digital Terrestrial Television (DTT). Its services are utilized in terrestrial head-ends, regional and local multiplexing, service filtering, PSIP insertion, SFN and SI adaptation, disaster recovery and live events back-haul.

T-VIPS is a member of the European Broadcasting Union (EBU), the Society of Motion Picture and Television Engineers (SMPTE), the Video Services Forum (VSF) and DVB.

During IBC 2012 the merger of T-VIPS and Nevion was announced. It was completed in January 2013.

== Technologies and innovations ==
Since the company's launch, it has developed a range of solutions for video contribution over IP utilizing JPEG2000 compression and has developed solutions specifically designed for digital terrestrial television and the processing of complex transport streams.

T-VIPS products include:

- Video Gateways – a line of products designed for real time contribution and distribution of professional video over IP networks, which includes the JPEG2000 Video Gateways;
- Processing & Multiplexing – the cProcessor range is designed to simplify transport stream processing, multiplexing and redundancy handling. The range includes devices for service add/drop, component filtering, extensive PSI/SI/PSIP update and SFN operation;
- Monitoring & Switching – the range includes products for redundancy switching including seamless switching and continuous monitoring of transport streams, services, PIDs and PDI/SI/PSIP tables;
- Management solution – the solution ensures easy operation of complex broadcasting distribution networks.

== Awards ==
- 2009: Top 100 Europe, Red Herring magazine
- 2010: Number 30 fastest growing technology company on the Deloitte Technology Fast 500 EMEA
