= Skinemax HD =

- Country: Canada
- Broadcast area: Canada
- Headquarters: Ottawa, Ontario

Programming
- Picture format: 1080i (HDTV)

Ownership
- Owner: Fifth Dimension Properties
- Sister channels: Exxxtasy TV; Penthouse TV; Red Hot TV

History
- Launched: June 2013

Links
- Website: exxxtasy.com/skinemaxhd

Skinemax HD is a Canadian English language specialty channel that broadcasts pornographic films in high definition. It is owned by Fifth Dimension Properties Inc, a company wholly owned by Stuart Duncan, majority owner of Ten Broadcasting.

== History ==
In October 2012, Fifth Dimension Properties Inc. was granted approval by the Canadian Radio-television and Telecommunications Commission (CRTC) to launch "Skinemax TV", a channel described as "a national, English-language specialty Category B service devoted to adult entertainment. The service will feature programming reflecting the latest trends in themes and styles of adult programming."

The channel launched in late June 2013 on Shaw Direct, marking the first Canadian pornographic television channel to launch in HD.

On March 15, 2019, the CRTC approved Fifth Dimension Properties' request to convert Skinemax TV from a licensed Category B specialty service to an exempted Cat. B service.
