= Hustler TV (Europe) =

Adult entertainment pay television channel

- Country: United Kingdom
- Broadcast area: Europe
- Headquarters: London, United Kingdom

Programming
- Language(s): English
- Picture format: 576i (SDTV); 1080i (HDTV)

Ownership
- Owner: Sapphire Media International BV
- Sister channels: Blue Hustler

Links
- Website: hustlertv.eu

Hustler TV is a subscription based adult entertainment pay television channel distributed throughout Europe via digital cable as naxoo (in Switzerland) and satellite television. It is owned by the Dutch-based company Sapphire Media International BV.

Hustler TV and Hustler HD 3D offers hardcore pornography aimed at a straight male audience. It is the sister channel to Blue Hustler, which specializes in softcore pornography.

== See also ==
- Hustler TV (US)
- Hustler TV Canada
