= List of The Simple Life episodes =

This is a complete list of episodes of the American reality television series The Simple Life starring Paris Hilton and Nicole Richie. The series included 54 episodes and two specials that aired between December 2, 2003, and August 5, 2007, in the United States.

== Episode list ==
=== Series overview ===
| Season | Episodes | Originally released | | |
| Season | Episodes | First released | Last released | Network |
|---|---|---|---|---|
| 1 | 8 | December 2, 2003 | January 26, 2004 | Fox |
| 2 | 11 | June 16, 2004 | August 4, 2004 | Fox |
| 3 | 16 | January 25, 2005 | May 12, 2005 | Fox |
| 4 | 10 | June 4, 2006 | August 13, 2006 | E! |
| 5 | 10 | May 28, 2007 | August 5, 2007 | E! |

=== Pilot ===
| No. overall | No. in season | Title | Original release date |
|---|---|---|---|
| 0 | 0 | "Pilot" | - |
The original pilot for The Simple Life was created to introduce the premise of the show and its stars, Paris Hilton and Nicole Richie, to Fox to help persuade them to green-light the series. The pilot featured Paris and Nicole being driven via limousine, to work at a dog grooming business called Chris' K9 Clippery. Tasks assigned to the girls mainly included washing dogs, something the girls had a lot more trouble with than they thought they would. Customers on the phone got hung up on while making bookings, and dogs nearly escaped, running out the front door.

=== Season 1 (2003–04) ===
In the first season, Paris and Nicole agreed to leave behind their cellphones, credit cards and celebrity status to move in with the Leding family in Altus, Arkansas for a month. What was supposed to be an experiment in learning how to adapt to doing chores and getting their hands dirty turned out to be a failure. In the process they would ruin a dairy farmer's milk supply, wreak havoc at a local Sonic Drive-In and take advantage of an employer's credit card, ultimately getting fired from every job they took up. This was greatly upsetting to the Leding family. Despite all of this, the two would often get a reality check from the family themselves. Whether the girls took it to heart remains to be seen.

| No. overall | No. in season | Title | Original release date |
|---|---|---|---|
| 1 | 1 | "Ro-Day-O vs. Ro-Dee-O" "Bye L.A!" | December 2, 2003 |
Wealthy socialites Paris Hilton and Nicole Richie give up their lives of luxury and head to Altus, Arkansas. After being introduced to the family, the girls are shown their living quarters, including a well in the middle of their floor. They are also sent grocery shopping. The girls are expected to help with household chores and their curfew is midnight.
| 2 | 2 | "Dairy Farmin' Divas" "First Day of Work" | December 3, 2003 |
The girls have their first day of work at Danny's Dairy Farm. The girls' tasks included waking up the cows in the morning, herding the cows, milking the cows, bottling the milk, washing the barn and filling up the troughs. After an unsuccessful barbecue, the girls sneak out and drive to a club, ignoring the family rules set out for them.
| 3 | 3 | "Sonic Burger Shenanigans" "Welcome to Sonic" | December 9, 2003 |
The girls attend Saint Mary's Quilting Circle, and attempt to input their ideas into the traditional quilt making. The girls secure a new job at a fast-food restaurant called Sonic Drive-In. Showing up 45 minutes late, the girls' tasks included cooking food, serving customers and taking out trash. The girls change the marquee sign to "1/2 Price Anal Salty Weiner Bugers", and are fired soon after. Albert tells them that their actions reflect on the family. The girls then sneak out to another club.
| 4 | 4 | "The One About The Rumors" "Fair Fun" | December 16, 2003 |
The Mayor asks Paris and Nicole to be honorary co-chairpersons at the Springtime Gala, a local festival. The girls bake their own pies; however, they are eaten by the family dog. Once at the Gala, the girls spend more time drinking at the bar than participating in the festival; Mayor Post has to chase after them most of the day. They work on the kissing booth and turn it upside-down.
| 5 | 5 | "Shopaholics" "Live Stock Auction" | December 17, 2003 |
The girls secure another job, this time for a cattle auctioneer named Kent. Duties were similar to the dairy farm, and included helping herd the cattle, filling up the troughs and introducing the auctions, though Paris and Nicole preferred to flirt with the boys and decorate the cows with glitter. While at the store to buy cow feed, Nicole and Paris charge a few extra things to his account including a full-length folding mirror and a birdhouse to give to Janet Leding for Mother's Day. Kent soon finds out what they did and as punishment, he has the girls work again at the livestock auction.
| 6 | 6 | "Boy Crazy" "Fill 'Er Up" | January 7, 2004 |
The girls get a job at a gas station in the nearby town of Ozark, and make sure their boss Buffy know that it's their favorite job so far; mainly because they could spend a majority of the day checking out the boys who came in. The girls find two boys they like, Nicole liking Buffy's nephew, Anthony, and Paris liking Trae Lindley a.k.a. Chops. At a night club, Nicole ruins a pool table with bleach at the bar, when she loses her temper, after her purse is stolen.
| 7 | 7 | "Good-bye and Good Luck" "Goin' Home" | January 14, 2004 |
The first-season finale opens with Paris and Nicole being asked to leave the bar after the damage Nicole caused. Nicole apologizes the next day. The girls' time in Altus is up. After tearful goodbyes and promises to meet up again, the girls pack up all their Louis Vuitton again, stock up the taxi, and are taken back to the private jet, homeward bound.
| 8 | 8 | "The Lost Episode" | January 26, 2004 |
Added to the episode count by Fox after ratings were phenomenal, this episode compiled of never-before-seen footage featured Paris and Nicole getting a job working with a taxidermist, and managing to damage most of the stock. Paris also gets homesick and her mother sends her some of her favorite fast-food all the way from L.A.

=== Season 2: Road Trip (2004) ===
In this season, Paris and Nicole traveled across the United States in a pink pickup truck (driven by Paris), pulling an airstream trailer. They participated in such activities as catching craw fish, working as maids in a nudist resort, and sausage-making.

| No. overall | No. in season | Title | Original release date |
|---|---|---|---|
| 9 | 1 | "The Journey Begins" | June 16, 2004 |
Paris and Nicole are enjoying the last day of their vacation in South Beach, Miami. After a day of relaxing, pampering and shopping, the girls are surprised when their limousine is taken away, and in its place are a pink pick-up truck and an Airstream trailer. When it is made clear that they are to embark on a road trip adventure, and drive all the way back to Beverly Hills, again leaving behind their cellphones and credit cards, Paris and Nicole prepare to live the Simple Life again. Eventually, they stop at a toll booth and they don't have any money. They beg for people to give them money. Their first stop is The Batten family ranch, where the girls will prepare to take part in a rodeo show that evening. Paris is thrown off her horse and must be airlifted to a trauma center.
| 10 | 2 | "Mermaid Outing" | June 16, 2004 |
The girls stay the night at a trailer park for the first time in their lives. The next morning, after Paris nearly manages to lose Tinkerbell and the girls share breakfast with their neighbors, they drive into work at Weeki Wachee Springs, Florida's famous mermaid water park. The girls try their best at training to make a splash as a show mermaid and turtle. During lunch, one of the mermaid actresses asks if the girls would like to babysit her daughter Kayla for the night. Kayla disappears during a game of Hide and seek, only to thankfully appear when her parents arrive to pick her up. The next day, Paris and Nicole are disappointed when they are told they will not be able to take part in the mermaid show, despite their hard training the day before.
| 11 | 3 | "Nudist Resort" | June 23, 2004 |
Running low on money doesn't stop Paris and Nicole stopping at Burger King and ordering as much as they can. Their excuses for not being able to pay do not save them, and the girls resort to again asking random strangers for money. That night, the girls pull into another trailer park, and are surprised when a local resident informs the girls they are at a nudist colony called Caliente. The next morning, the girls realize they are the only people wearing clothes. Hired as maids for the motel area of the resort, the girls have trouble following rules and end up posing as residents and calling another maid to do a room for them, taking the credit. The girls later contribute to a body acceptance class.
| 12 | 4 | "Making Sausages" | June 30, 2004 |
Rolling on into Mississippi, the girls are welcomed to stay with the Skinner family, including a son named James with preconceived notions of how the girls will be before they even arrive. James manages to offend Nicole so much that she lashes out at him. Later during the day, he also manages to ruin Nicole's hair extensions, causing her and Paris to go out clubbing rather than join the family for dinner. The Skinners find work for the two at Rene's, a local butcher. The girls are shown how to make sausages but make more mess than sausages. The girls also make a special sausage filled with dog food just for James.
| 13 | 5 | "Jenny's First Date" | July 7, 2004 |
The Louisiana swamps are the next location, staying with the Mequet family, including a teenage daughter named Jenny. Jenny is planning her first date, and Paris and Nicole are delighted when they are invited to take her shopping for an outfit. Given the family credit card, and a limit of $75, unfortunately, the girls are not small-spenders, bringing a grand total of their spree to $489.76. The girls' job will be to catch several full sacks of crawfish, much to their disgust, and of course, they catch only a small amount of what was expected. That night during a barbecue, Paris manages to steal several pounds of cooked crawfish and take them home in a purse. The next day, the girls plan to use the cooked crawfish in place for crawfish they actually caught themselves.
| 14 | 6 | "Dancing Sheep" | July 14, 2004 |
The girls are in Texas and learning how to misuse their truck radio, before arriving at the Lutz-Carillo family farm. The girls are there to help as farm-hands, but find the family unusual in more ways than one. Quickly enough, they decide to drive away, with two of the Lutz-Carillo sons. They return home for dinner, and continue to be estranged by the weirdness of the family. Despite this, they take the boys out, but find there isn't much to do in town, and the local girls aren't very interesting. The next day, the girls finally get to work, including feeding the chickens and sheep. The girls finish up for the day, and drive off with the extension cord still plugged into the trailer, dragging along the road behind them.
| 15 | 7 | "Play Ball" | July 21, 2004 |
The girls stay with the devout Christian Cash family for a night. Adjusting to their "no profanity" rule isn't easy. The next day they go to work for a Minor League baseball team called the Round Rock Express at the Dell Diamond. The girls' tasks included helping the team train in the morning, but Nicole preferred to mess around and flirt with the players. That night during the game, Paris and Nicole start off by helping at the canteen and then later they go to the game. They flirted with the players and let their dogs run all around the field, much to the annoyance of the fans trying to enjoy the game. Honeychild, one of Nicole's dogs, poops on the baseball field. Eventually as the spectators get more hostile, the girls run back to the truck and drive off.
| 16 | 8 | "Brand New Look" | July 28, 2004 |
They stay with the Bahm family: a biker couple with a 14-year-old son named Tyler. The next day, the girls get jobs at Lonny's Beauty Salon. The girls' first task was a back wax for a rather sensitive man. The girls then give a woman an unusual make-over, with her after arguably appearing worse than her before. Despite the obvious problems, their boss Jesse still pays them and welcomes them back anytime.
| 17 | 9 | "Deputized" | August 4, 2004 |
The girls come to stay at the Click Ranch. The girls decide they're going to try to help rekindle the romance of the Clicks and decide to help plan a romantic dinner for them. The next days the girls get jobs as deputy sheriffs. Their first task is to serve lunch to the prisoners in the jail, in which Nicole can't help but flirt. Later, when given a patrol car, they naturally abuse their position, constantly citing people for fake offenses.
| 18 | 10 | "Back in the Saddle" | August 4, 2004 |
They are dropped off at the YO Ranch. The girls agree to work on the ranch, and help herd the cattle three miles down the road to where they will be collected. Paris overcomes her fear of horses following her accident earlier in the season. The girls show their care for animals by refusing to brand the cattle with hot pokers, preferring to draw on the cattle with their make-up. When the girls discover the cattle will be slaughtered, they vow to protect a favored cow the girls named Bill, offering their pay plus interest.

=== Season 3: Interns (2005) ===
The third season, subtitled Interns, would see Paris and Nicole take various internships with companies along the East Coast of the United States. The girls traveled around the northeast United States via the Greyhound Bus company's publicly available bus routes. But unlike season 2, this time around the girls did not have a swanky home on wheels and instead were travelling around the northeast in a regular Greyhound bus that was also ferrying normal members of the public that are travelling to the same destination.

| No. overall | No. in season | Title | Original release date |
|---|---|---|---|
| 19 | 1 | "Mechanics" | January 26, 2005 |
The bus pulls up in Bayonne, New Jersey, where they are welcomed by the Brower family. The girls get to know the Browers, as Joyce, mother of the family, informs the girls that her dog recently died. Paris decides they should get her a new dog to cheer her up. The next day the girls begin their first internship at an auto repair shop. At first they mainly do a good job at everything they're asked to do. When asked to drive a police car into the garage, the girls instead drive off to a mini-mall to buy beauty supplies. They are given a hefty warning. Of course, the girls manage to mess it up again, crashing two customers' cars.
| 20 | 2 | "Secretaries" | January 26, 2005 |
After getting to know the family a bit, they are dropped off in the city at Kirshenbaum, Bond and Partners Advertising for their next internship. The girls' first assignment is sorting the mail and putting them in the appropriate mailboxes. The girls then attempt being the senior partners' PA's, with varying degrees of success. The girls cater; picking up lunch for their co-workers from the sandwich bar across the street. Deciding they are hungry, they eat the food intended for their co-workers. They are then assigned to using the Xerox, but manage to even mess this up.
| 21 | 3 | "Airline" | February 9, 2005 |
At their new airline jobs, Nicole and Paris hurl baggage, empty an airplane lavatory and speed around on a luggage truck. Back at their hosts' home, they try to patch up a teenage romance gone awry and try to rescue Nicole's dog from the family cat.
| 22 | 4 | "Mortuary" | February 16, 2005 |
While helping their chain-smoking New Jersey hosts kick the habit, Paris and Nicole take up employment at a funeral home. They blast loud music, make a hot chocolate run while transporting a coffin, and spill a person's ashes all over the ground.
| 23 | 5 | "Plastic Surgery" | February 23, 2005 |
During their new jobs assisting at a plastic surgery office, the girls are grossed out by the procedures. They later take the host family out to a drag show and leave an impression on the mother.
| 24 | 6 | "Broadcasting" | March 2, 2005 |
At WBFF-TV Baltimore, interns Paris and Nicole write a good anti-smoking PSA and a bogus weather forecast. Then, viewers start calling the station for dates with the local weatherman after Paris announces on-camera that he's on the list on "50 Hottest Singles".
| 25 | 7 | "Daycare" | March 9, 2005 |
Changing diapers at a daycare center in Delaware, Paris and Nicole also decorate an area and make it into a bedroom for a child who does not have one and has been forced to sleep on the floor. Nicole takes more naps than the kids.
| 26 | 8 | "Zoo" | March 16, 2005 |
When Paris and Nicole intern at a Baltimore zoo, the girls discover they both have true animal instincts. Meanwhile, the girls plan a romantic date for their new host parents in an effort to rekindle their flame after 20 years of marriage. Nicole gets a visit from her boyfriend at the time.
| 27 | 9 | "Bakery" | March 23, 2005 |
When the girls intern at the Gourmet Bakery, they stir up a whole lot of trouble making desserts. They spill things all over the floor and mess up treats, and get punished. Also Paris cooks dinner for the family she is staying with.
| 28 | 10 | "Psychic" | March 30, 2005 |
As interns at an Astrology Shop in Washington, D.C., the girls perform "butt readings" and make male patrons strip to their underwear. Later, they set up a date between Mrs. Footes’s widowed mother and a nice neighbor. They did not receive any money for this job because they were fired.
| 29 | 11 | "Nursing Home" | April 6, 2005 |
Paris and Nicole intern at a retirement home and although they fail at cooking and cleaning, they make up for it by adding their own twist to the seniors' activity calendar. They also convince head-of-household Chuck to stop hunting by pelting him with paintballs. They then call the police to arrest him for hunting.
| 30 | 12 | "Ad Agency" | April 13, 2005 |
The girls are now in Miami where Paris and Nicole intern at an advertising agency and their new host family, the Jacobs, have baby orangutans Pumpkin and Peanut. And Paris & Nicole have to create a new ad for Burger King, and they decide to use the orangutans. They also work at a local Burger King and talk to customers about ideas for their ad.
| 31 | 13 | "Firefighters" | April 20, 2005 |
The girls are now in Atlantic City, where they heat things up when they intern as firefighters. They convince firemen to pose for a sexy calendar, and blow off their training. They attend a real 911 emergency. Then, concerned about a little girl with no friends, they mount a campaign to find her a friend. They did not receive any money for this job, all they got were "retired firemen badges."
| 32 | 14 | "Manufacturing" | April 28, 2005 |
At their hard jobs at a manufacturing plant, the girls relieve boredom by holding office chair races, dancing, and wrapping themselves in bubble wrap, and their mean boss is not amused. The girls thought the 3 boys were handsome. As a result they teach their host families' 3 young boys how to pick up girls while bowling in which they were not allowed to leave the house.
| 33 | 15 | "Wedding Planner" | May 12, 2005 |
Paris and Nicole try their hand as wedding planners at the Dearly Beloved Wedding Chapel in Nashville. Trouble starts when the girls oversleep and leave the nervous bride biting her nails at the altar. They also set up their single host mother (whose daughter is future pop singer Kesha) with a date. The girls also customize a cake. When they go in the church, the heads of the cake fall on the floor. When they get their report, they get an F. Before their average grade was a C−.
| 34 | 16 | "Dentistry" | May 12, 2005 |
The girls' last stop is Tennessee, where they fall into the hands of an overly-chipper motivational speaker and beauty queen coach. So this diva convinces Paris to enter the local pageant. Meanwhile, their last internship is at a dentist's office where Paris and Nicole must drill. But instead, they slap patients, put make-up on them, and make prank calls. Paris and Nicole end their journey with a welcome-home party in New York.

=== Season 4: 'Till Death Do Us Part (2006) ===
The season features Paris and Nicole playing "Wife" to a different family every episode, in a similar manner to Wife Swap. The girls alternate between the family each episode, with the family then deciding which of them was better in the role. This season was also unique, as Paris and Nicole did not leave L.A. The families they stayed with were L.A. area residents, and the episodes often focused on Paris and Nicole's personal lives and careers as well as the challenge of being a wife and mother. This season also featured guest appearances from the girls' well-known friends, family and associates. Since the season was set in their hometowns, the girls had cell phone and credit card usage, previously denied to them in earlier seasons.

| No. overall | No. in season | Title | Original release date |
|---|---|---|---|
| 35 | 1 | "The Nolan Family" | June 4, 2006 |
Paris and Nicole are no longer friends so they each visit families at different times and replace the mother of the family. The girls strap on 35-pound pregnancy suits and take the place of a nine-month-pregnant stay-at-home wife. Shopping and parties are out of the question as Paris and Nicole struggle to clean house, raise a three-year-old, survive Lamaze class, and hit the strip clubs. When Nicole takes Mr. Nolan to a nudie joint, Mrs. Nolan's hormones go through the roof. As a result, she chose Paris instead of Nicole to watch her give birth to the child although Paris got grossed out and threw up during the child birth video. The husband picks Paris as the better housewife.
| 36 | 2 | "The Ghauri Family" | June 11, 2006 |
Paris and Nicole trade in their designer dresses for traditional shalwar qameez when they take over the responsibilities of a traditional Pakistani mother. With the patient help of the family husband and Americanized 15-year-old son, the girls manage to dress, speak and dance like conservative Pakistani housewives...or at least their version of it. But things don't go as well when Paris and Nicole decide to share their experiences, namely how they like to party. Kim Kardashian is featured.
| 37 | 3 | "The Weekes Family" | June 18, 2006 |
Paris and Nicole fill in for a housewife who is desperate to keep the spark alive in her 12-year marriage. The girls' "husband for a day" bends over backward as he tries to teach them how a relationship works, but commitment just doesn't come easily for Paris and Nicole. To show this couple how they would keep the spark alive, Paris gets wild 'n' wet on a golf course, and Nicole brings blindfolds, tequila and an erotic photo shoot into the mix. It's safe to say this host couple may never be the same. The husband chooses Nicole as the better wife.
| 38 | 4 | "The Padilla Family" | June 25, 2006 |
Paris and Nicole test their maternal instincts by playing mother to four rambunctious siblings. The girls try their best to feed, entertain and teach the children, but they're outnumbered. These kids are full of needs, energy and questions. After a matter of minutes, Paris and Nicole have had it up to their hair extensions, so they opt for some nontraditional parenting techniques—just to make it through the day alive.
| 39 | 5 | "The Bowden Family" | July 9, 2006 |
The plan is for Paris and Nicole to learn about raising two teenage girls, but that all changes when they discover the girls' mothers have never married. Always on board for love, Nicole ditches her household duties and starts planning a surprise commitment ceremony. Not to be outdone by her ex-best friend, Paris plots to throw an even bigger bash--and the rush to the altar is on. They choose Paris' wedding as their favourite.
| 40 | 6 | "The Murrie Family" | July 16, 2006 |
Paris and Nicole fast-forward their biological clocks and become instant mothers to an infant and his five-year-old brother. Both girls suffer major misadventures in breast-feeding, baby-bathing and diaper-changing. It is also baby's first birthday, and the ex-best friends are supposed to work together to pull off the party. This turns out to be difficult, since Paris and Nicole are not on speaking terms.
| 41 | 7 | "The Contreras Family" | July 23, 2006 |
The single father has always dreamed of taking his boys out for a weekend in the wilderness, but Paris and Nicole's ideas of "roughing it" are not what he had in mind. Undeterred, the girls pull out all the stops to make this camping trip one the family will never forget. Paris brings them to a Hilton hotel room which she has transformed to look like a campsite, she even hires bear cubs to make it look more realistic, Nicole actually takes the boys camping and orders pizza, which is delivered by helicopter, she takes them on a tour of LA in the helicopter. In a heartbreaking scene at the end, Mr. Contreras' five-year-old son cries as Nicole leaves.
| 42 | 8 | "The Beggs Family" | July 30, 2006 |
Paris and Nicole go domestic when they substitute for a housewife with a messy home. The girls get down and dirty doing laundry, mopping, dusting and mowing the lawn—all in high heels. Needless to say, the results are disastrous. Exhausted, Nicole takes her new family to Beverly Hills for a makeover, while Paris channels her inner Martha Stewart and throws together a last-minute dinner party. The husband chooses Paris as the best housewife and mother.
| 43 | 9 | "The Burton Family" | August 6, 2006 |
New age family values are put to the test as Paris and Nicole visit a family of five with a strong interest in the arts. Music appreciation, finger painting and sculpture classes all go relatively smoothly—until Nicole produces an R-rated rap and Paris directs a cross-dressing video. After their run-in with Paris and Nicole, the Burtons give some serious thought to good old-fashioned censorship.
| 44 | 10 | "The Confrontation" | August 13, 2006 |
In the fourth season finale, The Siegels, two still energetic lovebirds who have been married 64 years, get the shock of a lifetime when Paris and Nicole drop in. The day goes awry from the start when Paris sends a double in her place, on the wrong day. The Paris look-alike Natalie Reid and Nicole end up at the Siegals' home at the same time, so Nicole tries to take advantage of the situation by orchestrating a press conference to humiliate Paris. Not to be outdone, the real Miss Hilton gets wind of the mischief and shows up at the Siegals' residence, ready for a showdown.

=== Season 5: Goes to Camp (2007) ===
In the season opener, Paris and Nicole make-up on Nicole's birthday. This season has Paris and Nicole working as counselors at Camp Shawnee. The camp will be host to five different speciality groups: Wellness Camp, Pageant Camp, Couples Camp, Survival Camp and Drama Camp. With two episodes focused on one specialty groups. The girls have cell phones although there is no cell service. They don't have credit card usage again so it is more like seasons 1-3 than 4.

| No. overall | No. in season | Title | Original release date |
|---|---|---|---|
| 45 | 1 | "Welcome to Camp Shawnee" | May 28, 2007 |
In the season opener, Paris and Nicole make peace. They then move into Camp Shawnee to become counselors. After moving in and performing tasks around the camp, such as cleaning dishes, doing the camp announcements, and cleaning the bathrooms, Paris and Nicole meet their first set of campers. They are people who are struggling with their weight and came for a Wellness Camp. The girls first take all the snack food the campers have and lock it in a refrigerator. Then, Paris and Nicole have to give all the campers enemas, which takes all day. The girls then attempt to steal food from the locked refrigerator which angers camp leader Ed.
| 46 | 2 | "Big Primpin" | June 3, 2007 |
Paris and Nicole use their own idea of exercise to help campers get in shape; a male counselor tries to impress Paris.
| 47 | 3 | "Pageant Girls Just Want to Have Fun" | June 10, 2007 |
Paris and Nicole counsel a group of young women and their mothers on how to be a pageant winner.
| 48 | 4 | "Showstoppers" | June 17, 2007 |
Paris and Nicole prepare the campers and their mothers for the pageant.
| 49 | 5 | "Flirting with Disaster" | June 24, 2007 |
The couples therapy begins and Paris and Nicole have to counsel them. Paris and Hunter's relationship takes a turn.
| 50 | 6 | "Committed" | July 1, 2007 |
Paris and Nicole usher the couples through a recommitment ceremony and deal with their own issues with love.
| 51 | 7 | "Say Hello to Myke Hawke" | July 8, 2007 |
Paris and Nicole learn what it takes to really rough it in the wilderness when they become counselors at a Survivalist Training Camp.
| 52 | 8 | "Babes in the Woods" | July 22, 2007 |
Paris and Nicole get lost in the woods.
| 53 | 9 | "Almost Fame-less" | July 29, 2007 |
Acting camp begins and the girls meet the temperamental Sally Kirkland.
| 54 | 10 | "Hollywood Ending" | August 5, 2007 |
Paris and Nicole put on a musical about their friendship in the series finale.

=== Specials ===
| Title | Original release date |
|---|---|
| "The Reunion" | January 14, 2004 |
Hosted by Leeza Gibbons, this talk show-styled episode, complete with studio audience, featured Paris, Nicole and the Ledings being interviewed about their reflections of the show and how it turned out. Also showcased were many scenes cut from the season, as well as the girls showing their appreciation for the Ledings by buying them a brand-new car.
| "The Simple Life 2: Road Trip: The Stuff We Weren't Allowed to Show You" | November 17, 2004 |
This special showcased several deleted scenes from the season (some of which appear on the season 2 DVD), new interviews with the families and bosses from the season, and preview clips for the third season.

== Home media releases ==
| Season Title | DVD release date | |
| Season Title | Region 1 | Discs |
|---|---|---|
| The Simple Life | January 20, 2004 | 1 (2 in Region 2) |
| The Simple Life 2: Road Trip | November 2, 2004 | 1 |
| The Simple Life 3: Interns | March 14, 2006 | 1 (2 in Region 2) |
| The Simple Life 4: 'Til Death Do Us Part | December 26, 2006 | 1 (2 in Region 2) |
| The Simple Life 5: Goes To Camp | January 22, 2008 | 1 |
