= Dorcel TV Canada =

Canadian adult pay TV channel

- Dorcel TV logo
- Country: Canada
- Broadcast area: National
- Headquarters: Montreal, Quebec

Programming
- Language(s): English, French
- Picture format: 480i (SDTV); 1080i (HDTV)

Ownership
- Owner: Image Diffusion International (Sex-Shop Television Inc.)
- Sister channels: Dorcel TV Canada (French); Vixen TV

History
- Launched: October 28, 2010 (French); March 13, 2013 (English)
- Former names: Vanessa (2010-2014); Vivid TV (2014-2018)

Links
- Website: Dorcel TV (in French)

Dorcel TV is a Canadian premium adult entertainment television channel consisting of primarily softcore adult content in the form of films, documentaries, reality shows, and variety shows, among others, between 6:00am to 11:00pm ET, while hardcore content, primarily from Dorcel TV, fills the remainder of the schedule. It is offered in English and French. The channel is owned by Sex-Shop Television Inc., a division of IDI.

== History ==
In December 2007, Sex-Shop Television Inc. was granted approval by the Canadian Radio-television and Telecommunications Commission (CRTC) to launch Vanessa, described as "a national French-language Category 2 pay television programming service devoted to the themes of sex appeal, sensuality, eroticism and sexuality." In March 2009, Sex-Shop Television Inc. then obtained approval to launch an English-language service of the same type and name.

A French-language version of Vanessa initially launched on October 28, 2010; Vanessa was added by Bell Satellite TV to its lineup one week later, giving the channel national distribution. An English version was expected to launch the following year; however, it did not launch as planned.

In October 2012, Sex-Shop Television was given approval from the CRTC to convert the French Vanessa into a bilingual service due to Sex-Shop Television citing difficulties launching a fully dedicated English channel, it appeared as though plans to launch an English service were scrapped. However, on March 11, 2013, Sex-Shop Television announced that an English-language channel was launching on March 13, 2013. The channel was revealed to have launched on Vidéotron.

High definition (HD) feeds of the English- and French-language services launched in September 2014 on MTS TV and Telus's Optik TV in Quebec.

Vivid TV Canada logo

In September 2014, Sex-Shop Television reached a licensing deal with the American adult entertainment company Vivid Entertainment, which saw Vanessa re-brand as VividTV on October 28, 2014, and gain access to its library. Half of the network's programming was to come from Vivid, with the remainder from Vanessa's existing productions.

On September 1, 2018, both the English and French versions of the channel were rebranded Dorcel TV Canada.
