= Ten Broadcasting =

Canadian broadcasting company specializing in adult programming

Ten Broadcasting Inc.
- Company type: Private company
- Industry: Media
- Founded: 2001
- Headquarters: Ottawa, Ontario, Canada
- Key people: Stuart Duncan, President & CEO
- Products: Broadcasting, Television Production
- Owner: Stuart Duncan (80.01%); LFP Video Inc. (19.99%)
- Website: www.tenbroadcasting.com

Ten Broadcasting Inc. (also referred to as X Broadcasting) is a privately held Canadian broadcasting and production company based in Ottawa, Ontario. The company primarily operates adult entertainment channels.

== Operated channels ==
- Exxxtasy TV
- Penthouse TV
- Playmen TV
- Red Hot TV
- Skinemax HD
