= Red Hot TV (Canadian TV channel) =

- Red Hot TV logo
- Country: Canada
- Broadcast area: National
- Headquarters: Ottawa, Ontario

Programming
- Picture format: 480i (SDTV)

Ownership
- Owner: Ten Broadcasting
- Sister channels: Exxxtasy TV; Penthouse TV; Skinemax HD

History
- Launched: December 1, 2003
- Former names: X Channel (2003–2006); Red Light District TV (2006–2008)

Links
- Website: Red Hot TV

Red Hot TV is a Canadian English language Category B specialty channel that broadcasts adult entertainment material, primarily consisting of pornographic films, with a focus on couples-oriented programming sourced from various adult film studios including original Canadian content. The channel is owned by Ten Broadcasting, a company owned by Stuart Duncan (80.01%) and LFP Video Inc. (19.99%).

== History ==
In December 2000, Ten Broadcasting Inc. was granted approval by the Canadian Radio-television and Telecommunications Commission (CRTC) to launch a television channel called TEN – Channel 2, described as "a national English-language Category 2 specialty television service devoted to adult entertainment programming, including adult entertainment films, talk shows, phone-in shows and other programming on the theme of sexuality."

The channel was launched on December 1, 2003 on Rogers Cable as X Channel. In 2006, the channel was renamed Red Light District TV. The channel was once again renamed, this time on August 1, 2008 as Red Hot TV.

== Theme nights ==
- Monday: Red Hot Gone Wild
- Tuesday Nights: Foreign Nights
- Wednesday Nights: Amateur Nights
- Thursday Nights: Titty Nights
- Red Hot Fridays
- Sunday Nights: Red Hot Classics

== Slogans ==
- On weekday To Now Up Is Hot
- "Turn Up The Heat"
- "Life is Red Hot"

== Logos ==
2003 - 2006

2006 - 2008

2008–present
