= Hustler TV (American TV channel) =

American semi-hardcore pornographic pay-per-view television service

- Country: United States
- Broadcast area: Nationwide

Ownership
- Owner: LFP Broadcasting
- Sister channels: Hustler TV Canada; Hustler TV Europe; Blue Hustler

History
- Launched: October 1, 2004

Links
- Website: www.hustlertv.com

Hustler TV is an American semi-hardcore pornographic premium television channel available through satellite, video on demand and digital cable. The channel offers explicit adult material, uncut and uncensored from Hustler. The channel is owned by LFP Broadcasting.

== See also ==
- Hustler TV Canada
- Hustler TV (Europe)
- Blue Hustler
