= Vixen TV =

Canadian pay TV channel

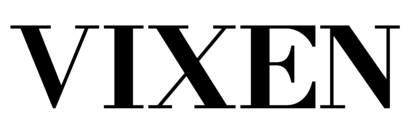
- Country: Canada
- Broadcast area: National
- Network: Vanessa Media
- Headquarters: Montreal, Quebec

History
- Launched: March 23, 2017
- Founder: Anne-Marie Losique
- Former names: Hustler TV Canada (2017-2021)

Links
- Webcast: Live TV

Vixen TV is a Canadian pay television channel that consists of primarily pornographic films aimed at heterosexual men. The channel is owned by Vanessa Media. The channel's brand and much of its content is licensed and purchased, respectively, from Vixen Media Group.

== History ==
On February 27, 2017, Vanessa Media, owners of existing Canadian pornographic channels, Vivid TV in English and French (now known as Dorcel TV), announced that it had reached an agreement with LFP Broadcasting to launch a branded Hustler TV channel in Canada as both a linear television channel and as a subscription video on demand service. The launch date was expected to be March 21, 2017; however, it was confirmed via Vanessa Media's founder and CEO, Anne-Marie Losique's social media accounts, that the channel launched on March 23, 2017, as Hustler TV Canada. in standard definition.

Logo as Hustler TV Canada

The channel launched in high definition in January 2018, when both the standard and high-definition feeds launched on Maskatel in Quebec.

Prior to Vanessa Media and LFP Broadcasting announcing the launch of its Hustler TV-branded channel in Canada, a previous incarnation of Hustler TV existed in Canada from 2003 to 2014, under the ownership of Ten Broadcasting and LFP Broadcasting. In 2014, LFP Broadcasting sold its interest in the channel to Ten Broadcasting, who in turn rebranded the channel as Exxxtasy TV.

On October 21, 2020, Anne-Marie Losique announced via social media that she would be launching a new channel called Vixen TV on February 18, 2021. The channel's launch would coincide with the launch of the first Vixen TV branded channel in other markets around the world, including Europe and the United States, which is a partnership with Vixen Media Group and Dorcel, which was announced in 2020. It would be revealed later that the new Vixen TV channel in Canada would be a rebranding of the Hustler TV Canada channel.
