= Index of prostitute articles =

Index of Wikipedia articles about individual prostitutes.

== A ==
- Sada Abe
- Patoo Abraham
- Elizabeth Adams (madam)
- Saint Afra
- Air Force Amy
- Josephine Airey
- Brenda Allen
- Norma Jean Almodovar
- Anita Alvarado
- Lily Argent
- Josie Arlington
- Nina Arsenault
- Mickey Avalon

== B ==
- Wendy Babcock
- Dorothy Baker (madam)
- Revelle Balmain
- Trisha Baptie
- Candy Barr
- Fernande Barrey
- Jeanne de Bellem
- Richard Berkowitz
- Diamond Bessie
- Big Nose Kate
- Valtesse de La Bigne
- Madeline Blair
- Mattie Blaylock
- Blonde Dolly
- Scotty Bowers
- Gary Ray Bowles
- Sarah A. Bowman
- Shirley Brifman
- Brandi Britton
- Carrie Brown
- Julia Brown
- Susannah Buckler
- Julia Bulette

== C ==
- Nellie Cameron
- Eylül Cansın
- Betty Careless
- Caridad la Negra
- Hannah Chaplin
- Annie Chapman
- Deborah Churchill
- Sylvia Clevenger
- Monica Coghlan
- Elizabeth Cresswell
- Lisa Crystal Carver
- Andrew Cunanan
- Lizzie Cyr
- The Countess (trans woman)

== D ==
- Kimberly Daniels
- Binodini Dasi
- Anette Dawn
- Zahia Dehar
- Vanessa de Oliveira
- Honeysuckle Divine
- Issan Dorsey
- Phoebe Doty
- Dora DuFran
- Ashley Alexandra Dupré

== E ==
- Catherine Eddowes
- Pearl Elliott
- Schwesta Ewa
- Els von Eystett

== F ==
- Christiane F.
- Margaret Fernseed
- Robyn Few
- Alexis Fire
- Albert Fish
- Florrie Fisher
- Heidi Fleiss
- Marthe de Florian
- Ali Forney
- Priss Fotheringham
- Denham Fouts

== G ==
- Ronnie Lee Gardner
- Elisabeth Gassner
- Jean Genet
- Geske
- Sakineh Ghasemi
- Jody Gibson
- Billi Gordon
- Raymond Gravel
- Mary Ann Greaves

== H ==
- Kim Hak-sun
- Maggie Hall
- Lin Hei'er
- Fred Halsted
- Gerald Hannon
- Catherine Healy (activist)
- Toni Jo Henry
- Richard Holcomb
- Xaviera Hollander
- Amber L. Hollibaugh
- Jason Holliday
- Kim Hollingsworth
- John Holmes (actor)
- Sallie-Anne Huckstepp

== J ==
- Calamity Jane
- Rebecca Jarrett
- Helen Jewett
- Dean Johnson (entertainer)
- Mollie Johnson
- Constantia Jones
- Mary Jones (trans woman)

== K ==
- Hande Kader
- Kanhopatra
- Mary Jane Kelly
- Alika Kinan
- Moll King

== L ==
- La Macorina
- Robert La Tourneaux
- Yvette Laclé
- Caroline Lacroix
- Vicky de Lambray
- Hanna Lakomy
- Laura Lee (sex worker)
- Carol Leigh
- Kitty Leroy
- Maxi Linder
- Alice Little
- Sally Lodge
- Beatriz Zamora López
- Crazy Lou
- Molly Luft
- Catherine Lynch
- Bente Lyon

== M ==
- Brooke Magnanti
- Luka Magnotta
- Rosa May
- Maheeda
- Dulcie Markham
- Chicago May
- Jamila M'Barek
- Fillide Melandroni
- Morgane Merteuil
- Adeline Miller
- Della Moore
- Vicki Morgan
- Mother Featherlegs
- Marie Jonas de la Motte
- Gerda Munsinger
- Suzanne Muzard

== N ==
- Tímea Nagy (activist)
- Lâm Uyển Nhi
- Mary Ann Nichols
- Domenica Niehoff
- Rosemarie Nitribitt

== O ==
- Jean O'Hara

== P ==
- Damaris Page
- Maria Pantazi
- Barbara Payton
- Louise Peete
- Bridget Perrier
- Kath Pettingill
- Willie Piazza
- Fannie Porter
- Zofia Potocka
- Anna Pulitzer

== Q ==
- Tracy Quan

== R ==
- Danguolė Rasalaitė
- Jurjentje Aukes Rauwerda
- Grisélidis Réal
- Mima Renard
- Elena Reynaga
- Marthe Richard
- Selina Rushbrook
- John/Eleanor Rykener

== S ==
- Sally Salisbury
- Jacopo Saltarelli
- John Saul (prostitute)
- Shalimar Seiuli
- Aiden Shaw
- Ching Shih
- Mattie Silks
- Emma Elizabeth Smith
- Anna Smitshuizen
- Valerie Solanas
- Almeda Sperry
- Sharleen Spiteri (sex worker)
- Annie Sprinkle
- Nancy Spungen
- Lindi St Clair
- Margo St. James
- Pearl Starr
- David Henry Sterry
- Star Stowe
- Støvlet-Cathrine
- Elizabeth Stride
- Bruna Surfistinha

== T ==
- Martha Tabram
- Tulasa Thapa
- Nikki Thomas
- Sunset Thomas
- Estella Marie Thompson
- Libby Thompson
- Ah Toy
- Mary Ellen Tracy
- Tiger Tyson

== U ==
- Andressa Urach

== V ==
- Carla van Raay
- María José la Valenciana
- Adriana Valkenburg
- Pearl de Vere
- Rétaux de Villette
- Sheila Vogel-Coupe

== W ==
- Yamada Waka
- Rosemary West
- Sheila White (abolitionist)
- Zara Whites
- Anna Wilson (madam)
- Helen Wood (television personality)
- Louise Wooster
- Aileen Wuornos

== X ==
- Venus Xtravaganza

== Z ==
- Du Zhu
