= List of prostitutes and courtesans =

This list of prostitutes and courtesans includes famous persons who have engaged in prostitution and courtesan work.

== Historical ==
=== Ancient world ===
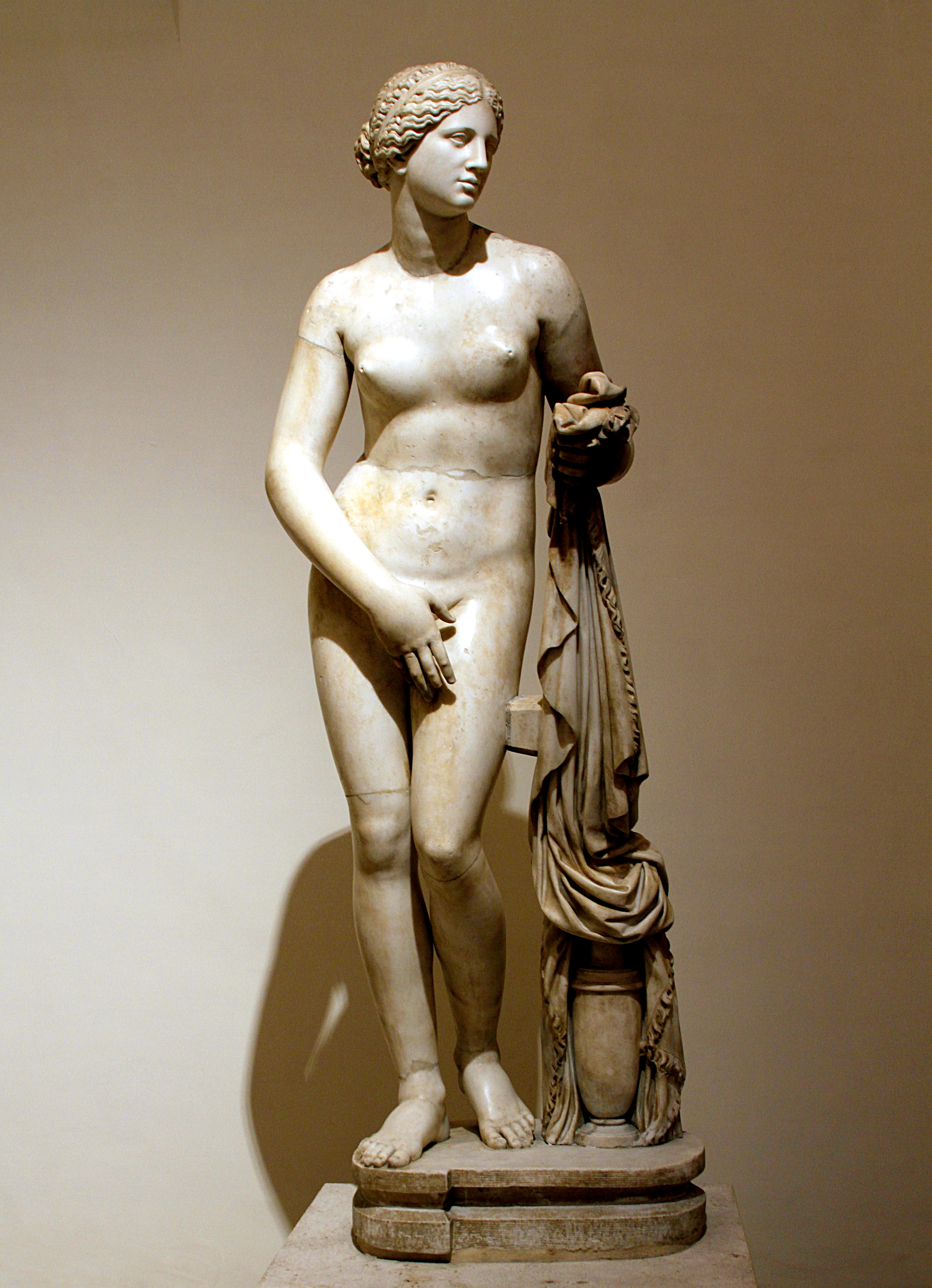
Roman copy of the Aphrodite of Cnidus. Phryne was the model.

- Aspasia, Greek hetaera, companion of Pericles
- Phryne, Greek hetaera
- Thaïs, Greek hetaera who lived during the time of Alexander the Great
- Theodora (6th century), empress of Byzantium

=== Early Modern era ===
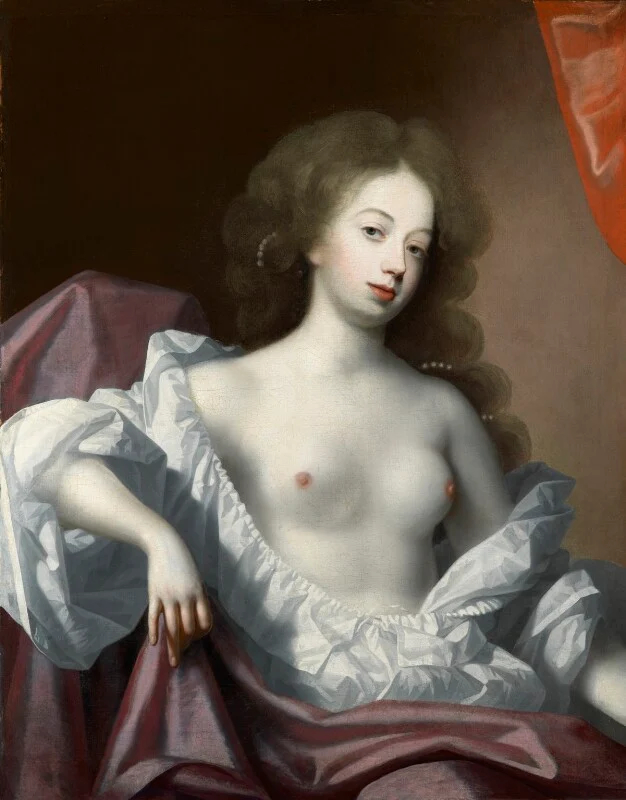
Nell Gwyn

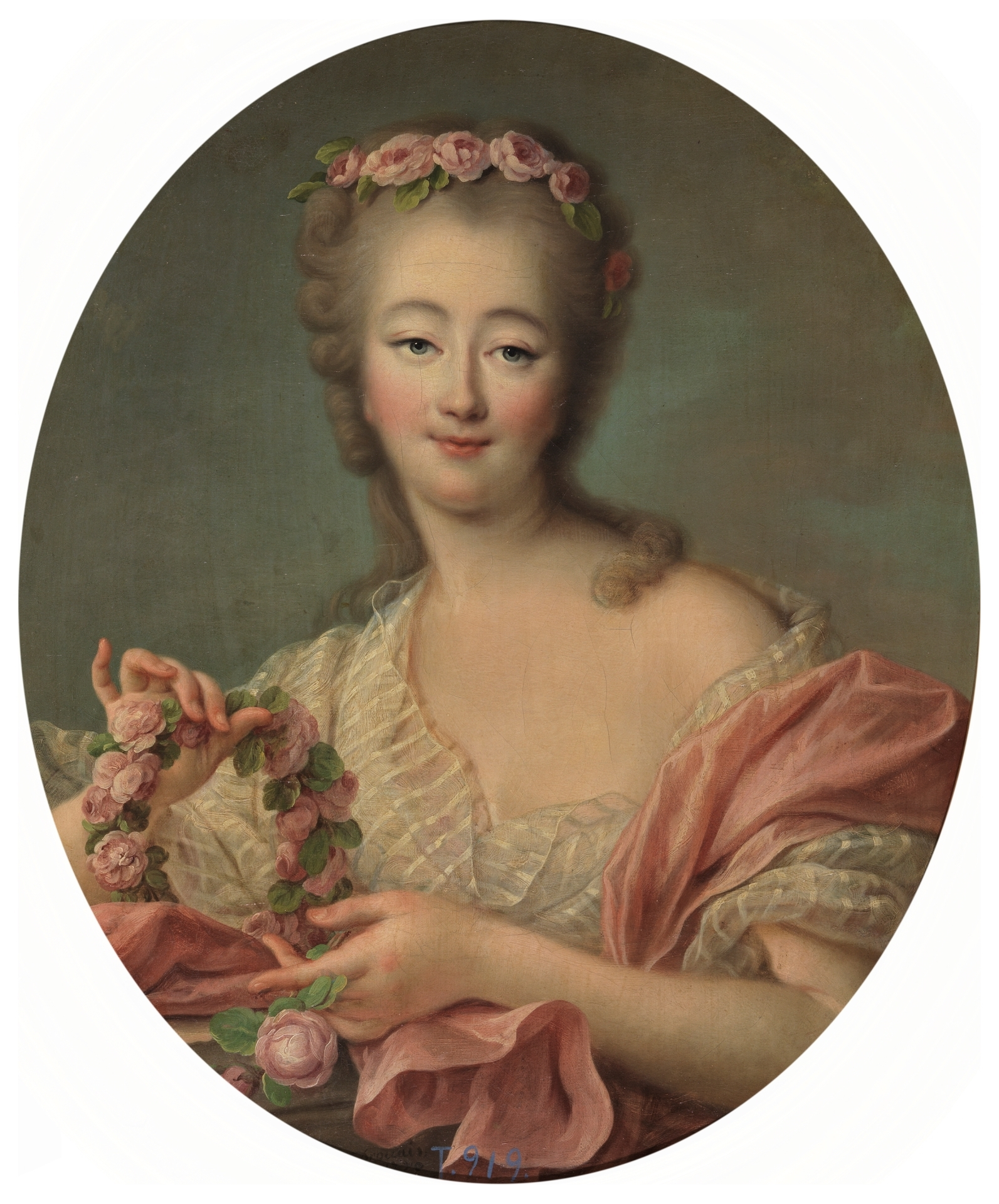
Madame du Barry

- Imperia Cognati, the "first courtesan" in Europe
- Isabella de Luna, Italian (originally Spanish) courtesan of Renaissance-era Rome.
- Hwang Jini, the most famous Korean gisaeng
- Veronica Franco, Venetian courtesan and poet
- Nell Gwyn, mistress to Charles II of England
- Chica da Silva, famous eighteenth-century slave courtesan in Colonial Brazil, subject of the movie Xica
- Madame du Barry, mistress to Louis XV of France, subject of numerous movies

=== 19th century ===
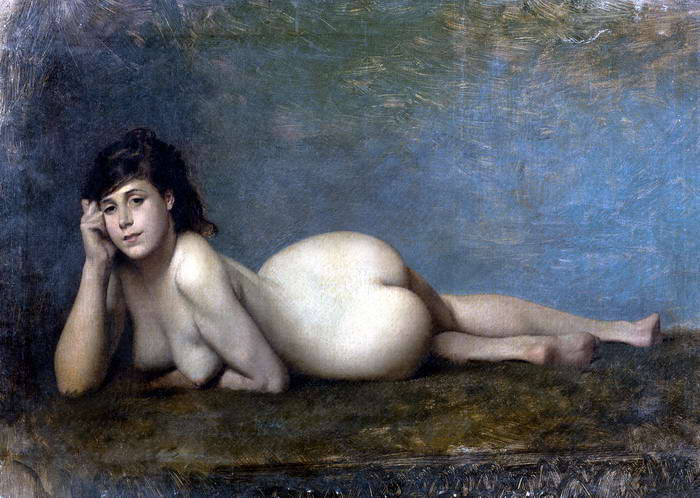
Famous nude painting of Emma Dupont by Jean-Léon Gérôme on his original canvas with scratches

- Laura Bell, the "Queen of London whoredom"
- Theresa Berkeley, dominatrix
- Jeanne Brécourt, born 1837, one of France's most notorious courtesans
- Julia Bulette, American prostitute in Virginia City, Nevada
- Annie Chapman, one of the "canonical five" victims of Jack the Ripper
- Emma Dupont, French courtesan and artist's model
- Josephine Earp, common-law wife of Wyatt Earp
- Mary Jane Kelly, one of the "canonical five" victims of Jack the Ripper
- Lizzie Lape, mid-Ohio madam, operator of multiple bordellos, 1880s-1900s
- Mary Ann Nichols, one of the "canonical five" victims of Jack the Ripper
- Sai Jinhua, Chinese famous prostitute and brothel madam
- Elizabeth Stride, one of the "canonical five" victims of Jack the Ripper
- Martha Tabram, a possible victim of Jack the Ripper
- Libby Thompson, "Squirrel Tooth Alice," madam of a brothel in Sweetwater, Texas

=== 20th century ===
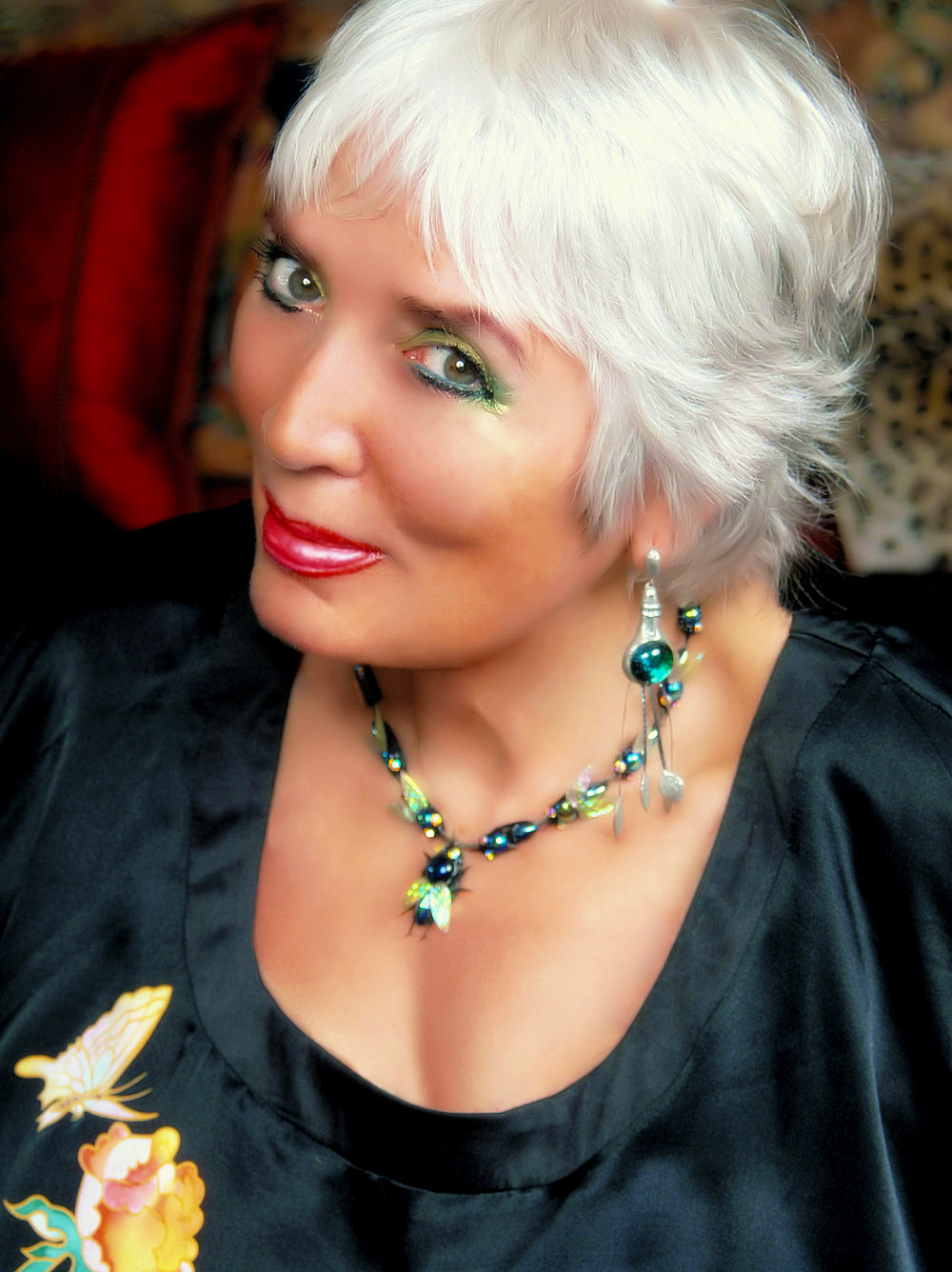
Xaviera Hollander

- Elizabeth Adams, (1933 or 1934–July 8, 1995), also known as Madam Alex, Hollywood madam
- Polly Adler, New York madam, 1920s to 1940s
- Josie Arlington, madam in Storyville, New Orleans
- Kimberly Daniels, former sex worker and drug addict who became a prolific author, religious minister and member of the Florida House of Representatives; introduced successful legislation to put "In God We Trust" in Florida school classrooms
- Anette Dawn, Hungarian make-up artist, ceramist and professional sex worker
- Zahia Dehar, Algerian-French fashion and lingerie designer and model
- Virginie Despentes, French writer known for her work exploring gender, sexuality and poverty.
- Carolin Ebert, a.k.a. Sexy Cora, German former prostitute, pornographic actress and reality show participant
- Heidi Fleiss, a.k.a. the "Hollywood Madam", ran an upscale prostitution ring based in Los Angeles during the 1990s
- Suzy Favor Hamilton, middle-distance runner in three Olympic Games, the subject of intense publicity when her activities as an escort became public
- Mata Hari (born Margaretha Geertruida Zelle), Dutch spy
- Gangubai Harjeevandas, a prostitute, an Indian social activist and madam of a brothel in the Kamathipura area of Mumbai during the 1960s
- Xaviera Hollander, author of the memoir The Happy Hooker: My Own Story
- La Macorina, Cuban courtesan, 1910s to 1930s
- Carol Leigh, a.k.a. Scarlot Harlot, coined the term "sex worker"
- Molly Luft, German prostitute, brothel owner and television personality
- Brooke Magnanti, blogger and scientist who wrote as Belle de Jour and was the inspiration for Billie Piper's character in Secret Diary of a Call Girl
- Domenica Niehoff, German prostitute, dominatrix, sex worker rights activist and television personality
- María de la Caridad Norberta Pacheco Sánchez, a.k.a. Caridad la Negra, Spanish prostitute and madam, early to mid-20th century
- Barbara Payton, American actress turned prostitute
- Charlotte Rose, an English sex worker, dominatrix, sexual trainer and political candidate
- Liara Roux, American prostitute, sex worker rights activist and author in New York
- Deanne Salinger, aka Air Force Amy, a legal prostitute in Nevada, pornographic actress, and adult model, who starred in the HBO television documentary series Cathouse: The Series. MSNBC has called her "a living legend in the world of sex."
- Margo St. James, activist and sex worker
- Ellen F. Steinberg, a.k.a. Annie Sprinkle, American former sex worker, porn star, and sex educator and writer
- Valérie Tasso, French author
- Estella Marie Thompson, also known as Divine Brown, an American and former prostitute who gained public attention in 1995 when actor Hugh Grant was caught receiving oral sex from her in his car
- Andressa Urach, also known as Ímola, Brazilian former sex worker
- Sheila Vogel-Coupe, at 85+ the oldest prostitute in the United Kingdom and, possibly, the world
- Clara Ward, Princesse de Caraman-Chimay, daughter of a Michigan lumberman who spent most of her life in Europe
- Lulu White, madam in Storyville, New Orleans

== Biblical figures ==
- Gomer, a prostitute whom God commanded Hosea to marry in the biblical Book of Hosea
- Mary Magdalene was supposed to have been a prostitute by those who identified her with the sinful woman in Luke 7:36–50, an identification now generally abandoned
- Rahab of Jericho

== Fictional characters ==
=== In literature ===
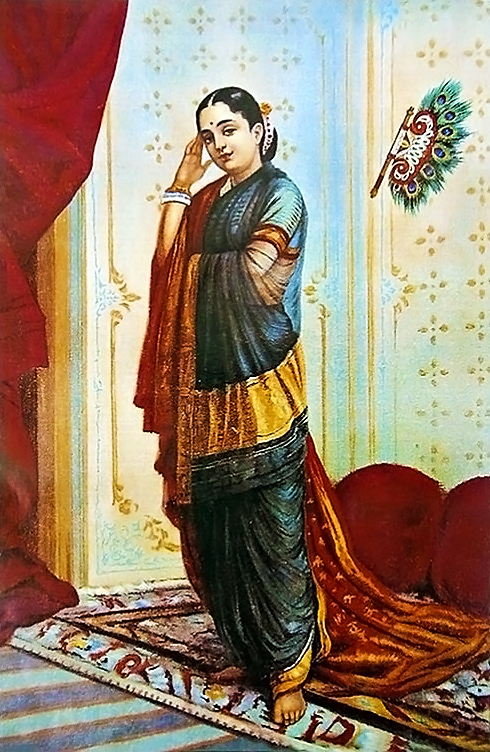
Vasantasena from the Sanskrit play Mṛcchakatika

- Angel/Sarah, Lucky, & Mai Ling, in Redeeming Love by Francine Rivers
- Bella Cohen, Florry, & Zoe, in Ulysses by James Joyce
- Belle, Ah, Wilderness! by Eugene O'Neill
- Belle Watling, Gone with the Wind by Margaret Mitchell
- Betsi, a female Whiphid, Star Wars: X-wing (book series) by Michael A. Stackpole.
- Candy, in Candy: A Novel of Love and Addiction by Luke Davies
- Candy, in One Flew Over the Cuckoo's Nest by Ken Kesey
- Dora Flood, in Cannery Row by John Steinbeck
- Chandramukhi, in Devdas by Sarat Chandra Chattopadhyay
- Eccentrica Gallumbits, "The Triple-Breasted Whore of Eroticon Six" in The Hitchhiker's Guide to the Galaxy by Douglas Adams
- Elisabeth Rouset, in "Boule de Suif", a short story by Guy de Maupassant
- Fanny Hill, in Fanny Hill by John Cleland
- Fantine, in Les Misérables by Victor Hugo
- Fauna Flood, in Sweet Thursday by John Steinbeck
- Flora Woods Adams, in Tortilla Flat by John Steinbeck
- Marguerite Gautier, from Alexandre Dumas, fils' work La Dame aux camélias, inspired by real life 19th-century courtesan Marie Duplessis,
- Jenny Smith, in Kurt Weill's Rise and Fall of the City of Mahagonny and The Threepenny Opera
- Juliette, in the Marquis de Sade's Juliette
- Kamala, in Siddhartha by Hermann Hesse
- Lady Sally, in Callahan's Lady by Spider Robinson
- Lozana, Portrait of Lozana by Francisco Delicado
- Lulu, in Frank Wedekind's plays and Alban Berg's opera of the same name
- Mamie Stover, The Revolt of Mamie Stover by William Bradford Huie
- Manon Lescaut
- Mistress Overdone, manager of a bordello in Measure for Measure by William Shakespeare
- Moll Flanders, The Fortunes and Misfortunes of the Famous Moll Flanders by Daniel Defoe
- Molly Malone, Irish urban legend
- Mother Goose, in Stravinsky's The Rake's Progress
- Nana, Nana, by Émile Zola
- Nancy, Oliver Twist by Charles Dickens
- Odette, in Marcel Proust's Un amour de Swann
- Phedre no Delauny of Jacqueline Carey's Kushiel novels
- Pie 'Oh' Pah, from Imajica by Clive Barker
- Romulus, central character in The Romanian: Story of an Obsession by Bruce Benderson
- Mrs. Rosie Palm, brothel owner and president of the Guild of "Seamstresses" in various Discworld novels by Terry Pratchett
- Satine, in Moulin Rouge! by Baz Luhrmann, a story based on the Paris nightclub of the same name
- Séverine Serizy, in the 1928 novel Belle de Jour and the 1967 film based on it
- Sonya Marmeladova, Crime and Punishment by Fyodor Dostoyevsky
- Suzie Wong, from The World of Suzie Wong by Richard Mason
- Talanta, La Talanta by Pietro Aretino
- Thúy Kiều, The Tale of Kieu by Nguyễn Du
- Tra La La, Last Exit to Brooklyn by Hubert Selby
- Tristessa, Tristessa by Jack Kerouac
- Vasantsenaa, a Nagarvadhu, or wealthy courtesan, in Śudraka's Sanskrit play Mṛcchakatika
- Violetta, main character from the opera La Traviata by Giuseppe Verdi, is also inspired by Alexandre Dumas' La Dame aux camélias. "La Traviata" means "the reprobate".
- Yumi Komagata, in Rurouni Kenshin by Nobuhiro Watsuki
- Zaza, in Zaza by Pierre Berton and Charles Simon
- Du Shiniang, a courtesan or high class prostitute, in "Du Shiniang Sinks the Treasure Box in Anger" by China's Ming Dynasty Feng Menglong

=== In film, television, and musical theater ===
- Belle the Sleeping Car, train in Starlight Express by Andrew Lloyd Webber
- Christine/Chelsea, central character in The Girlfriend Experience
- Inara Serra, Firefly by Joss Whedon
- Ai Nu (Lily Ho) in Intimate Confessions of a Chinese Courtesan (1972) by Chor Yuen (Hong Kong) (Mandarin) (Action, Drama)
- Bree Daniels (Jane Fonda) in Klute (1971) by Alan J. Pakula (USA) (English) (Crime, Mystery, Thriller)
- Cabiria (Giulietta Masina) in Nights of Cabiria (1957) by Federico Fellini (Italy, France) (Italian) (Drama)
- Cassiopeia (Laurette Spang) in Battlestar Galactica (1978) by Glen A. Larson (USA) (English) (Sci-Fi)
- Chandramukhi (Vyjayanthimala and Madhuri Dixit) in Devdas (1955) by Bimal Roy and Devdas (2002) by Sanjay Leela Bhansali respectively (India) (Hindi, Urdu, Bengali) (Drama, Musical, Romance); from novella by Saratchandra Chatterjee
- Chiyo Sakamoto (Ziyi Zhang) in Memoirs of a Geisha (2005) by Rob Marshall (USA) (English, Japanese) (Drama, Romance); from novel by Arthur Golden
- Claire Reine / Garance (Arletty) in Children of Paradise (1945) by Marcel Carné (France) (French) (Drama, Romance)
- Constance Miller (Julie Christie) in McCabe & Mrs. Miller (1971) by Robert Altman (USA) (English) (Drama, Western); from novel by Edmund Naughton
- Doris (Barbra Streisand) in The Owl and the Pussycat (1970) by Herbert Ross (USA) (English) (Comedy, Romance); from play by Bill Manhoff
- Eréndira (Claudia Ohana) in Eréndira (1983) by Ruy Guerra (France, Mexico, West Germany) (Portuguese, Spanish) (Drama); from novel by Gabriel García Márquez
- Fanny Hill (Letícia Román) in Fanny Hill (1964) by Russ Meyer (USA, West Germany) (English, German) (Comedy); from novel by John Cleland
- Fleur (Anita Mui) in Rouge (1988) by Stanley Kwan (Hong Kong) (Cantonese) (Drama, Fantasy, Music, Mystery, Romance); from novel by Lilian Lee
- Gigi (Leslie Caron) in Gigi (1958) by Vincente Minnelli (USA) (English, French) (); from novella by Colette
- Gloria Wandrous (Elizabeth Taylor) in BUtterfield 8 (1960) by Daniel Mann (USA) (English) (Drama); from novel by John O'Hara
- Hattie (Susan Sarandon) in Pretty Baby (1978) by Louis Malle (USA) (English) (Drama)
- Ilya (Melina Mercouri) in Never on Sunday (1960) by Jules Dassin (Greece, USA) (English, Greek, Russian) (Comedy, Drama, Romance)
- Iris (Jodie Foster) in Taxi Driver (1976) by Martin Scorsese (USA) (English, Spanish) (Crime, Drama)
- Irma La Douce (Shirley MacLaine) in Irma la Douce (1963) by Billy Wilder (USA) (English) (Comedy, Romance); from play by Alexandre Breffort
- Isabelle (Marine Vacth) in Young & Beautiful (2013) by François Ozon (France) (French, German) (Drama, Romance)
- Juxian (Gong Li), prostitute at an upscale brothel before marrying Duan Xiaolou in the book and film Farewell My Concubine
- Jade Ink (Ni Ni), prostitute in a brothel on the Qinhuai River in Nanjing, in the 2011 Chinese film The Flowers of War, directed by Zhang Yimou, adapted from the novel 13 Flowers of Nanjing (published in English as The Flowers of War) by Geling Yan
- Jade Ink (Song Jia), in the 2014 Chinese TV drama Si Shi Jiu Ri Ji, directed by Zhang Li, also adapted from the novel by Geling Yan
- Liz (Theresa Russell) in Whore (1991) by Ken Russell (USA) (USA, UK) (Drama); from play by David Hines
- Lorena Wood (Diane Lane) in Lonesome Dove (1989) by Simon Wincer (USA) (English) (Adventure, Drama, Western); from novel by Larry McMurtry
- Lynn Bracken (Kim Basinger) in L.A. Confidential (1997) by Curtis Hanson (USA) (English) (Crime, Drama, Mystery, Thriller); from novel by James Ellroy
- Marguerite Gautier (Greta Garbo) in Camille (1936) by George Cukor (USA) (English) (Drama, Romance); from novel & play by Alexandre Dumas
- Maya (Indira Varma) in Kama Sutra: A Tale of Love (1997) by Mira Nair (USA, India, UK, Japan, Germany) (English, Italian) (Crime, Drama, History, Romance)
- Nana (Catherine Hessling) in Nana (1926) by Jean Renoir (France) (French) (Drama, Romance); from novel by Émile Zola
- Ophelia (Jamie Lee Curtis) in the comedy film Trading Places (1983)
- Otsuya (Ayako Wakao) in Irezumi (1966) by Yasuzō Masumura (Japan) (Japanese) (Drama); from novel by Jun'ichirō Tanizaki
- Sahibjaan (Meena Kumari) in Pakeezah (1972) by Kamal Amrohi (India) (Urdu) (Musical, Romance, Drama)
- Satine (Nicole Kidman) in Moulin Rouge! (2001) by Baz Luhrmann (Australia, USA) (English, French, Spanish) (Drama, Musical, Romance)
- Satsu Sakamoto (Samantha Futerman), sister of Chiyo, who was not allowed to join the Geisha house and ended up in a brothel, instead. From the book and movie Memoirs of a Geisha.
- Seol-ji (Kim Ok-vin) in The Accidental Gangster and the Mistaken Courtesan (2008) by Yeo Kyun-dong (South Korea) (Korean) (Action, Adventure, Comedy)
- Séverine Serizy (Catherine Deneuve) in Belle de Jour (1967) by Luis Buñuel (France, Italy) (French, Spanish) (Drama); from novel by Joseph Kessel
- Suzie Wong (Nancy Kwan) in The World of Suzie Wong (1960) by Richard Quine (UK, USA) (English, Cantonese) (Drama, Romance); from novel by Richard Mason
- Tereza Batista (Patrícia França) in Tereza Batista: Home from the Wars (1992) by Paulo Afonso Grisolli (Brazil) (Portuguese) (Drama); from novel by Jorge Amado
- Umrao Jaan (Rekha) in Umrao Jaan (1981) by Muzaffar Ali (India) (Urdu, Hindi) (Drama, Romance); from novel by Mirza Haadi Ruswa
- Umrao Jaan (Aishwarya Rai Bachchan) in Umrao Jaan (2006) by J.P. Dutta (India) (Urdu, Hindi) (Drama, Romance); from novel by Mirza Haadi Ruswa
- Veronica Franco (Catherine McCormack) in Dangerous Beauty (1998) by Marshall Herskovitz (USA) (English) (Biography, Drama, Romance); from biography by Margaret Rosenthal
- Violet (Brooke Shields) in Pretty Baby (1978) by Louis Malle (USA) (English) (Drama)
- Vivian Ward (Julia Roberts) in Pretty Woman (1990) by Garry Marshall (USA) (English) (Comedy, Romance)
- Zoe (Julie Delpy) in Killing Zoe (1993) by Roger Avary (France, USA) (English, French) (Crime, Thriller)
- Huang Cuifeng (Michelle Reis), a Sing-song girl by Flowers of Shanghai (China), from novel The Sing-song Girls of Shanghai by Han Bangqing
- Blanche Simmons (Louise Jameson), Dorothy Bennett (Veronica Roberts) and Maggie Thorpe (Lizzie Mickery) in Tenko are all to some degree prostitutes. Maggie is intended to be a replacement for Blanche as by the 3rd series of Tenko, Blanche dies offscreen as a result of beri-beri.

== Symbolic or allegorical prostitutes ==
- The Whore of Babylon
- Moll Hackabout, the prostitute in The Harlot's Progress by William Hogarth

== In myth and legend ==
- Agatha - English prostitute, mother of Mother Shipton
- Basileia (Ancient Greece) - in Pandemos, this goddess was mainly a goddess for prostitutes or courtesans
- Bebhinn (Celts of the British Isles) - the goddess of pleasure
- Naamah (Hebrews) - an angel of prostitution, one of the succubus mates of the demon Samael in Zoharistic Qabalah
- Rahab, Biblical prostitute who assisted the Hebrews in capturing Jericho (Joshua 2:1–7)
- Shamhat (Sumer/Babylon)
- Xochiquetzal (Aztecs) - the goddess of prostitutes, pregnant women, and dancing
- Alexandra Dé Broussehan (Irish Celts) - a woman turned spirit of prostitution, caused a war between the Callahan and Lawlor clans, and often associated with Korrigan whose worship involved sacred prostitution

== See also ==
- Index of prostitute articles

== Bibliography ==
- Quan, Tracy. Opera, in Melissa Ditmore (ed.), Encyclopedia of Prostitution and Sex Work 2006
