= Tulisa (disambiguation) =

Tulisa (born 1988) is a British singer.

Tulisa may also refer to:

- Tulisa, the Wood-Cutter's Daughter, an Indian legend
- Tulișa River, in Romania
- Tulișa, a mountain in Uricani, Romania

== See also ==
- Tulasa Thapa
