= Mother lodge =

The term Mother lodge may refer to;

- Sally Lodge, an English sex worker.
- Mother Lodge, a type of Masonic lodge.
