= Lily Argent =

Welsh petty criminal and prostitute

- Lily Argent in Swansea Prison, 18 November 1905, aged 19
- Born: 8 October 1886; Swansea, Wales
- Died: 13 December 1916 (aged 30)
- Resting place: Danygraig cemetery
- Other name: Lily Bumster
- Occupations: Petty criminal, prostitute
- Spouse: Michael John Bumster

Lily Argent (8 October 1886 – 13 December 1916), Lily Bumster from November 1913, was a petty criminal from Swansea, Wales. She grew up in a home in which drunkenness and crime were commonplace, and received her first criminal conviction at the age of 19. She was arrested for theft, along with fellow prostitutes Kate Driscoll and Selina Rushbrook, in 1905. She was found not guilty, and the experience appears to have deterred her from a life of crime; she instead became a prostitute. Following the death of her mother in 1906 Argent descended into alcoholism.

In 1913 she married Michael John Bumster, the son of the owners of the boarding house in which she was living. The relationship was to be brief, as less than a year later her husband enlisted in the army on the outbreak of the First World War. Lily Bumster, by this time suffering severe tuberculosis, died in late 1916.

In her lifetime, Argent attracted little notice beyond official records and local newspaper accounts. Her life was examined by local historian Elizabeth Belcham in her book Swansea's 'Bad Girls': Crime and Prostitution 1870s–1914.

== Early life ==
Lily Argent was born on 8 October 1886 in Swansea. Her parents were William Argent, a local stonemason, and Margaret Argent née Webb, a servant in an eating house in Cross Street, Swansea; the family lived in Madoc Street, Swansea. Lily was the second of the Argents' six children. Throughout Lily's childhood, Margaret Argent and her sisters Annie Price, Harriet Griffiths and Elizabeth Winter made regular appearances in the courts for alcohol-related public order offences. (Note: A typical example of the Webb sisters' court appearances was that of the 31 March 1891, in which Annie Price was convicted of smacking Margaret Argent in the face, calling her "a black cow" and pulling her hair, and Argent was in turn accused of throwing pea soup on Annie Price's face. Price was found guilty and given the choice of a seven-day prison sentence or a 10s fine (about £50 in 2025 terms).)

The young Lily Argent grew up in an environment in which drunkenness, crime and violence was commonplace. She made the first of her many appearances in court in October 1898, when she testified on behalf of her mother in a case in which labourer James Davies was accused of breaking Margaret Argent's leg; Davies denied the charges, claiming that Margaret Argent had sustained the injuries falling over while trying to attack him.

== Adult life ==
In August 1905, having moved out of the family home in the intervening years, the 19-year-old Lily Argent received her first criminal conviction, a prosecution for drunkenness. As was customary at the time for a first offence, she was discharged on condition she enter the local workhouse. Within weeks she was arrested again and given a 10s fine (about £50 in 2025 terms) for fighting in the High Street. By this time she had been discharged from the workhouse and was lodging in The Strand in Swansea.

Kate Driscoll

Selina Rushbrook

On their arrest in November 1905, Lily Argent, along with her accomplices fellow prostitutes Kate Driscoll and Selina Rushbrook, were photographed.

As a young woman with no means of support these arrests did not discourage her from crime, and on 17 November that year she was arrested, along with her friends Selina Rushbrook and Catherine Driscoll (both well-known local thieves and prostitutes), for the theft of a sea captain's purse containing £5 10s (about £600 in 2025 terms). On this occasion, all three were found not guilty of the theft on grounds of insufficient evidence. (Note: Swansea in this period was a major port. Prostitutes doing business with sailors would enquire as to when they were sailing out, and if the customer's ship was due to sail soon would attempt to steal their money, in the knowledge that by the time they appeared in court the victim would no longer be available to give evidence. As sailors were paid back-pay for their time at sea once on shore, they often had large quantities of cash on them, little to spend it on, little knowledge of the city, and often took the opportunity of shore leave to get drunk, making them ideal targets for prostitutes and thieves.)

It appears that this narrow escape finally turned Lily Argent away from a life of crime, and she was never again to be arrested for theft, although she continued to work as a prostitute. In 1906 Margaret Argent died from cerebral softening and eclampsia. Her daughter gradually became an alcoholic, and in May 1909, after not coming to the notice of the authorities for over three years, Lily Argent was again arrested for riotous behaviour and imprisoned for a month. She was arrested yet again for drunkenness in February and December 1910; on the latter occasion, the arresting officer described her as "using most abusive and indecent language".

== Marriage and death ==
By this time Argent was living in Michael and Margaret Bumster's boarding-house at 68 Strand, and continuing to work as a prostitute. Along with fellow prostitute Annie Boatwright, she was one of only two unmarried female boarders in an otherwise entirely male establishment. In November 1913 Argent married the Bumsters' son, Michael John Bumster. Their relationship was to be brief; on the outbreak of the First World War in August 1914, Michael John Bumster—who had previous military training (Note: As a 14-year-old boy Michael John Bumster had joined the Welch Regiment, only to be discharged nine months later for unrecorded reasons.)—enlisted in the army. On 26 October 1914 Lily Bumster was again prosecuted for assault, the last of her arrests. On 13 December 1916, by this time suffering from severe tuberculosis, Lily Bumster died of cardiac failure, aged 30. She was buried, alongside her parents, (Note: Wiliam Argent died in February 1913, age 51.) in the family plot in Danygraig Cemetery.

== See also ==
- Contagious Diseases Acts
- Inebriates Act 1898
