= Bente Lyon =

Norwegian criminal

Bente Lyon is a Norwegian convicted of narcotics trafficking, and she has been convicted of organizing a brothel in Norway from 2000 to 2002. She has worked as a prostitute.

In 2006 she was portrayed on NRK's TV show "Bokprogrammet" in connection with her book Horemamma (female manager of whore/whores). NRK's website says that the book is about Lyon's "time of greatness as Oslo's brothel queen".

An article in Dagbladet in 2006 called her "Norway's uncontested brothel keeper" (Norges ubestridte bordellmamma).

== Aiding in the smuggling of narcotics ==
In 2007 an appellate court verdict (of five years in prison) was upheld and she was convicted for aiding and abetting in the smuggling of narcotics from Amsterdam to USA: 1.6 kilograms of cocaine and 11000 ecstasy tablets. Verdens Gang said that her contribution to the smuggling, consisted of providing contact persons in Amsterdam, and providing airplane tickets for the two persons who carried out the smuggling.

== Research on media coverage ==
In an article in 2005 on the website of Research Council of Norway's Information Centre for Gender Research—about research on media coverage of defendants prosecuted for pimping, May-Len Skilbrei (a researcher at UiO's Institute of Criminology and Sociology of law) said that "The interesting thing is that nearly all Norwegian media refer to Bente Lyon as whore mama, just like she wants. There are also other ways in which the dangerousness of Bente and her crimes, are downplayed (ufarliggjøres). In other trials of pimping, details about the events and consequences for the victims are often emphasized. But from Bente's trials, media's focus is often on her juicy punchlines such as "Herregud, Prosecutor, this was no common enterprise—this was a whorehouse". I can not envision that the looks of others tried for pimping, would be described in detail, as in Bente's case."
