= Selina Rushbrook =

Welsh prostitute and brothel keeper (1880–1907)

- Selina Rushbrook, Swansea Prison photograph 5 November 1905
- Born: Selina Ann Jenkins; June 1880; Swansea, Wales
- Died: 17 February 1907 (aged 26); North Dock, Swansea, Wales
- Occupations: Prostitute, brothel keeper, petty criminal
- Spouse: Ebenezer Rushbrook (m.1901)
- Parents: Francis Jenkins (father); Catherine Jenkins (mother)

Selina Jenkins Rushbrook (born Selina Ann Jenkins; June 1880 – 17 February 1907) was a Welsh petty criminal, prostitute and brothel keeper from Swansea, Wales. Raised by her mother following her father's death when she was four years old, she moved out of her family home as a teenager and served her first prison sentence at the age of 18, by which time she was already working as a prostitute. She received many convictions for prostitution, public order offences and theft in subsequent years. In 1901 she married shoemaker Ebenezer Rushbrook, and continued to work as a prostitute and thief. The couple moved to Bridgend, and although both Selina and Ebenezer Rushbrook were convicted of theft in 1902 she appears not to have come to the attention of the authorities for the three years following that incident.

In late 1905 or early 1906 the Rushbrooks separated, and Selina returned to Swansea to work as a prostitute. In February 1907, while leading prospective client Ernest Witts towards a secluded area of Swansea Docks, she fell from a footbridge into the lock. Although Witts attempted to grab her he failed to reach her and was left holding her shawl. He made no further effort to save her as he was unable to swim and instead went to fetch help; roughly three hours later, police recovered her body from the lock.

In her lifetime, Rushbrook attracted little notice beyond official records and local newspaper accounts. Her life was examined by local historian Elizabeth Belcham in her book Swansea's 'Bad Girls': Crime and Prostitution 1870s–1914.

== Early life ==
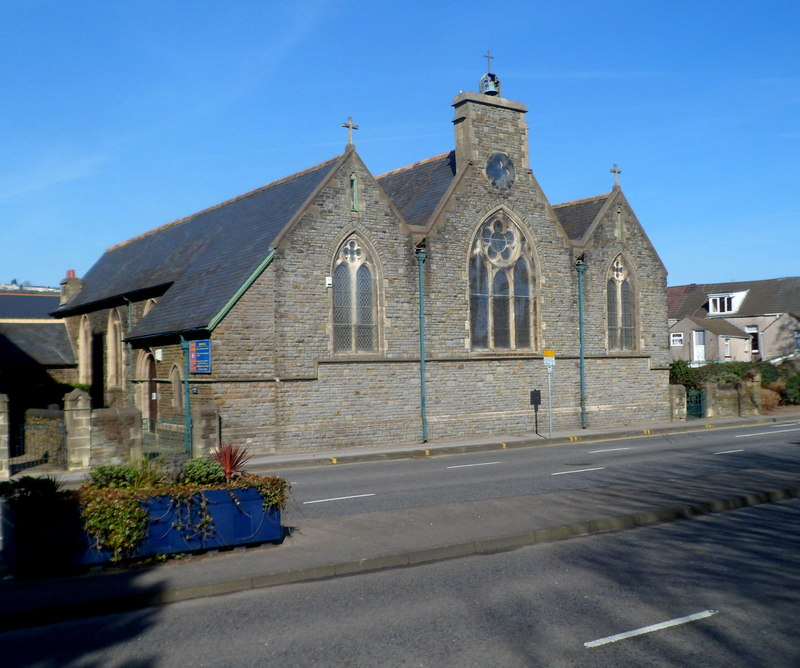
Selina Jenkins was baptised in Christ Church, and lived in the area for most of her life.

Born in June 1880 in Swansea, Selina Ann Jenkins was the eldest of the three children of Francis James Jenkins and Catherine Jenkins; she was baptised into the Church of England at Christ Church in Oystermouth Road. A basket maker from Cornwall, Francis Jenkins settled with his family at 114 Rodney Street in Swansea. Francis Jenkins died in May 1885 at the age of 30, leaving Catherine Jenkins to raise the couple's three daughters alone. In 1887 Catherine married mason John Collins, having two children by him. (Note: John and Catherine Collins had five children together; three were born after Selina had moved out of the family home.) By early 1899, Selina was no longer living with her family, but had moved into Vaughan's lodging house on The Strand, Swansea. (Note: Vaughan's lodging house (also known as The Old Ship and Castle), near Swansea High Street railway station, was one of the few boarding houses in Swansea not run by religious organisations to accept single female clients. As a consequence it, and the 39 other buildings on the Strand owned by property developer David Vaughan, acquired a reputation for prostitution and other illegal activities.)

Selina Jenkins first came to the attention of the authorities in February 1899, when she was arrested for riotous behaviour. Given the choice of seven days' hard labour in Swansea Prison or a 13s 6d fine (about £70 in 2025 terms), she opted for the custodial sentence, the first of her many spells in prison; the prison records describe her as being 5 feet 2 1/2 inches (158.8 cm) tall, with brown hair, an imperfect education and an occupation of prostitute.

== Adult life ==
In June 1899, Jenkins was convicted of "offences against decency (Note: Having sex in a public place.) in a lane near the Sailors' Rest" with Swansea resident Thomas O'Connell. Jenkins and O'Connell were each sentenced to a £1 fine (about £110 in 2025 terms) or 10 days' imprisonment. A report at the time in the South Wales Daily Post described both O'Connell and Jenkins as looking "very shamefaced".

Soon afterwards she had progressed from prostitution to procuring, operating a brothel in Welsh Harp Court, Swansea. On 19 September 1899 PC Umpleby and PC Hockings attended the brothel, and "witnessed circumstances which irrefutably stamped the house as being used for immoral purposes". Sentenced to a £10 3s 6d fine (about £1,100 in 2025 terms) or a month's hard labour, Jenkins told the judge "Oh, I'll take the month", and was duly sent to Swansea Prison on 2 October 1899. (Note: Some newspaper reports of the time list the proposed fine as a round £10.) A report on the case in the Western Mail described Selina Jenkins as "a very young-looking woman". Shortly after her release she was arrested for disorderly conduct, and in November 1899 was sentenced to seven days' imprisonment, this time without being given the option to pay a fine in lieu of a custodial sentence. On her release her career of petty crime continued. On 17 April 1900 she was again arrested for riotous behaviour, and on 11 May of that year was duly sentenced to seven days' imprisonment.

Selina Jenkins, October 1900

Following her release in mid-May Jenkins moved out of Vaughan's lodging house into new lodgings at 4 Owens Court, Swansea. She avoided coming to the notice of the authorities for the next few months, but had progressed from prostitution to more serious crimes. In October 1900 Jenkins was convicted, along with fellow prostitutes Mary Ann Rumph and Mary Ann Howlett, of the theft of a half sovereign and half crown (12s 6d in total, about £70 in 2025 terms) from Benjamin Williams in the Bird-in-Hand pub in the High Street. All three were sentenced to a month's hard labour. On her release Jenkins again avoided the attention of the police, other than a single conviction for public drunkenness for which she received a seven-day prison sentence. She moved into new accommodation in Neptune Court, and in May 1901 married shoemaker Ebenezer Rushbrook, with whom she had lived for the previous five months.

== Married life ==
Married life appears to have had little impact on Selina Rushbrook's lifestyle. In June 1901 an unidentified woman (likely to have been Selina Rushbrook) was arrested by PC Maggs of the Swansea Borough Police. As Maggs attempted to march her to the police station, Ebenezer Rushbrook approached the pair, told the officer that the woman in question was his wife, and demanded she be released. PC Maggs declined to do so; the woman fell to the floor, and as Maggs bent to hold her Ebenezer Rushbrook jumped onto his back and knocked his hat off to the ground. As Maggs reached to collect his hat the woman took the opportunity to flee; Ebenezer was duly arrested and sentenced to a fine of 40s (about £200 in 2025 terms) or one month's imprisonment. (Ebenezer Rushbrook claimed that he had not intervened until he saw PC Maggs kicking the woman while she was on the floor.) Shortly afterwards, in August 1901, Ebenezer was convicted of "knowingly living on the earnings of his wife's immorality", and sentenced to three months' hard labour. In December of that year Selina was convicted of the theft of a purse from a sailor, and sentenced to two months' hard labour owing to her lengthy criminal record; her accomplice, fellow prostitute Rose Willis, received the lighter sentence of one month's imprisonment.

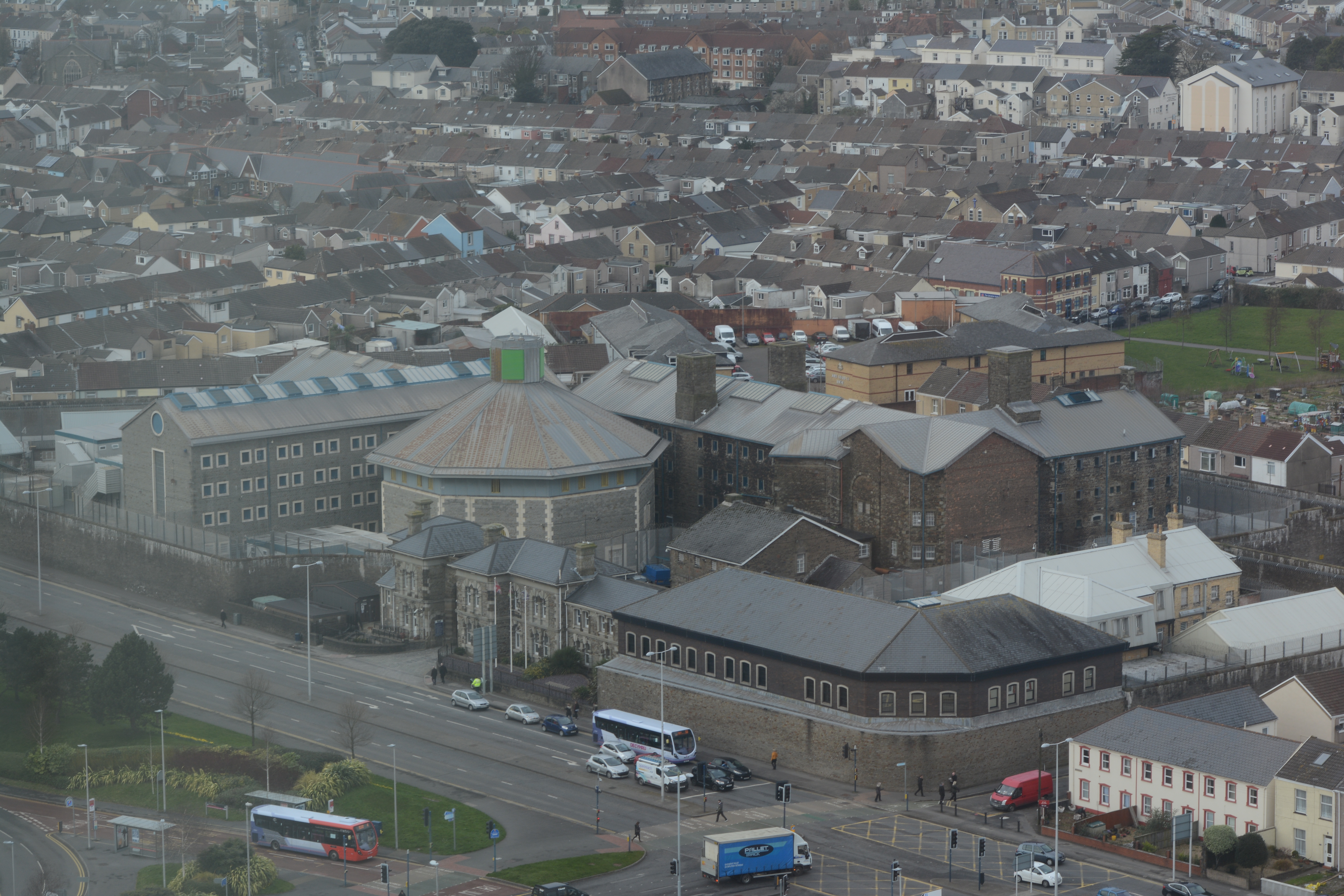
Swansea Prison, in which Selina Rushbrook spent much of her adult life

Soon after her release, the Rushbrooks moved to Bridgend. The move did not reduce the couple's criminal activities, and in November 1902 Selina was convicted, along with fellow prostitute Sarah Musgrove, of stealing a watch in the York Hotel, Bridgend from William Howells of Coity. Ebenezer was convicted of receiving the watch in question and pawning it, and all three were sentenced to one month's hard labour.

Following this conviction, the Rushbrooks disappeared from police attention until late 1905, when Ebenezer received a 14-day custodial sentence for "behaving like a madman" towards police. After this incident the couple separated, (Note: The exact date of the separation is not recorded, but at the February 1907 inquest into Selina's death Ebenezer testified that they had been separated for over 12 months.) with Selina returning to Vaughan's lodging house in Swansea. Arrested on 17 November 1905 along with her friends Catherine Driscoll and Lily Argent for the theft of a sea-captain's purse, all three were found not guilty. Other than this incident, the only occasion on which she came to police notice was an incident in late 1906 when her neighbour William Jones was sentenced to a month's imprisonment for giving her two black eyes and knocking her into a telegraph pole.

== Death ==
The woman and myself were going up the canal side, and she said "Follow me up these steps". And I did so. She then crossed a small footbridge, and told me to be careful. She got across the bridge and went against the large wooden lever with which the canal is closed, and falling backwards went into the canal. I tried to catch her, but only succeeded in grasping her shawl.

— Ernest Witts, statement to police, 17 February 1907

In the early hours of 17 February 1907, shortly after midnight, Selina Rushbrook was walking near Swansea Docks in the company of King's Dock labourer Ernest Witts. According to Witts's testimony, he had met Rushbrook in the Engineers' Inn at 8:30 pm the previous evening, where he had bought her a drink. The two had left the pub separately, but had met again at another pub where he bought her another drink, and at around 11 pm she "made a suggestion" to which he agreed. Rushbrook led him to Pottery Bridge, a drawbridge separating North Dock from a canal. (Note: A contemporary report described the bridge as "extremely narrow, practically only a plank".) While crossing the narrow bridge Rushbrook caught her foot on a beam, and fell into the lock below. Although Witts tried to catch her he failed to do so, only managing to grab her shawl. Witts, still holding Rushbrook's shawl, approached a police officer in the High Street and informed him of what had happened, and soon afterwards police arrived at the scene with grappling irons. The water level in the lock was lowered, and at 3 am Rushbrook's body was recovered. She had just 6s 5d (about £30 in 2025 terms) in her possession when she died.

At the subsequent inquest, held at the nearby Adelaide Hotel on 18 February, Witts testified that after Rushbrook had fallen from the bridge he made no attempt to save her as he was unable to swim. A verdict of accidental death was recorded, and at the direction of the coroner the jury added a note that inadequate lighting had made the area around Pottery Bridge a dark and dangerous place at night and that the local authority should take steps to improve lighting. The coroner commended Witts for his honesty for giving "the bald ugly truth" in his account of events, and conceded that in intentionally leading Witts to a place where they were unlikely to be seen or heard Rushbrook had harmed the chances of her being rescued. However, the coroner strongly criticised Witts for making no attempt to rescue Rushbrook, saying that "probably his muddled state through drink was his only excuse", and warned him to give up his lifestyle, to which Witts replied "Yes, sir". Selina Rushbrook was buried in the Jenkins family plot in Danygraig Cemetery.

== See also ==
- Contagious Diseases Acts
- Inebriates Act 1898
