= Sigurd Wathne =

Norwegian footballer (1898-1942)

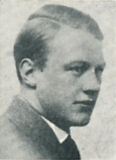

Personal information
- Date of birth: 12 February 1898
- Place of birth: Copenhagen, Denmark
- Date of death: 26 March 1942 (aged 44)
- Place of death: Swansea, Wales
- Position: Goalkeeper

Senior career*
| Years | Team | Apps | (Gls) |
- SK Brann

International career
| | Norway | 14 | |
- * Club domestic league appearances and goals

Sigurd Wathne (12 February 1898 – 26 March 1942) was a Denmark-born Norwegian football goalkeeper, playing for the club SK Brann. He was born in Copenhagen. He was on the Norway national team at the Antwerp Olympics in 1920; they reached the quarter finals. He was capped 14 times for Norway.

A seaman in the Norwegian Merchant Navy during World War II he sailed as first engineer with SS Risøy, which was bombed by German aircraft when in convoy off Trevose Head, Cornwall, on 20 March 1942, and he died in a hospital in Swansea six days later. He was buried at Danygraig Cemetery, Swansea.
