= Upper Chapel =

Unitarian chapel in Sheffield, England

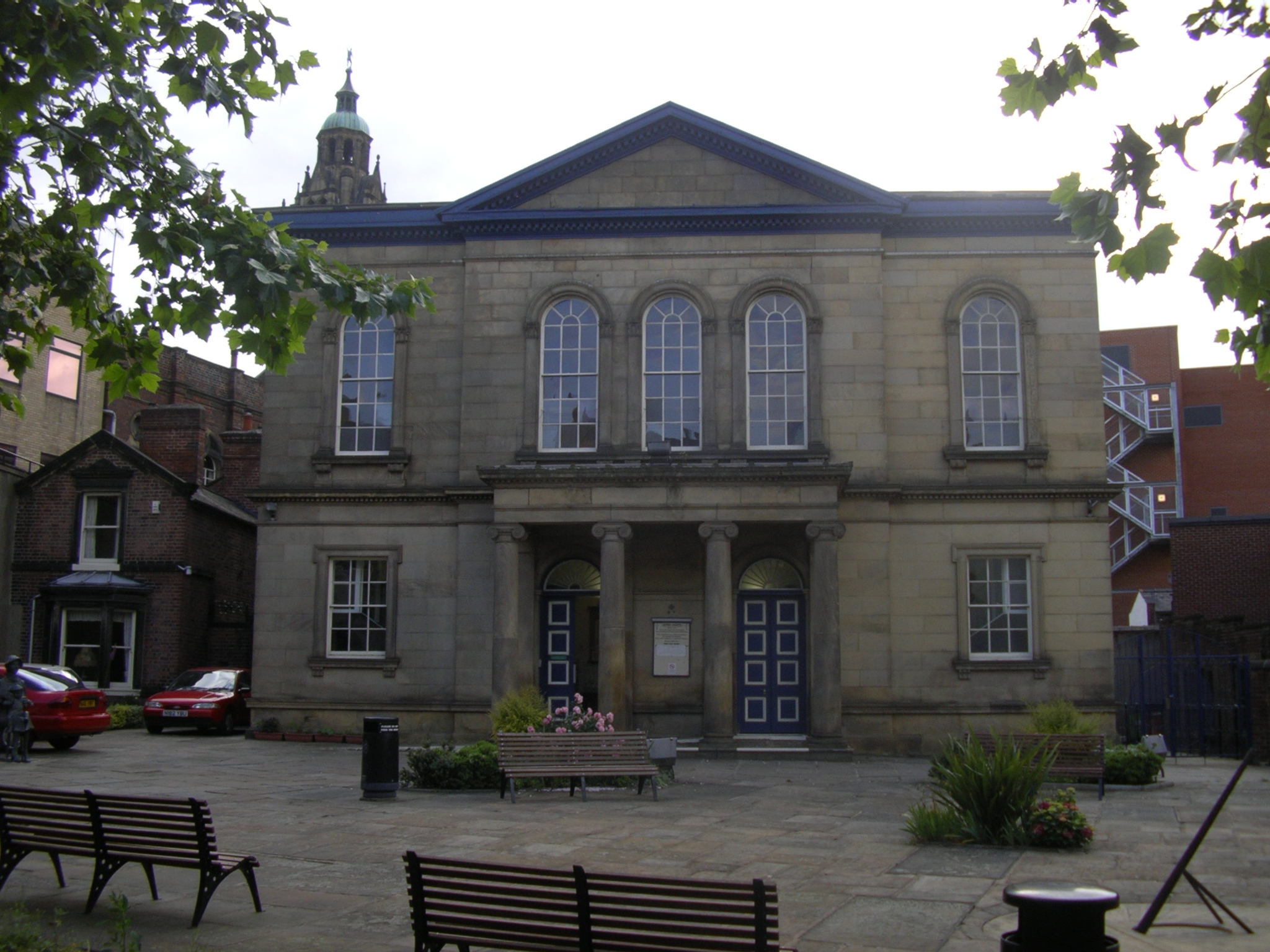
- Facade of the Upper Chapel

- Location within Sheffield

Religion
- Affiliation: Unitarian

Location
- Location: Sheffield City Centre; South Yorkshire, England
- Interactive map of Upper Chapel
- Coordinates: 53.3808°N 1.4683°W

Architecture
- Type: Church
- Completed: 1700
- Materials: Brick

Upper Chapel is a Unitarian chapel on Norfolk Street in Sheffield City Centre. It is a member of the General Assembly of Unitarian and Free Christian Churches, the umbrella organisation for British Unitarians. The Chapel is Grade II listed.

James Fisher was the vicar at Sheffield Parish Church during the Commonwealth of England. He was expelled in the Great Ejection for refusing to sign the Act of Uniformity 1662, and around a tenth of his parishioners followed him in becoming Dissenters.

Several splits ensued, but by the 1690s, the dominant group of non-conformists was led by Timothy Jollie. His congregation constructed Upper Chapel as the first non-conformist chapel in Sheffield in 1700. It was built of brick and faced on to Fargate. The chapel originally boasted a congregation of about 1,000 people, a sixth of the city's population. The side walls survive from this period.

In the 1840s, the Chapel was turned round to face across fields. The roof was raised and the interior reconstructed. The alterations by John Frith were completed in 1848, while the interior has several later additions, including several stained glass windows. Nine on the ground floor are by Henry Holiday.

Nineteenth-century ministers included George Vance Smith, Brooke Herford, Thomas Hinks and John Edmondson Manning, who wrote a history of the chapel in 1900.

The Chapel is linked to Channing Hall, which faces on to Surrey Street. Designed by Flockton and Gibbs and completed in 1882, the hall is of Italianate design and is named for William Henry Channing, who served at the Chapel in 1875.

The trustees own many freehold properties in Sheffield.
