= John Edmondson Manning =

John Edmondson Manning (22 March 1848 – 30 April 1910) was an English Unitarian minister.

== Life ==
The son of John Manning, a schoolmaster in Liverpool, he was born there on 22 March 1848. His brother-in-law, George Beaumont, Unitarian minister at Gateacre, helped his preparation for the ministry. He studied at Queen's College Liverpool (1866–8), Manchester New College, London (1868–73), and at Leipzig (1875–6). He then graduated B.A. at London University in 1872, was Hibbert scholar in 1873, and proceeded M.A. in 1876.

Manning's settlements in the ministry were Swansea (1876–89) and Upper Chapel, Sheffield (1889–1902). While at Swansea he was (1878–88) visitor and examiner in Hebrew and Greek to the Presbyterian College, Carmarthen. At the Unitarian Home Missionary College, Manchester, he was visitor (1892–4), and from 1894 till his death tutor in Old Testament, Hebrew, and philosophy.

Manning died of the effects of pleurisy, contracted on a holiday in Italy, on 30 April 1910 aged 62, at his residence, Harper Hill, Sale, Cheshire. He was buried in the Danygraig Cemetery, Swansea.

== Works ==
Manning published, besides separate sermons and tracts:

- A History of Upper Chapel, Sheffield, Sheffield, 1900.
- Addresses at the Unitarian Home Missionary College, Manchester, 1903.
- Thomas a Kempis, and the "De Imitatione Christi," Manchester, 1907.

== Family ==
Manning married in 1879 Emma, youngest daughter of George Browne Brock, J.P. (formerly minister at Swansea), who survived him with three daughters.

== Notes ==
Attribution

This article incorporates text from a publication now in the public domain: Lee, Sidney, ed. (1912). "Manning, John Edmondson". Dictionary of National Biography (2nd supplement). Vol. 12. London: Smith, Elder & Co.
