= Mary Ann Greaves =

Prostitute, criminal

- Born: 1834; Leicestershire, England
- Died: 18 February 1897 (aged 62–63); Christchurch, New Zealand
- Other names: Mary Ann Graves
- Occupation: Prostitute

Mary Ann Greaves (1834 – 18 February 1897), also known as Mary Ann Graves, was a New Zealand prostitute and criminal. She was born in Leicestershire, England. The Canterbury Police Gazette of 1 June 1871 describes her as being 5' 4", slight build and having sandy hair and grey eyes. Greaves appeared before the Supreme Court four separate times (1862, 1866, 1868 and 1869). This was the highest number of times for a female at that time.

== Criminality ==
She emigrated to Canterbury New Zealand from Tasmania in 1859. (She had possibly been transported to Tasmania as a criminal.) Her first known court appearance was in 1862. In 1864, she was listed as one of 14 known prostitutes in Christchurch, living in its only known brothel in Kaiapoi.

By 1866, she is described as an infamous criminal. Under a period of years, she became well known for appearing in a number of court cases regarding prostitution, robberies, public drunkenness, using obscene language and other crimes. In September that year, Greaves was sentenced to two years imprisonment for assault and robbery on a Thomas Davis. Fellow prostitute Mary Holmes and Charles Yates were also jailed for this incident.

In 1869 she took a man outside of the Criterion Hotel and whilst engaged in "other matters", allegedly rifled his pockets. When the man accused her of theft she struck him and called him a liar. The jury of the Supreme Court found her guilty and the judge told her "It is quite evident upon the facts that you are an old and hardened offender. I am sorry to say that both the Magistrate and I know you too well" She was sentenced to another two years. Greaves was released from prison on 12 May 1871 after being pardoned. Although released at 4pm, by that evening she had been arrested for being drunk and disorderly and solicitation.

Greaves agreed to leave Christchurch after being arrested for soliciting outside the Mitre Hotel in March 1872. She failed to do so and was described as "incorrigible" and returned to jail.

The Contagious Diseases Act 1869 required prostitutes to undergo regular medical examinations. In 1876 she was in court for failing to attend medical examinations and was sent to the Contagious Diseases Reformatory.

In June 1877 in Oamaru she was convicted of perjury and sentenced to 18 months' imprisonment. During the trial (having used the alias Alice Purnell) she testified "I have been 15 or 16 years in New Zealand. I came from London as a married woman. I lived in the Province of Canterbury till I came to Oamaru.... I was in Timaru between 10 and 12 months. I was convicted in Timaru for vagrancy, and received three months' imprisonment.... I can write my name "Mary Ann Greaves," but not very well."

In 1887 Greaves was fined 30 Shillings for being drunk and disorderly and fighting with another prostitute, Ellen Parkinson.

== Children ==
Greaves had at least one daughter and possibly at least 3 daughters. One daughter, Catherine, was born in Tasmania and in 1866, when she was 14 years old, appeared in court for a breach of the peace. She subsequently appeared in court many times and jailed for theft and prostitution. An 1867 (when Greaves was in prison) register of prostitutes in Christchurch list a Mary Ann Greaves " Of no fixed abode" and that "Her mother is in prison, the Government support her two sisters". This is possibly another daughter of Greaves.

== Retirement ==
In 1893, Greaves was reported to have retired from criminality, although still listed in that year's register of brothels and described as "quiet". She was living in Sydenham with 'a notorious thief'. On 18 February 1897 she died of apoplexy.
