= Maheeda =

Nigerian singer (born 1982)

- Born: Caroline Samuel; 22 November 1982 (age 43); Benin City, Edo State, Nigeria
- Other name: Goddex of X
- Occupations: Singer, adult model
- Years active: 2010 - present

Caroline Samuel (born 22 November 1982), better known as Maheeda, is a Nigerian singer, nude model. According to her, she began her musical career as a hip hop singer but became a gospel singer after becoming "born again". She is widely known for sharing raunchy photos on Instagram and making controversial remarks on issues and have been censored from the social media site on several occasions. In 2014, she released her debut gospel track, "Concrete Love", which she noted was inspired by the love of God towards her.

== Early life ==
Maheeda hails from Edo State. She was born 22 November 1982 in northern Nigeria. Maheeda's mother died when she was at a tender age and she never knew her dad. According to her, the inability to meet her financial obligations and fend for herself led her into music and housekeeping afterwards. She had a daughter at age 17.

== Personal life ==
Maheeda met her future husband while working in a bar in Nigeria, who upon listening to her story decided to help her and her teenage daughter. She got married and relocated to Netherlands but visits Nigeria frequently. She presently lives with her husband and daughter in the Netherlands. She considers sex as having an uncontrollable supernatural effect on people since despite being married and living comfortably, she still had the urge to sleep with men. She described her relationship with God as the only thing that stopped her zeal for sex from men, explaining that "being born again and delivered" was the only thing that stopped the need for sex. Speaking to Galaxy TV, she explained that her love for unclad pictures isn't aimed at promoting sexual immorality, rather it's because she "feels sexy". She went further to say Nigerians were being hypocritical in their reservations concerning her dress sense and nudity. She described her spiritual life as still being in connection to God irrespective of her outward appearance and digital identity. She describes Hell fire as a fiction of the imagination of Africans, and believes the government will be impacting the masses positively, if they legalize prostitution, especially since more developed countries are doing it.

== Career ==
According to her, she began singing while in primary school. At age 23, she chose music as a profession despite facing challenges with funding while promoting her musical career. According to her, the name Maheeda means blessing and treasure, hence her decision to choose it as a stage name. She classifies her music as a "cocktail" because just like wine, it is intended to encompass all aspects of human life. She claims to get her musical inspiration from God because God saw her through being a single mother till she got married and then ventured into music professionally. Speaking on the reaction of her family to her nudity, she explained her husband and his family accept, understand and support her in all she does. In 2015, Nigerian Entertainment Today disclosed that she was more widely known than Don Jazzy and Linda Ikeji based on analytics from Google and WordPress. In August 2016, she revealed that she doesn't really mean many of the things she has said in the past during interviews.

In an interview with Daily Post, she revealed that getting the interest of Nigerians was the aim of her nudity. She also opined that there are monetary rewards for each video she produces.
