= Yvette Laclé =

Dutch politician and activist

- Born: Yvette Lont(-Eersel); 25 August 1955 (age 69); Paramaribo, Suriname
- Occupation: Politician

Yvette Laclé (born 25 August 1955) until early 2009 known as Yvette Lont(-Eersel), is a former Dutch local politician for the ChristianUnion (ChristenUnie) and later as an independent one in Amsterdam from 2002 to 2008. A reformed prostitute and drug addict, Laclé caused considerable controversy in 2007 when she suggested that gay men should be sexually abstinent and leave mainstream LGBT culture.

== Biography ==
Born in Paramaribo, Suriname, Laclé arrived in the Netherlands when she was eight. After her parents divorced, she was brought up by her mother. While her mother was out at work, she started to use drugs. When 16, she left home and began to work as a dancer, first at the theatre, later in an Amsterdam nightclub. She was offered cocaine by a pimp, became addicted and worked as a prostitute in return for more and more drugs. During her nine years as a prostitute, she had a child but finally reached the point where she spent three days out of control as a result of the effects of hard drugs, completely forgetting her child. Realizing that she could not expect assistance from those around her, she turned to God, calling for his help. She immediately believed she had received supernatural strength and that she was now in a position to fight her problem. The next day she called her mother and asked for forgiveness. Her mother took her to a rehabilitation centre where she was treated with methadone. She managed to quit, but ascribes her success entirely to the power of God.

In 2002, she was elected a member of the district council of Amsterdam Southeast. In 2006 she was re-elected. By 2007, Laclé had married, and had begun assisting drug addicts, alcoholics and prostitutes, encouraging them to start a new life through the Op de Rots foundation, of which she is director.

== Political orientations ==
Laclé was initially a member of the ChristianUnion party where she caused considerable controversy in October 2007 by preparing a motion (later withdrawn) encouraging homosexuals to abandon their lifestyle and return to Christian principles. As a result of the controversy, in 2010 Laclé founded her own political party, the Evangelische Partij Nederland (Evangelical Party of the Netherlands), but with just 942 votes failed to gain a seat in the elections.
