= Vanessa de Oliveira =

Brazilian writer

Vanessa de Oliveira (born 12 March 1975) is a Brazilian writer and former call girl.

== Background ==
Born in Porto Alegre, de Oliveira became known in 2006 with her first autobiographical book, O diário de Marise - A vida real de uma garota de programa, which recounts, among other things, most of her life as a sex worker. The book was translated in English and Italian and released in Latin America, Portugal, Italy and in the United States. In the following years, she became the author of five other books that discuss sex, behavior, relationships and religion. Meanwhile, in 2007 and 2008, de Oliveira also starred in three adult movies.

She is also a lecturer, a columnist in newspapers and websites and she owns her own brand of lingerie.

== Books ==
- O Diário de Marise, Editora Matrix, 2006, ISBN 85-87431-68-4.
- 100 Segredos de uma Garota de Programa (with Reinaldo Bim Toigo), Editora Matrix, 2007, ISBN 978-85-87431-92-9.
- Seduzir Clientes, Editora Matrix, 2008, ISBN 978-85-7788-024-9.
- Ele te Traiu? Problema Dele!, Editora Matrix, 2009, ISBN 978-85-7788-127-7.
- Reunião de Bruxas, Editora Anubis, 2011, ISBN 978-85-8645-331-1.
- Psicopatas do Coração, Editora Urbanas, 2012, ISBN 978-85-6353-676-1.

== Filmography ==
- 2007 - Vanessa de Oliveira
- 2008 - A Dama de Vermelho
- 2008 - Gostosa, Safada e
