= Morgane Merteuil =

French feminist

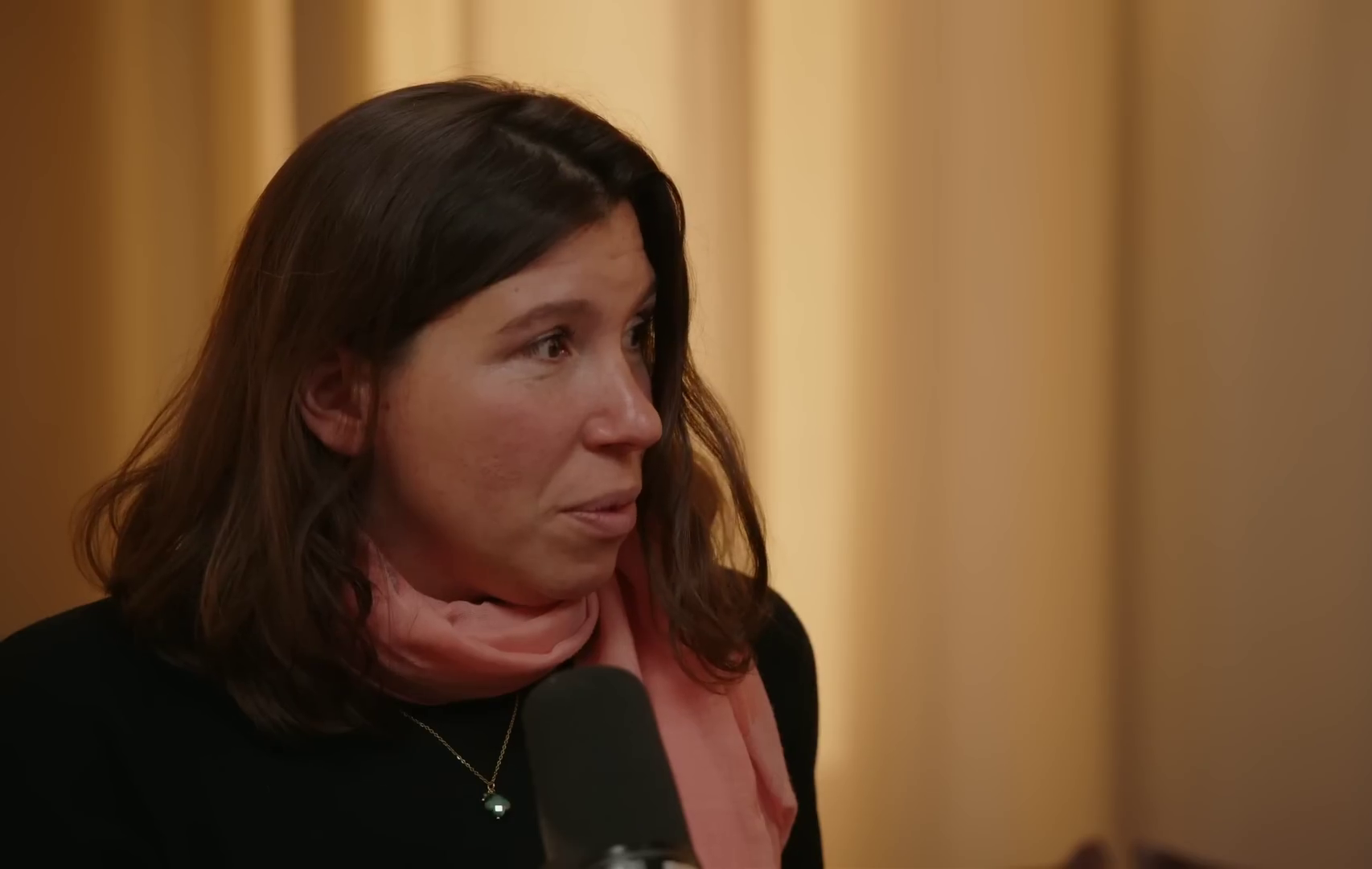
- Morgane Merteuil in 2025.
- Born: 1986 (age 39–40)
- Occupations: Sex worker Activist
- Known for: STRASS spokesperson 8 mars pour touTEs co-founder

Morgane Merteuil (French pronunciation: [mɔʁɡan mɛʁtœj]; born 1986) is the pseudonym of a French sex worker and feminist activist known for her commitment to the rights of sex workers. She was the secretary general and spokesperson of the French sex work union STRASS from 2011 to 2016.

== Biography ==
Merteuil holds a Master's degree in Humanities from the University of Grenoble. While studying she held several jobs including childcare, cleaning, newspaper distribution and posing for erotic pictures. In 2009, while working as a bar hostess, Merteuil realized that she could become a sex worker to finance her studies, and decided to become an escort. She claimed this was a "constrained" choice in an article in Le Monde (25 November 2011), preferring "to be an escort rather than working in a factory for 40 hours a week", adding that "people who have extremely difficult days working in construction or in the hospitality industry would no doubt also say that they also made a forced choice."

After encountering abolitionist moves against prostitution, Merteuil joined the sex work union STRASS. In June 2011, she became their secretary general and spokesperson. STRASS actively opposes "whorephobia" and campaigned against the proposed 2016 law to criminalize the clients of prostitution, denouncing the law for "promoting insecurity and rape." It argued that the effect of the law would be that "those who can afford to will go and work in neighboring countries, others will seek intermediaries who will play the role of pimps", and that the law would favor procuring. Under Merteuil's leadership, STRASS developed links with other unions.

In 2012, Merteuil published an essay entitled Libérez le féminisme!, in which she accused media feminist associations such as Ni Putes Ni Soumises, Osez le féminisme! and Les Chiennes de garde of being "gentrified", and castigated these "ambassadors of liberty" for imposing their "own conception of dignity" on others. In July 2012, she was invited to appear on Le Grand Journal on Canal+ to discuss this with Thalia Breton from Osez le Feminisme.

As co-founder of 8 mars pour toutTEs, Merteuil organized a demonstration to defend prostitution in March 2014.

In February 2015, during the Affaire du Carlton de Lille trial, she expressed regret that the case was not centered "on the seriousness of the violence in certain actions."

In April 2016, Merteuil claimed that 15% of prostitutes in France are of foreign origin.

Merteuil stepped down from being spokesperson for STRASS in June 2016.

== Published works ==
- Merteuil, Morgane (September 2012). Libérez le féminisme! (in French). L'Éditeur. ISBN 978-2362010699.
- Merteuil, Morgane (14 January 2013). "Homophobie, putophobie, même combat?". L'Obs (in French).
- Merteuil, Morgane (1 September 2014). "Le travail du sexe contre le travail" (in French). Période.
- Merteuil, Morgane (2016). "Najat Vallaud-Balkacem sauve les putes". In de Sutter, Laurent (ed.). Le livre des trahisons (in French). Presses Universitaires de France. ISBN 9782130787020.

== Documentary ==
- Putain, c’est pas simple! d’Emmanuelle Nobécourt, 2014, 80 min.

== Bibliography ==
- Emmanuelle, Camille (2017). Sexpowerment (in French). Le Livre de Poche. ISBN 9782253193852.
- Gil, Françoise (2012). Prostitution: fantasmes et réalités: Repères pour le travail social (in French). ESF éditeur. ISBN 9782710124429.
- Quilliou-Rioual, Mikaël (2014). Identités de genre et intervention sociale (in French). Dunod. ISBN 9782100717743.
