= Kilden – Information Centre for Gender Research =

Kilden genderresearch.no (Kilden kjønnsforskning.no) is a national knowledge centre for gender perspectives and gender balance in research, established in 1998 by Research Council of Norway and based at Lysaker in Oslo.

== Organization ==
The centre is a subdivision of Research Council of Norway, visible at the national level, with a board of directors appointed by the council's CEO. It reports to the council's Science Division. Kilden promotes and informs about Norwegian gender research within Norwegian communities and those abroad through documentation of gender-related resources and activities

== History ==
Kilden's early formation was rooted in European women libraries, dating back to the 1920s and 30s, and gained momentum in the movement to promote archival documentation of women's history in the 1970s. Contrary to what many would assume, Nordic countries were late in the creation of female libraries and archives. In 1958, Kvinnohistoriskt Arkiv (Women's History Archive) in Gothenburg, Sweden was the first to form. This was followed by the establishment of Kvindehistorisk Samling (Women's History Collection) in 1964. The 1970s saw the struggles of Norwegian feminists - activists and researchers alike - in implementing an information and documentation centre dedicated to women's history. It would not be until 1994 when Norway would finally gain a national information and documentation service for women's research, after the Research Council of Norway decide to lend support for such work. Thus, on 1 September 1998, KILDEN was formally established. KILDEN is an acronym for “Kvinne- og kjønnsforskningens InformasjonsLinje og Dokumentasjonsenhet i Norge” which, in English, can be translated to “Information Line and Documentation Unit for Women’s and Gender Research in Norway”. The first director of Kilden was Nina Kristiansen.

In 1999, Kilden's website was launched. The English version of the website was launched in 2007. Kilden's name was changed to Kilden kjønnsforskning.no in 2015.

== Strategy ==
Kilken strives to be a leading disseminator on gender research and perspectives. As such, Kilden is closely associated with academic and educational facilities due to academia most often serving at the forefront of breakthrough research on gender and gender studies. Kilden's statutes as of 5 October 2017 are available for public viewing, both in Norsk and in English.
