= Hande Kader =

Turkish transgender woman

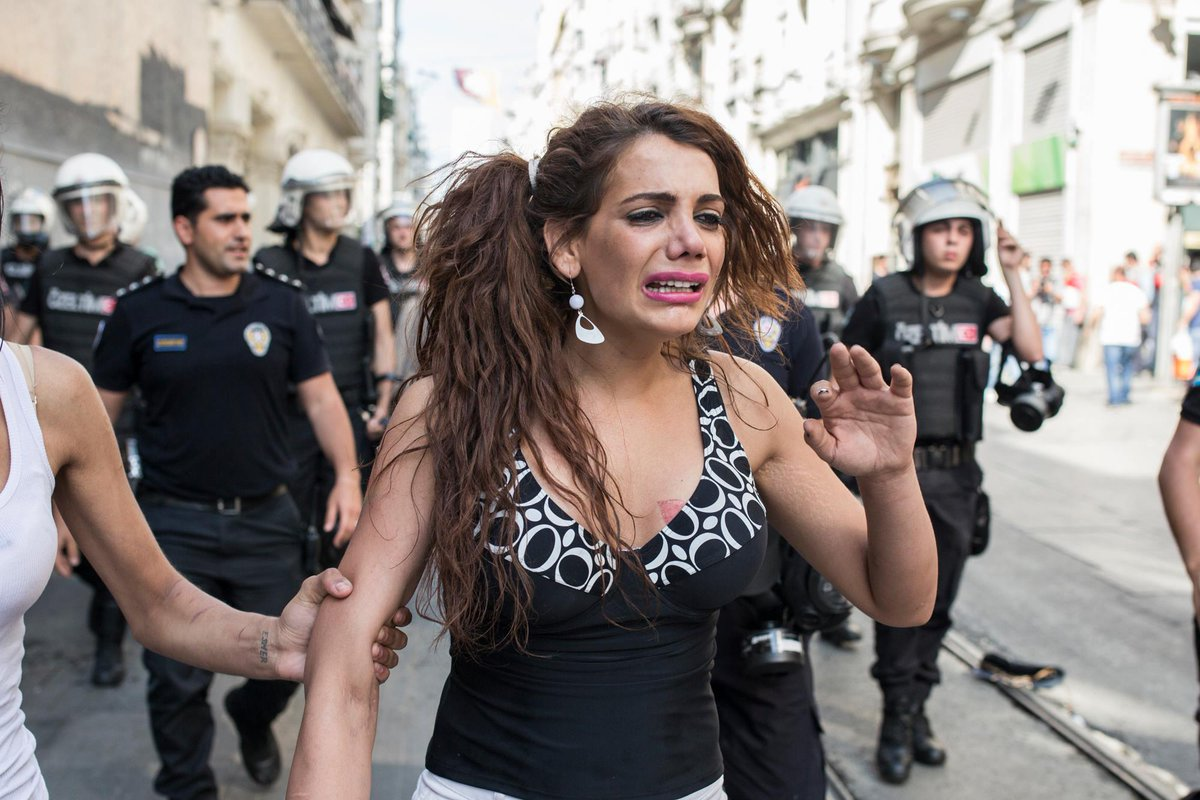
- Hande Kader during banned Istanbul Pride, June 2015
- Born: 5 January 1993; Şanlıurfa, Turkey
- Disappeared: August 2016
- Cause of death: Murder, rape
- Body discovered: 12 August 2016
- Occupations: Sex worker, activist for LGBT rights

Hande Kader (1993 – August 2016) was a politically active Turkish transgender woman. Kader was familiar to millions of Turks as a figurehead for the LGBT community after being photographed at the forefront of the resistance against police forces suppressing the 2015 Gay Pride event in Istanbul. In August 2016, she was reported missing by her flatmate when she failed to return home the following week. Her body was found raped, mutilated, and burnt by the roadside in the up-market Zekeriyaköy neighbourhood on 12 August 2016. Despite being badly mutilated, Kader's body was identified by prosthetics at the city morgue by Dengiler.

Kader was employed in the sex industry as a sex worker, and was last seen getting into a client's car. She was 23 years old at the time of her death. The official cause of death has not yet been released. Reports indicate that after death her corpse was set on fire, possibly to avoid identification of the perpetrator(s).

Following her death, there has been a public outcry and protests against the mistreatment of transgender people in Turkish society.

Boğaziçi University LGBT Studies Student Club (BULGBTİ) announced a fellowship in honor of Hande Kader that will be given to a trans student at the university starting from 2017–2018 academic year. However, the office of the president later announced that the fellowship was not within their knowledge and reimbursed the donations.

== See also ==
- LGBT rights in Turkey
- List of unlawfully killed transgender people
