= Elisabeth Gassner =

German pickpocket (c. 1747–1788)

- Born: Elisabeth Ebnerin c. 1747; Wiblingen monastery, Holy Roman Empire
- Died: 16 July 1788 (aged 40–41); Oberdischingen, Holy Roman Empire
- Cause of death: Execution
- Occupations: Pickpocket, thief and prostitute

Elisabeth Gassner (c. 1747 – 16 July 1788), née Ebnerin, was a German pickpocket, thief and prostitute, known as Schwarze Lies (Black Lisa).

== Early life and family ==
Gassner was born in the monastery of Wiblingen near Ulm, and was christened on 9 April 1747. She had a brother, six and a half years older than her, named Martin, who entered military service at the beginning of the Seven Years' War. Her father, Johannes Ebner, was a retired soldier and came from a labouring family from Thonlohe near the Altmühl valley. He died early, allegedly in Hirschbach, Bavaria. The mother was born illegitimately in Katzdorf near Neunburg vorm Wald. She died on 26 May 1782 at the age of 77 years in Biberberg. At the time of Elisabeth's birth, her parents were living as vagrants.

On 7 June 1770, Gassner married Johannes Gassner, a native of Biberberg, who after twelve years of military service in various troop contingents of the Swabia district returned with Gassner to his hometown and settled there. The couple already had two children, Hansjörg and Kreszenzia at that time. The couple had four more children; Joseph, Mary Josepha and two others who died during childhood.

== Criminal career ==
At the end of the 1760s, Gassner started to get involved in crime through prostitution and theft. At that time, however, she made her living primarily by knitting cotton stockings and by working in agriculture on a seasonal basis. Whilst living in Biberberg, she was increasingly forced to feed the steadily growing family, which included her mother Elisabetha Ebnerin, by theft. By the end of 1779, the Gassner household included eight people. A year earlier, Gassner had acquired their own small-scale farming estate though the proceeds of crime.

The arrest of the couple in early 1781 ended Gassner sedentary life in Biberberg. She first settled in Switzerland, then spent 6 months in the Tyrol with a new partner, Matheis Ruttmann from Oettingen in Bayern, before returning with him to Württembergische. In March 1786, the couple had a daughter in Bleibach near Gutach im Breisgau. The daughter was baptized Anna Maria. The couple lived almost exclusively off Gassner's pickpocketing. The loss caused to her victims from a total of 300 documented property offenses was later roughly estimated at 7,685 guilders.

Gassner was arrested for pickpocketing the Imperial Count, Franz Ludwig Schenk von Castell. The theft occurred in the chapel of the Ludwigsburg Palace, when gold currency to the value of 1,700 guilders was stolen. Gassner was sentenced to death for the crime.

Gassner obtained respite by stating at the end of her interrogation that she was pregnant. The investigation by three court-ordered midwives on 15 May 1788 could not confirm this, but the report advised that the execution of the required capital punishment be suspended until the end of the ninth month after the arrest.

On 16 July 1788, Elisabeth Gassner was executed by sword in Oberdischingen by executioner Xaver Vollmer.
