= Priss Fotheringham =

17th-century sex worker and madam in London

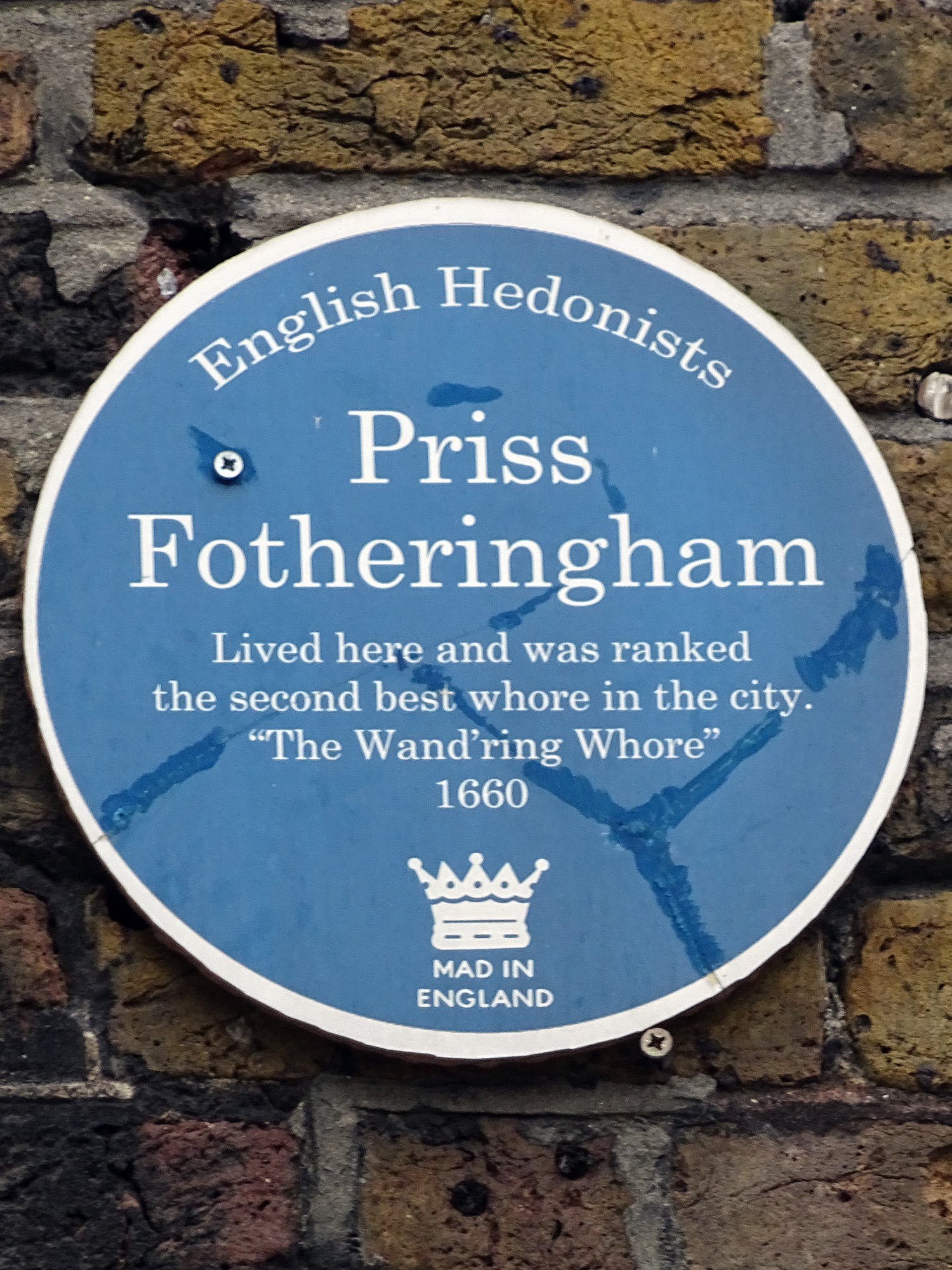
- Memorial plaque to Fotheringham on the corner of Whitecross Street and Old Street in East London
- Born: Priscilla Carsewell c. 1615; Scotland
- Died: c. 1668
- Cause of death: syphilis
- Occupations: Prostitute, brothel madam
- Known for: 'Chucking'
- Spouse: Edmund Fotheringham

Priss Fotheringham (née Priscilla Carsewell, c. 1615 – c. 1668) was a Scottish sex worker and madam who lived and worked in London and was described in a number of publications from the 1660s. One publication, The Wandering Whore, described her as the "second best whore in the city". An unofficial blue plaque commemorating her was installed in 2012 at the corner of Whitecross Street and Old Street in East London, but was reported in January 2023 to have "recently been obscured by a new artwork". As of 26 July 2023 the artwork had been changed and the unofficial blue plaque moved, so it is visible below the new artwork.

== Early life ==
Born in Scotland around 1615, she later travelled to London and became a prostitute. Fotheringham was reputed to be a "cat-eyed gypsy, pleasing to the eye". But by the time Fotheringham was in her thirties, her face had been ravaged by smallpox, and quack medicines worsened its effects. Years of swilling gin also took a toll on her appearance.

In 1652 she was convicted of keeping a house of ill-repute and imprisoned in Newgate Prison. When apprehended she was:

...sitting between two Dutchmen with her breasts naked to the waist and without stockings, drinking and singing in a very uncivil manner.

== Marriage ==
Around 1656 she married Edmund Fotheringham, who came from a brothel-keeping family. She and "Edward" had a daughter Sarah on 11 November that year. His mother, Anne, ran a brothel in Cow Lane, Finsbury. Edmund, 10 years her younger, bullied and beat her and acted as her pimp. Fotheringham left her husband for a sword sharpener, taking much of her husband's money with her. In 1658, 'Priscilla Frotheringham' was bound over by a Middlesex Justice of the Peace,

For being a notorious strumpet, a common field walker and one that hath undone several men by giving them the foul disease, for keeping the husband of Susan Slaughter from her ever since December last and hath utterly undone that family, and also for threatening to stab said Susan Slaughter whenever she can meet her, the woman being very civil woman, and also for several other notorious wickedness which is not fit to be named among the heathen.

When the money ran out the sword sharpener left her, and she returned to her husband who reported her for theft. In July 1658 she was sentenced to be hanged for theft by the Middlesex Sessions, but was later given a conditional pardon by the new Lord Protector Richard Cromwell. Fotheringham spent about a year in Newgate Prison, where she met fellow bawds Damaris Page and Elizabeth Cresswell and the writer of The Wandering Whore, John Garfield. Whilst in Newgate, Fotheringham, Page and Cresswell conspired to form a "courtesan's guild".

== The Six Windmills ==
Fotheringham eventually set up as the madam of The Jack-a-Newberry, a tavern on the corner of Whitecross Street and Old Street which was named after the main character of Thomas Deloney's novel Jack of Newbury. She changed the tavern's name to The Six Windmills, and gained notoriety through the expanding printing industry in London. References to the Fotheringham's brothel appear in John Garfield's The Wandering Whore (1660), and The Unparalleled Practices of Mrs Fotheringham (1660); Strange and True News from JackaNewberries (1660); the Strange and True Conference between Two Notorious Bawds (1660) and Man in the Moon (1660).

Her fame stemmed partly from her popularisation of the novelty sex act of 'chucking', which dated back to ancient Rome. She would stand on her head naked with her legs apart and have customers throw coins into her vagina. "According to legend, she could fit 16 half-crowns (40 shillings) in there", notes one modern commentator. On some occasions wine was also poured into her commodity. She performed chucking several times a day. The tavern was nicknamed Priscilla Fotheringham's Chuck Office, and the Half Crown Chuck Office.

As Fotheringham aged, she trained new talent to perform chucking, notably the Dutch prostitute known as 'Mrs Cupid'. Although Mrs Cupid used Rhenish wine during her act, Fotheringham would only use the best Sack wine as it smarted less.

== Death ==
Fotheringham died a wealthy woman in around 1668. Her husband had died 5 years earlier in 1663. Both died of advanced syphilis.

== Bibliography ==
- Arnold, Catharine (2010). City of Sin: London and its Vices. Simon and Schuster. ISBN 9780857200259.
- Davis, Lindsey (2011). Rebels and Traitors. Random House. ISBN 9781446455371.
- Garfield, John (1977). The wandring whore, numbers 1-5, 1660-1661 (1977 Reprint ed.). The Rota. ISBN 9780904617078.
- Linnane, Fergus (2007). "Great Bawds". London The Wicked City: A Thousand Years of Prostitution and Vices. Pavilion Books. ISBN 9781861059901.
- Toulalan, Sarah (2007). Imagining Sex: Pornography and Bodies in Seventeenth-Century England. OUP Oxford. ISBN 9780199209149.
