= Margaret Fernseed =

English prostitute, brothel-keeper, and murderer

- Born: c. 1560
- Died: 28 February 1608; St. George's Fields, Southwark, South London, England
- Occupations: Prostitute and brothel-keeper
- Criminal charge: Murder
- Criminal penalty: Hanging

Margaret Fernseed (c. 1560 – 28 February 1608) was an English prostitute, brothel-keeper, and murderer.

According to a pamphlet of 1608, Fernseed confessed to having run a brothel. The pamphlet details the methods by which she recruited prostitutes. Fernseed would "make spoile of young maidens who were sent out of the countrie by their friends with hope to advance themselves". Those girls were then put on the streets and compelled to hand over to Fernseed ten shillings from what they earned. Women who were discontented with their marriages were also targeted by Fernseed: once recruited, they were blackmailed if they refused to sleep with customers.

Fernseed's husband, Anthony, a tailor, was found dead in Peckham Fields near Lambeth, with his throat cut; Fernseed was arrested. She had allegedly previously attempted to murder him with a poisoned broth. No motive is recorded, and Fernseed is documented as having declared her innocence of the murder. Fernseed was convicted of his murder on circumstantial evidence, in no small part due to her poor reputation.

Fernseed was executed at St. George's Fields for the murder of her husband on 28 February 1608.

== Sources ==
- Donaldson, William (2002). Brewer's Rogues, Villains and Eccentrics: An A-Z of Roguish Britons Through the Ages. Cassell. ISBN 9780304357284.
- MacMillan, Ken (2015). Stories of True Crime in Tudor and Stuart England. Routledge. ISBN 9781317517085.
- MacMillan, Ken; Glass, Melissa (2016). "Murder and Mutilation in Early-Stuart England: A Case Study in Crime Reporting". Journal of the Canadian Historical Association. 27 (2): 63. doi:10.7202/1040562ar. ISSN 0847-4478.
- Swinnerton, Jo (2007). Cook's Pocket Companion. Pavilion Books. ISBN 9781862057906.
