= Sharleen Spiteri (sex worker) =

Australian sex worker (died 2005)

Sharleen Spiteri (died 2005) was an Australian sex worker who became the focus of significant media and government attention in New South Wales, after revealing on the television programme 60 Minutes in 1989 that she sometimes had sex with clients without revealing her HIV-positive status or using condoms.

After the 60 Minutes programme went to air, Spiteri was forcibly detained by New South Wales Police and Health Department authorities, using an obscure section of the Public Health Act (Section 32a), originally intended for the control of tuberculosis. She was kept in detention in Prince Henry Hospital's AIDS ward, and then Rozelle Mental Hospital for several weeks.

Into the early 1990s Spiteri's case continued to spark national public debate. A new law was introduced in New South Wales, colloquially known as "Sharleen's Law" where informed consent prior to sexual intercourse was required.

Although there were many other sex workers in the community who were also HIV-positive, in similar situations and known to authorities, after her initial release Spiteri came under subsequent public health orders (as well as other agreements undisclosed by the NSW Health Department), spending much of the remaining 16 years of her life under supervision of health workers as a public patient of the NSW Health system.

== Journalism, Moral Panic and the Public Interest ==
In 2015, Tom Morton and Eurydice Aroney, both journalists and lecturers at the University of Technology Sydney, published Journalism, Moral Panic and the Public Interest - The Case of Sharleen Spiteri. The paper questioned the ethics of the reporting of Spiteri's case.
