= Tulasa Thapa =

Human Trafficking Victim

- Born: 1970; Thankot, Nepal
- Died: 1995 (aged 24–25)
- Cause of death: Tuberculosis

Tulasa Thapa (Nepali: तुलसा थापा, 1970–1995) was a Nepali girl who was kidnapped from her home village of Thankot near Kathmandu in 1982 at the age of 13, smuggled into Mumbai via the border town of Birganj in Parsa District, and sold into prostitution. She was systematically beaten into submission, then repeatedly raped to make her fit for the trade. She was sold to three different brothels in Mumbai, at prices ranging from 5000 to 7000 rupees. In addition to the sex work she was forced to do in the brothel at a minimum of three customers per night (with an average of eight), she was sent to various city hotels dressed in European-style clothes to entertain customers for 180 rupees per night until at last a hotel manager reported her to the police. Following the public outcry, the governments of India and Nepal signed a 1985 cooperation agreement addressing the rescue and repatriation of Nepali girls trafficked into brothels in India.

== Rescue ==
Ten months later, in November 1982, when she was brought to Bombay's JJ Hospital, she was suffering from three types of sexually transmitted diseases, genital warts, and brain tuberculosis which left her spastic, and finally led to her death. The People's Health Organisation embarked on a full-fledged "Save Tulasa" campaign, and with the support of the media managed to rescue her. At the hospital, Tulasa was given police protection against possible reprisals from the prostitution industry. After a period of stay in the Dongri Remand Home, she returned to Nepal to take up residence in the Cheshire Home for the Disabled in Jorpati. Doctors evaluated Tulasa and found her to be severely damaged physically and psychologically. Over the years, she remained incoherent and rambling in her speech. She used a wheelchair full-time and complained that her stomach hurt all the time and that she could not go to the toilet. Attempts were made to return her to her father, Bir Dhoj Thapa, but she was rejected by his second wife (Tulasa's mother had died shortly after her abduction), and eventually, her family stopped visiting her. In 1994, Tulasa broke her leg in a suicide attempt.

== Death and media outcry ==
She was released from her institution in 1995, seemingly cured, but had a relapse and died that same year at age 25 of tuberculosis she had acquired while enslaved as a sex worker in India.

The resulting media outcry resulted in the governments of India and Nepal signing a treaty for the rescue and repatriation of Nepali girls from Indian brothels. In India, the sentence for trafficking with minors has been hiked from 7 years to 13. Child prostitution has been reduced by about 40% but remains a major problem and no accurate figures are available. According to Reuters (Masako Iijima, "S. Asia Urged to Unite Against Child Prostitution," Reuters, 19 June 1998), over 40% of 484 prostituted girls rescued during major raids of brothels in Bombay in 1996 were from Nepal.

In 2000, she was back in the news for a short time as the verdict was delivered in the case against her persecutors. In the first report recorded on 6 December 1982, Tulasa had named 32 people responsible for abducting her and selling her to different brothels. These included taximen, the abductors, and the brothel owners. She also named three other Nepali men, Kancha Sarkhi, Lal Bahadur Kani and Uttam Kumar Pariyar, whom the Nepal government had arrested and finally sentenced to 20 years imprisonment. Out of the 32 people arrested by Bombay police, seven were charged but released due to a lack of evidence. Only one of the nine suspects faced trial, the rest having hidden themselves away. The single accused was released by the judge on grounds of inadequate evidence.

== See also ==
- List of solved missing person cases

== External links and references ==
- Saving Tulasa, Child Sex Worker from India
- Victims of the Dar from The Hindu Online, September 29, 1996
- The shade of Tulasa seeks justice by Kanchana Suggu
- Robert I. Freidman, "India’s Shame: Sexual Slavery and Political Corruption Are Leading to An AIDS Catastrophe," The Nation, 8 April 1996.
