= Caridad la Negra =

Spanish prostitute and madam

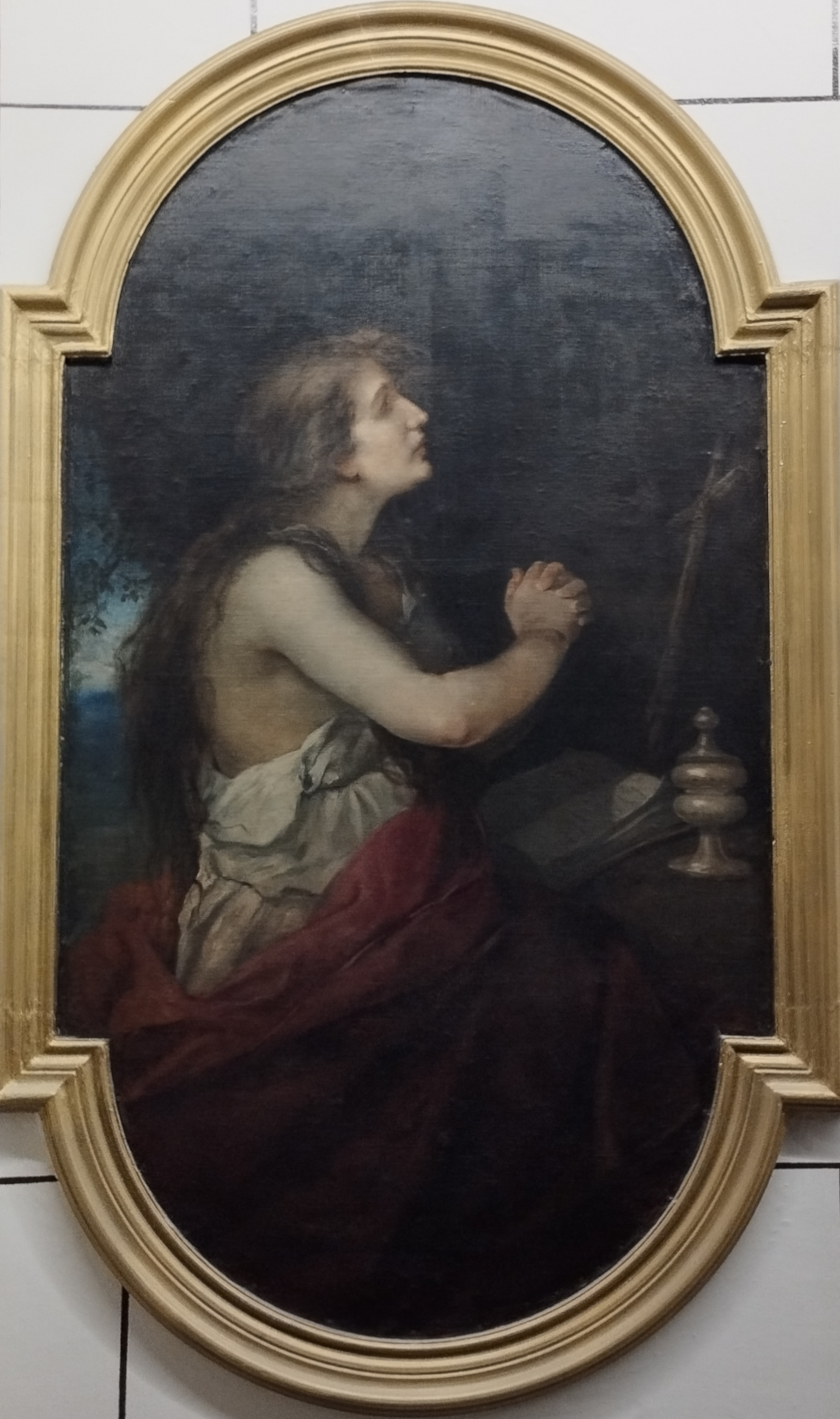
- María Magdalena, by Manuel Ussel de Guimbarda. Caridad la Negra served as a model for the painting, which is on display at the Basilica of Nuestra Señora de la Caridad in Cartagena (Spain).
- Born: María de la Caridad Norberta Pacheco Sánchez; 6 June 1879; Cartagena, Kingdom of Spain
- Died: 1 March 1960 (aged 80)
- Other names: La Negra
- Occupations: Model, prostitute, brothel madam
- Parents: Félix Pacheco Martínez (father); Rosalía Sánchez Moreno (mother)

María de la Caridad Norberta Pacheco Sánchez (6 June 1879 – 1 March 1960), better known by her nickname Caridad la Negra, was a Spanish prostitute and madam, renowned for her activity during the last years of the Restoration and her protection of people and property during the Spanish Civil War.

== Biography ==
Caridad was born in Cartagena in 1879, the daughter of Félix Pacheco Martínez and Rosalía Sánchez Moreno, who were natives of Algezares and Caravaca de la Cruz respectively. Her mother, of whom it is unknown if she was also a prostitute, served as a model for the painter Manuel Ussel de Guimbarda, whom, according to the testimonies collected by Martínez Pastor (2004), became infatuated with the then young daughter of the woman who posed for him, and had relations with Caridad with the acquiescence of her mother. Caridad became one of the artist's main muses. Guimbarda used her face to represent Mary Magdalene in one of the pendentives of the Basilica of Nuestra Señora de la Caridad. The photographer José Casaú also used her as a model, her dark skin tone earning her the nickname La Negra.

At some point Caridad became a prostitute, and saved enough money to run her own brothel in El Molinete, (Note: According to Mediano Durán (1983), it was initially located on Calle de San Vicente, and later moved to nearby Calle del Adarve. The same author also lists some trades that Caridad went through before prostitution, such as those of a laundress, ironer and maid.) in the popular red-light district of Cartagena, where singing bars and cafes shared space with brothels. The establishment run by Caridad achieved a certain notoriety, as men from the highest strata of the city, such as the local bourgeoisie, officers of the garrison and naval base attended.

After the coup in July 1936 and the subsequent outbreak of the civil war, Cartagena remained in the hands of the republican authorities. During the first days of the war, there were a series of riots during which Caridad hid many people in danger. One woman, María Davia, who was persecuted by uncontrolled militiamen, posed as one of her prostitutes. (Note: Regarding María Davia, the woman who had been helped by Caridad, the sources agree as to the wish of the crowd to lynch her, but differ as to the personal circumstances of Davia and the individual responsible for her rescue. According to Martínez Pastor, she was a "blessed" and was assisted by Caridad, while for Pérez Adán (2007) gives that she was an "activist of the fascist movement" who was saved by the communist councillor Miguel Céspedes Pérez.) She also hid some Navy officers who had fled after the pro-republican mutiny of the navy. Her most outstanding action took place on 25 July 1936, when a crowd gathered in front of the Basilica of Charity with the intention of looting the temple and destroying the works of art inside, as had already happened to the rest of the churches in the city. city. Caridad led the Molinete prostitutes to outside the basilica's doors to prevent the assault. (Note: Ortiz Martínez (2004) indicates the presence of Caridad among the prostitutes as a possibility, while Aniorte García (2006) counts it as proven.) They formed a barrier around communist councillor Miguel Céspedes Pérez after the crowd turned on him after he called for them to disperse. Finally, appeals from both Céspedes and Republican Left councillor José López Gallego managed to calm the crowd, who left leaving the building intact.

Caridad was imprisoned for a time in the prison of San Antón, and after the war ended in 1939, she was awarded the Cross of Naval Merit by Captain General Francisco Bastarreche for her assistance to the fugitive officers in 1936. In the postwar period, she became involved in charitable works, and even mediated for victims of the Francoist repression. From 1947, she regularly deposited a dark red rose on the statue of the Virgen de la Caridad. After her death, the Portapasos Marrajos placed a bouquet of roses on the statue every Friday of Sorrows in her honour. Caridad died in 1960, and was honoured with a great funeral procession made up of the humble sectors of society, and some of her former wealthy friends.

== Popular culture ==
The life and personality of Caridad la Negra inspired author Darío Fernández Flórez in his novel Lola, espejo oscuro (Lola, Mirror Dark), which was published in 1950. A film of the novel was made by director Fernando Merino in 1965. Ginés Cruz Zamora, who published his novel Rosas Negras in 2017. Author José María Castillo-Navarro wrote Caridad la Negra in 1954, although in this Caridad is not the protagonist but the owner of the brothel where the story takes place.
