= Molly Luft =

German prostitute and brothel owner (1944–2010)

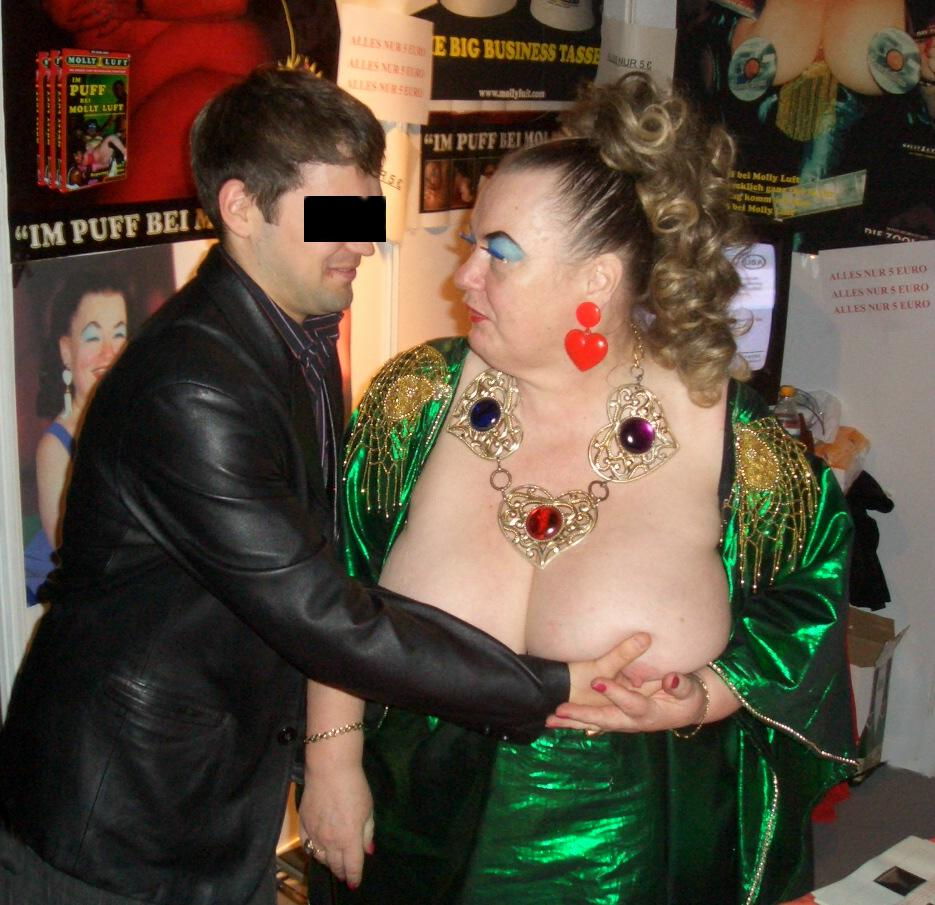
- Molly Luft at the 10th Venus Berlin, October 2006
- Born: Edda Blanck; 19 March 1944; Pomerania, Prussia
- Died: 24 November 2010 (aged 66); Berlin-Köpenick, Germany
- Occupations: Prostitute, Brothel-keeper
- Years active: 1975–2007

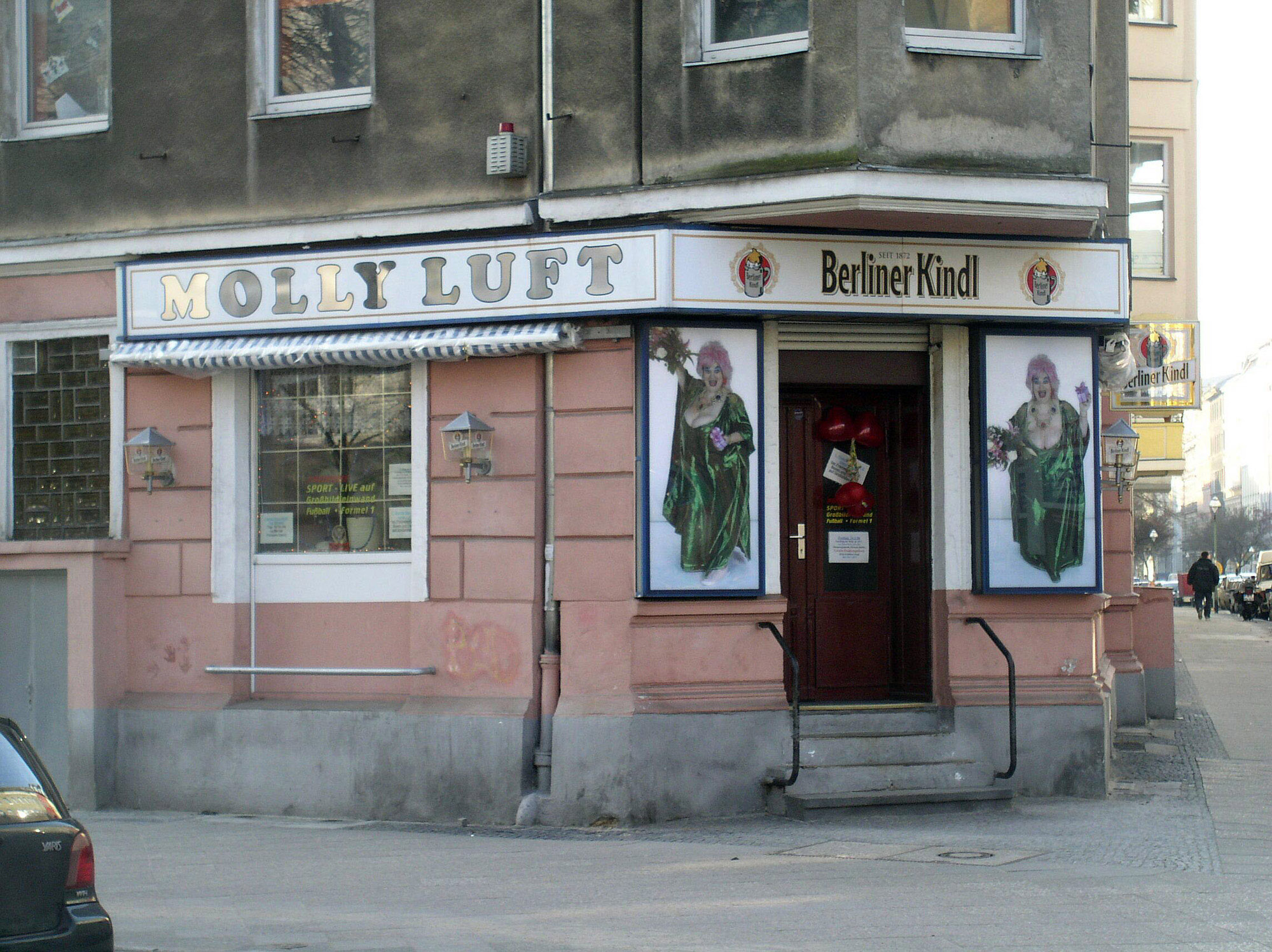
Molly Luft Bar, Blücherstraße, Kreuzberg

Molly Luft (19 March 1944 – 24 November 2010) was a German prostitute, noted for her obesity and lurid make-up.

== Life ==
She was born as Edda Blanck in Pomerania and grew up in a middle-class family in West Berlin. In 1967 she got married for the first time. In 1975 she began working as a prostitute. A year later she got divorced from her first husband and married Archibald, a United States Army sergeant stationed in Germany; two children were born of that marriage. In 1983 she and her husband were convicted of sexual assault of their daughter and received a suspended sentence of three years; she got divorced soon after.

In the 1990s, Luft (weighing around 175 kg in her prime) began marketing herself as "Germany's Fattest Whore" and became an icon of German trash culture. She appeared in various talk shows on German TV until she got her own late-night talk show on OKB, Im Puff bei Molly Luft (At Molly Luft's Brothel). In 1999, she appeared in the music video to the single "Michi Beck in Hell" by Die Fantastischen Vier.

Luft ran a brothel in the Schöneberg district for many years, famed for its low prices. In 2004, after an alleged 90,000 customers, she announced her retirement from the business, sold her brothel and opened a corner bar in Berlin-Kreuzberg. However, her new line of business proved unprofitable, and after she was diagnosed with colon cancer she gave up the bar as well.

In 2007, she returned to prostitution and started a small brothel in the Tiergarten district, but closed shop again after a few months and moved to a retirement home in Berlin-Köpenick, where she died in November 2010, aged 66.
