= Domenica Niehoff =

German dominatrix, prostitute and activist

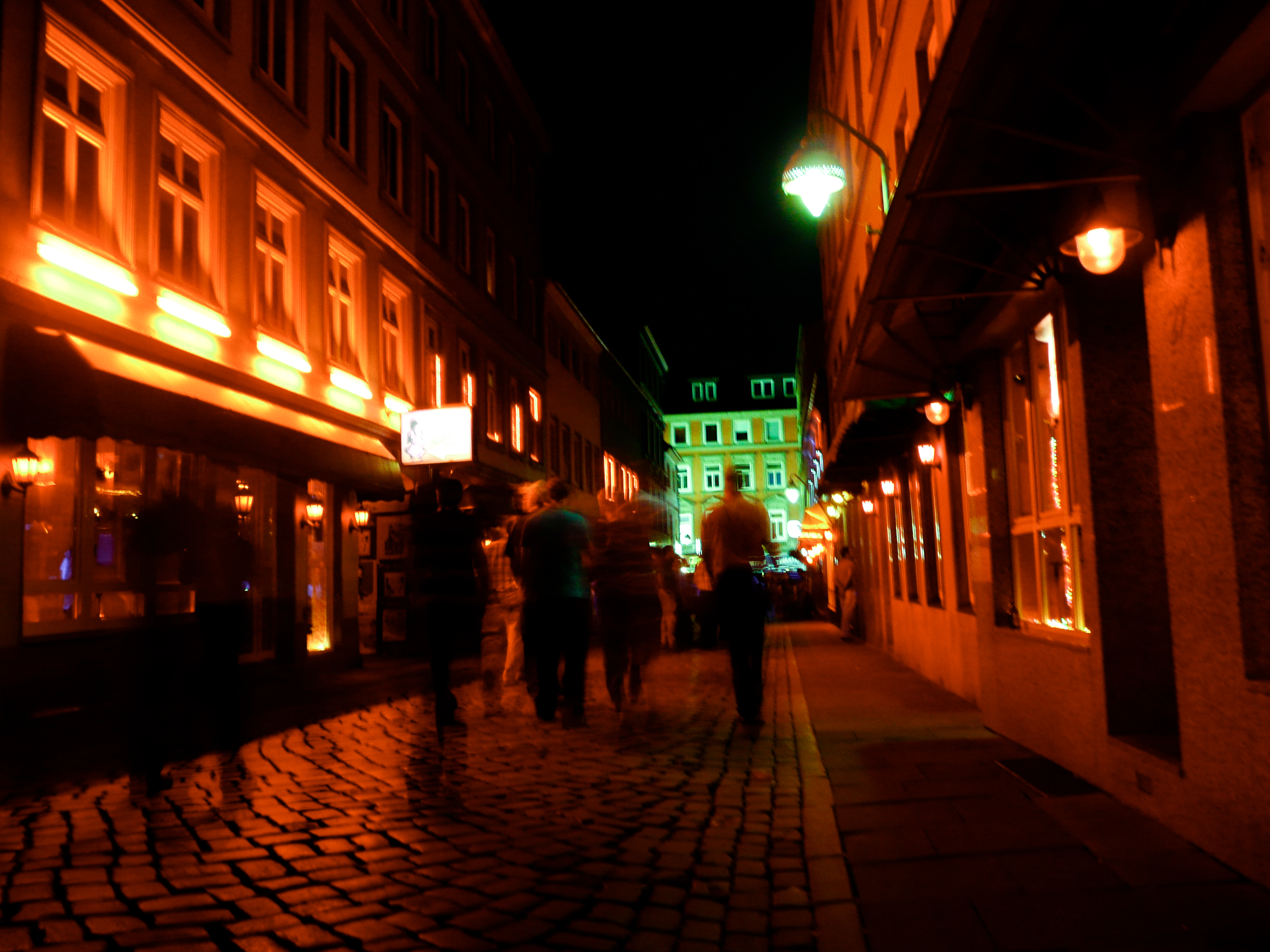
- Nightscene in Hamburg St. Pauli – where Domenica was considered "Queen of the Reeperbahn"
- Born: Domenica Anita Niehoff; 3 August 1945; Cologne, Germany
- Died: 12 February 2009 (aged 63); Hamburg, Germany
- Occupations: Prostitute and activist

Domenica Anita Niehoff (3 August 1945 – 12 February 2009), also known as Domenica, was a German prostitute and activist. She appeared in television shows in the 1990s, where she campaigned for the legalization and regulation of the profession.

== Biography ==
Niehoff was born in Cologne. Her mother, Anna, fled from her father and raised her children by fortune telling and minor crimes. After her mother was arrested, Niehoff and her brother Amando lived in a Catholic orphanage until she was 14 when she began work as a trainee clerk. When she was 17, she met a brothel owner whom she later married. Her husband committed suicide in 1972.

During that year Niehoff started working as a prostitute in the red light district of Hamburg, St. Pauli and in the Herbertstraße. Later she opened a studio and became known as a dominatrix. She appeared on German TV talk shows campaigning for prostitutes and legalisation of the profession from the 1970s onwards. By the 1990s, she had retired from prostitution but stayed in Hamburg's red light district to open a bar. A bar that she owned from 1998 was closed in 2000 when she had unpaid tax bills. In 1991, she co-founded Ragazza e.V to help young prostitutes and in the same period began to help drug addicts.

Niehoff died in February 2009 from lung disease and complications from diabetes in a Hamburg hospital. Niehoff was buried in the Garden of Women at the Ohlsdorf Cemetery. She was the first prostitute buried in this area for distinguished women, according to the coordinator of the funeral service.

In November 2016, it emerged that a street was to be named after Niehoff in the Altona district of Hamburg.

== See also ==
- Prostitution law
- Decriminalizing sex work
- Sex workers' rights

== Literature ==
- Domenica Niehoff: Domenicas Kopfkissenbuch. Droemer Knaur, München 1989, ISBN 3-426-03994-X.
- Domenica Niehoff: Körper mit Seele. Mein Leben. Aufgezeichnet von Hans Eppendorfer, Droemer Knaur, München 1994, ISBN 3-426-75062-7.
- Fee Zschocke (Texte), Andrej Reiser (Fotogr.): Domenica und die Herbertstraße. Eichborn, Frankfurt am Main 1981, ISBN 3-8218-1701-1.
- Domenica Portfolio. Grafikmappe, Schreiber & Leser, München 1993.

== Media ==
- Menschen bei Maischberger, talkshow on German television(in German)
