= Sally Lodge =

English prostitute and brothel-keeper

A genuine epistle written some time since to the late famous Mother Lodge. "Mrs Dunbo", J. Roberts, London, 1735.

Sarah Lodge (died 1735) was an English prostitute and brothel-keeper in London. She had a high-class clientele and knew Alexander Pope and John Gay but lost everything in a confidence trick and ended her life as a barmaid in a public house in Wapping.

== Early life ==
According to a posthumously published and possibly unreliable account of her life titled A genuine epistle ... to the late famous Mother Lodge (1735), Sally Lodge was the daughter of a barber and a seamstress who died in debt and left her in the care of a vicar. The vicar placed her in domestic service but she was dismissed for petty theft. He then paid £7 for her to be apprenticed for five years to a dressmaker but she complained that the work was drudgery and she was treated like a slave, so at the age of 14 she ran away and eventually started her own brothel in the parish of St Martin-in-the-Fields near Strand in London.

== Success as a madam ==
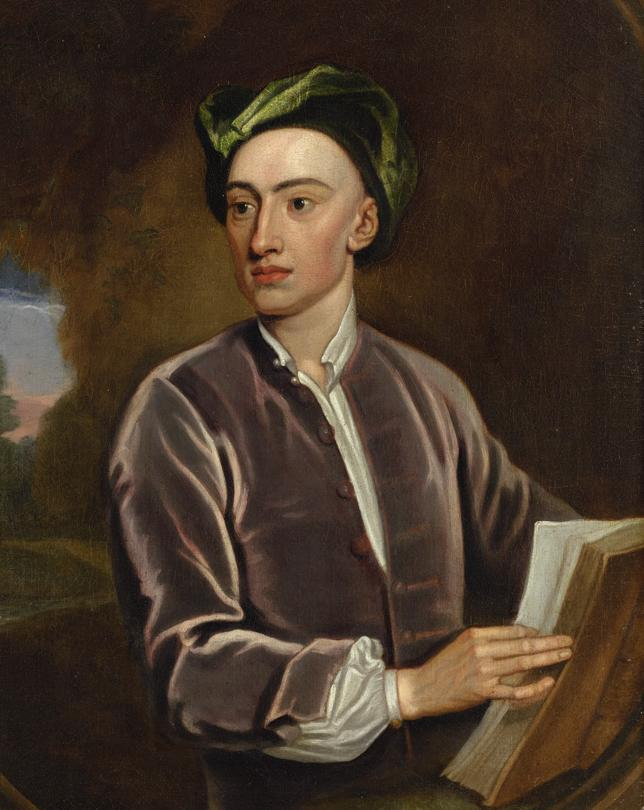
Portrait of Alexander Pope. Studio of Godfrey Kneller. Oil on canvas, c. 1716.

The venture was very successful due, in part, to the high class patrons it enjoyed from Court. Around 1720, an encomium, attributed to Alexander Pope, praised Lodge's establishment but lamented that age prevented the writer from enjoying it as he had in the past.

My Little LODGE, tease me no more
With promise of the finest Whore
That cundum was e'er stuck in.

Give younger men the beautious Dame;
Alas! I'm passed the am'rous Flame
and must give over Fucking.

== Decline ==
According to the 1735 epistle, Lodge lost all her money when she was conned by an Irish confidence trickster and, older now, she was unable to reestablish herself as a prostitute or a madam. She went to the West Indies as the mistress of a wealthy planter but he died soon after and she was sent back to London, penniless. She became a barmaid at the Whale public house in Wapping Broadway where she dispensed rum and brandy punch to sailors and died in 1735.

== Epitaph ==
The poet and dramatist John Gay, who knew Lodge, summarised her life in this way:

Servant, Prentice, Whore, Mistress, Thief, Deserter
Dupe, Derelict, Emigrant, Nabobess - final Failure.

In 1735, a biographical epistle addressed to "Mother Lodge" and stated to be written by a "Mrs Dunbo" but apparently describing Sally Lodge's life, appeared in London. It was published for her creditors to whom it was said Sally Lodge had died owing money and was stated to have been found among her possessions.

== See also ==
- Jane Douglas
