= Danygraig Cemetery =

Cemetery in Swansea, Wales

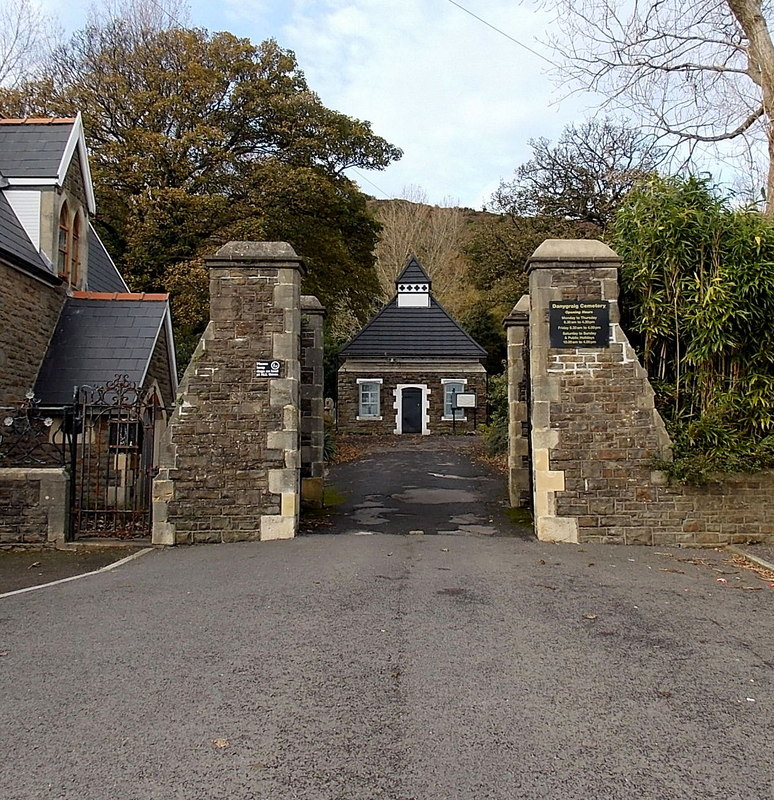
- Ysgol Street entrance and office
- Interactive map of Danygraig Cemetery

Details
- Established: 1856
- Location: Port Tennant, Swansea, SA1 8NB
- Country: United Kingdom
- Coordinates: 51.62403°N 3.91479°W
- Type: Public
- Owned by: City and County of Swansea Council
- Size: 20 acres
- Find a Grave: Danygraig Cemetery

Danygraig Cemetery is a large cemetery located in the Port Tennant area of Swansea.

The cemetery opened in 1856 and covers approximately 20 acres.

The first person to be buried in the cemetery was Father Charles Kavanagh, the local Roman Catholic priest responsible for the building of St David's Priory, the oldest Catholic church in Swansea. When the cemetery was being planned, Father Kavanagh proposed that it be interdenominational.

There are 135 identified casualties of both World Wars buried here, as listed by the Commonwealth War Graves Commission, including French and Norwegian nationals as well as British casualties.

== Burials ==
Notable burials in the cemetery include:

- George Grant Francis (1814–1882), Welsh antiquary
- John Edmondson Manning (1846–1910), English Unitarian minister
- Billy Trew (1878–1926), Welsh rugby union international
- Sigurd Wathne (1898–1942), Norwegian football international who competed in the 1920 Olympic Games. He died while serving as a merchant seaman during the Second World War.
