= Internet prostitution =

Use of the Internet for sex work

The Internet has become one of the preferred methods of communication for prostitution, as clients and prostitutes are less vulnerable to arrest or assault and for its convenience.

== Origins of Internet advertising ==
During the latter half of the twentieth century, most off-street prostitution was advertised locally using personal advertisements in the printed press or postcards in the windows of commercial premises such as newsagent's shops. As direct references to prostitution were not acceptable, the advertisements were carefully worded with euphemistic terms such as large chest for sale. In larger cities, tart cards were placed in telephone boxes.

By the year 2000, the Internet, and access to it had grown large enough for some in the sex industry to see it as a marketing tool. As use of the Internet has subsequently grown, so has the use of it by the sex industry.

In 2007 Harriet Harman, then Minister for Women in the UK, put pressure on the Newspaper Society, the trade body representing local newspapers, not to carry advertisements for sexual services. As a result, the society updated its guidelines for members in 2008, effectively banning such advertisements. As the majority of local newspapers were members, this ban increased the move towards Internet advertising.

Mobile devices such as smartphones have further increased the use of the Internet both generally and for prostitution websites.

In the Netherlands, the Internet had grown in importance by the mid 2010s as a platform for recruiting prostitutes' clients, with escort workers advertising their mobile telephone numbers online. By that time in the UK, Adultwork and PunterNet had become two of the most popular websites for advertising sex work, and in some parts of the country they had largely replaced brothels and saunas as ways to locate clients.

== Types of websites ==
=== Listing sites ===
There has been a rise in the number of escort/prostitution listing websites, that advertise for both independent and agency escorts. Some are free, while others charge to add a listing. Others are free for a basic listing but charge for some additional features. A notable example is the website The Erotic Review.

=== Forums ===
Forums were amongst the first sites to be used by escorts. With the rise of other social media, their use has declined.

=== Personal websites ===
It has become simple and easy for independent escorts to create a personal website for the purposes of advertising their prostitution services.

== Reviews ==
A number of sites have a section where clients can leave reviews for escorts. Some outside the industry regard this as degrading to the escort; however, most involved in the industry do not share this view.

The practice of posting online reviews of escorts dates back to 1999 when The Erotic Review, a review site that allows customers to rate their experiences with sex workers, was created.

Punternet was originally the foremost review site despite adverse publicity from Harriet Harman and Vera Baird (see below). In recent years, Adultwork has had a larger number of reviews posted. UK Punting, founded in 2010, is a sex worker review website which only includes client comments and has no input from sex workers.

Books reviewing the providers of sexual services in the United Kingdom have been published by George McCoy since 1996 and by 2013 McCoy was running a website reviewing over 5,000 massage parlours and individuals.

== Safety ==
A feature of some early websites, particularly forums, were sections where safety warnings could be posted about dangerous clients, referred to as "dodgy punters" (and to a lesser degree, bad escorts).

As these warnings were spread over about a dozen websites, the process of keeping up to date with the information in them could be time-consuming. In 2006, talks took place in the industry about setting up a centralised warning website that would be automatically updated from the existing websites by RSS feeds. It was agreed that a newly created website, Saafe, would carry the centralised warnings. The new website launched in January 2007. However, the centralised warnings did not work as well as envisaged and the project was discontinued in 2010.

In December 2011, Lynne Featherstone, then Equalities Minister, announced the Home Office would provide £108,000 to establish a national online network to collate and distribute information between schemes that allow sex workers to report violent incidents, known as "Ugly Mugs" schemes. This money was to fund a 12-month pilot scheme run by the UK Network of Sex Work Projects (UKNSWP).

On 6 July 2012, the National Ugly Mugs Pilot Scheme was launched. The scheme was a success and continued after the 12-month pilot period.

== Social media ==
Since the rise of social media, escorts and escort agencies have used sites such as Facebook and Twitter to promote their services. Because of its more relaxed guidelines, Twitter is the most popular. With the rise of social media as a means of communication, the use of forums by sex workers and their clients has fallen.

== Online payments ==
The rise of online payment systems have enabled escorts and agencies to take payments for services. When PayPal first started in 2001, escorts were amongst their first customers. PayPal subsequently changed its policies and no longer allows escorts to use the system.

In 2013, escort agency Passion VIP of Birmingham, England became the first agency to accept the virtual currency Bitcoin.

== Controversies ==
=== Punternet ===
In 2009 Harriet Harman asked the then governor of California Arnold Schwarzenegger to close down the Punternet website. She said that it was increasing the demand for prostitution in the UK, an activity which she described as degrading to women and which she said was putting them at risk. Punternet is hosted in California, despite being a review site for prostitution in the UK. Harman's actions did not result in the website being closed down; instead it received an increase in traffic due to the publicity generated. The website owners thanked Harman for the increase in business.

In January 2010 at a Westminster Hall debate on Violence against Women, then Solicitor General Vera Baird again called for the site to be taken down.

In 2018 Trishna Datta, an outreach worker from Ilford, Essex, launched a petition to have the Punternet website taken down. She said that website lacked adequate safety measures to ensure details which could put sex workers in danger were not revealed. Additionally she expressed concern that some of the sex workers reviewed on the site might be underage or victims of trafficking or sexual assault. Punternet commented that they would report underage prostitutes to the authorities, and that they encourage customers to report underage prostitutes and victims of trafficking to Crimestoppers UK.

=== Bogus escort agencies scam ===
In 2010, Suffolk Trading standards started Operation Troy, targeting bogus online escort agencies. These agencies promised large earnings in an effort to recruit escorts. A registration fee was charged to those wanting to join, but no work materialised.

In July 2013, six members of the gang running this scam were jailed. The leader, Toni Muldoon, was sentenced to seven and a half years. It was estimated the scam netted £5.7m from 14,000 victims.

=== Adultwork ===
AdultWork is a UK website which allows sex workers to specify the services they provide before being booked for a job. The site is funded by sex workers, who pay to have their profiles displayed. In February 2014, an unnamed Northern Irish woman successfully sued the website for unauthorised use of intimate photographs of herself. She was awarded £28,000 damages.

== See also ==
- Bad date list
- Prostitution in the United Kingdom
