= Prostitution in the United Kingdom =

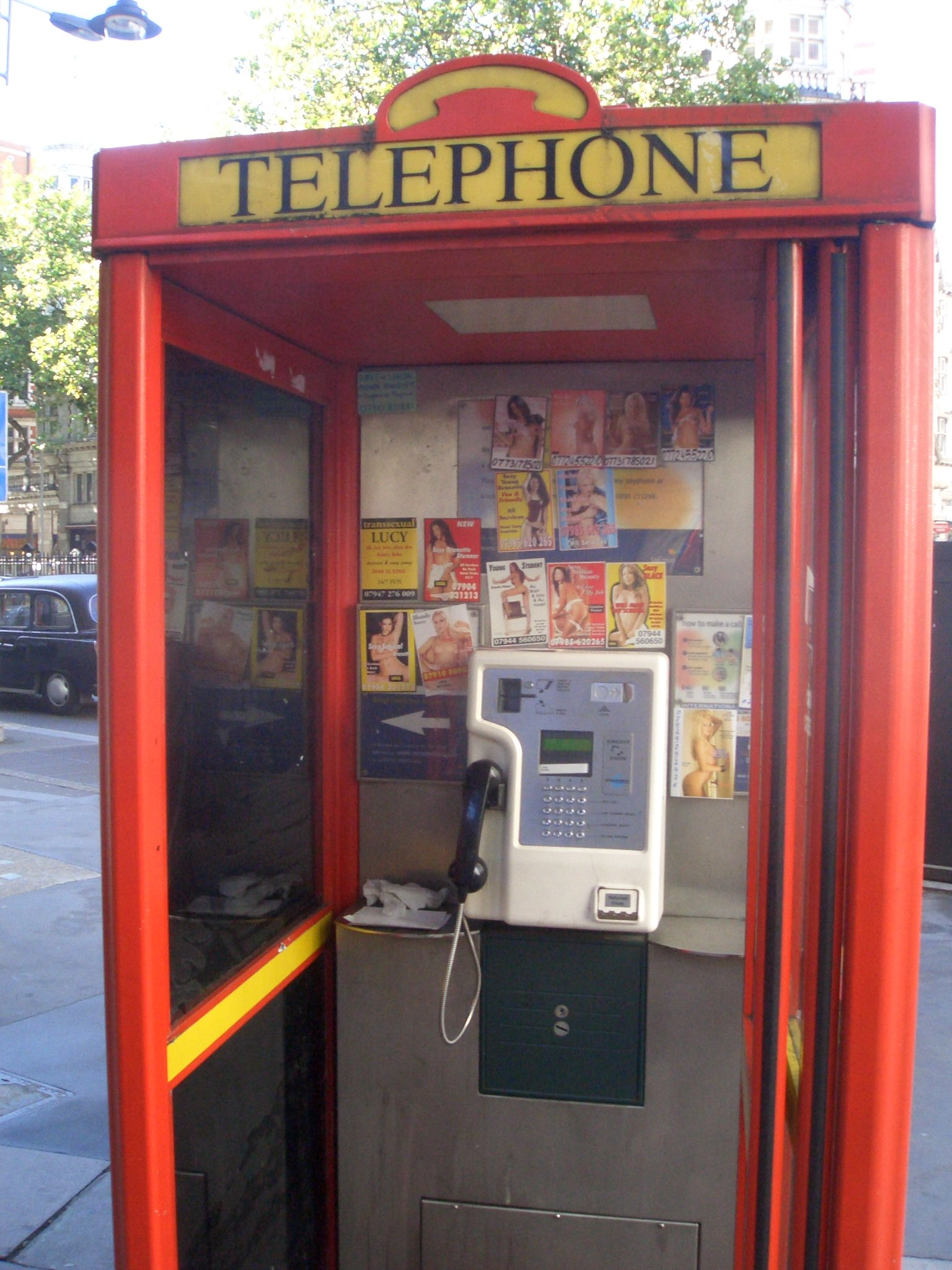
"Tart cards" in phone boxes advertise the services of call girls in London (an illegal, but once common practice).

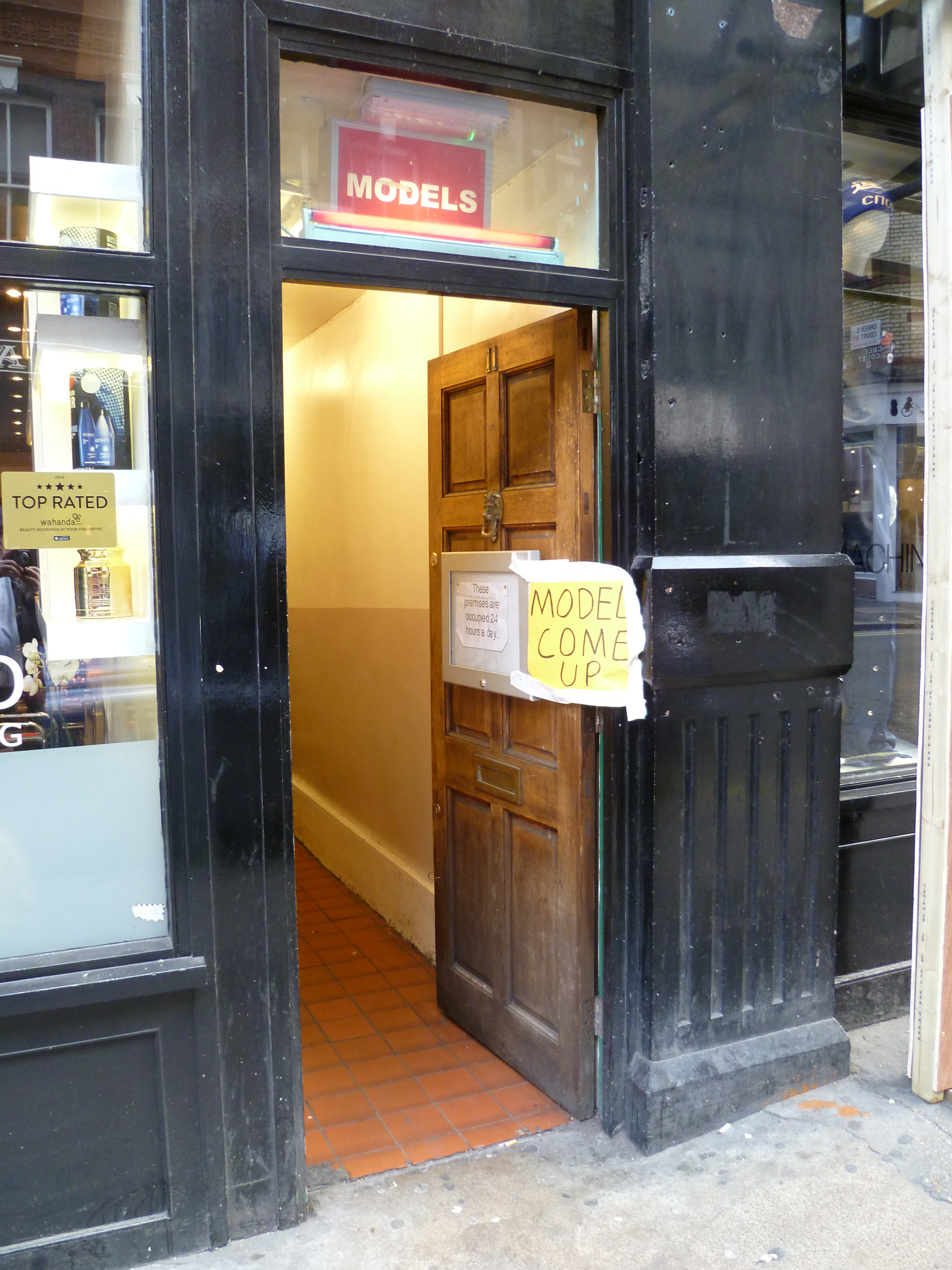
A doorway advertising "Models" in Brewer Street, Soho, London, an example of a Soho walk-up

In Great Britain (England, Wales and Scotland), the act of engaging in prostitution or exchanging various sexual services for money is legal, but a number of related activities, including soliciting in a public place, kerb crawling, owning or managing a brothel, and pimping, are illegal. In Northern Ireland, which previously had similar laws, paying for sex became illegal from 1 June 2015.

Though laws regulating sex work exist, they are not always strictly enforced, with some reports in March 2016 of police forces turning a blind eye to brothels. Since then, however, there have been reports of crackdowns on brothels in the UK. Many brothels in cities such as Manchester, London and Cardiff operate under the guise of "massage parlours".

Although the age of consent is 16 throughout the United Kingdom, it is illegal to buy sex from a person under 18 where the perpetrator does not reasonably believe they are 18 or over. In England and Wales, it is an offence to pay for sex with a sex worker who has been "subjected to force", constituting a strict liability offence – wherein the client of a sex worker can be prosecuted for the offence, even in the absence of fault or criminal intent to force a sex worker to provide sexual services for them.

== Extent ==
The total number of prostitutes in the United Kingdom is not known exactly and is difficult to assess. At the beginning of the 21st century a rough estimate of 80,000 was widely quoted. In 2009, authorities and NGOs estimated that about 100,000 persons in the country were engaged in prostitution. Research published in 2015 indicated that there were about 72,800 sex workers in the UK; 88% were women, 6% men and 4% transgender men and women. According to a 2009 study by TAMPEP, of all prostitutes in the UK, 41% were foreign; however, in London this percentage was 80%. The total number of migrant prostitutes was significantly lower than in other Western countries, such as Spain and Italy, where 90% of all prostitutes were migrants. The migrant prostitutes came from: Central Europe (includes Austria, Poland, Hungary, Slovakia and Czech Republic) 43%, the Baltic states 10%, Eastern Europe (includes Romania and Bulgaria) 7%, the Balkans 4%, other EU countries 16%, Latin America 10%, Asia 7%, Africa 2%, North America 1%. Thirty-five different countries of origin were identified. According to data from the Office for National Statistics, prostitution contributed £5.3 billion to the UK economy in 2009. In 2015, the HMRC set up a dedicated "adult entertainment task force" to collect unpaid income tax from, among others, online escort agencies.

The sex trade in the UK takes diverse forms, including street prostitution, escort prostitution and prostitution conducted from premises. The premises used include massage parlours, saunas, private flats and Soho walk-ups. In 2003, undercover police visited the lap dancing club Spearmint Rhino on Tottenham Court Road in London and claimed that it was a front for prostitution. In 2008, a study compiled by the Poppy Project found brothels in all 33 London local authority areas. Westminster had the highest number with 71, compared with 8 in Southwark. For this study the researchers had posed as potential customers and had telephoned 921 brothels that had advertised in local newspapers. The researchers estimated that the brothels generated between £50m and £130m a year. Many brothels operated through legitimate businesses which were licensed as saunas or massage parlours. However, the vast majority were in private flats in residential areas. The report found 77 different ethnicities among the prostitutes. The study has been called "the most comprehensive study ever conducted into UK brothels" but its methodology has been criticised, and it has been rejected by sex workers' activists and academic studies. Brothels in the UK are often small; Cari Mitchell, speaking for the English Collective of Prostitutes in 2008, said that "most brothels are discreetly run by two or three women, sometimes with a receptionist, or one woman, usually an ex-sex worker who employs two or three others". There were 55 prosecutions for brothel-keeping in 2013–14 and 96 in 2014–15. In 2017, it was reported that some properties were being rented for a short time for use as "pop-up" brothels, sometimes in isolated areas.

Surveys indicate that fewer British men hire prostitutes than in other countries. Estimates of between 7% (1991 data) and 11% (2010–2012 data) of men in the UK have used the services of prostitutes at least once, compared to 15%–20% in the USA or 16% in France. The authors stress the difficulty of finding reliable data given the lack of prior research, differences in sample sizes, and possible underestimates due to the privacy concerns of survey respondents.

A 2004 survey of street-based sex workers found that the average age of entry into prostitution was 21. In March 2015 the University of Leeds, funded by the Wellcome Trust, published one of the largest ever UK surveys of prostitutes. It found that 71% of prostitutes had previously worked in health, social care, education, childcare or charities, and that 38% held an undergraduate degree. A study published by Swansea University in March 2015 found that nearly 5% of UK students had been involved in sex work in some capacity, including prostitution. Most students went into sex work to cover living expenses (two-thirds) and to pay off debts (45%). About 70% of sex workers were indoor workers.

In 2016, the Home Affairs Select Committee conducted its first ever enquiry into the sex industry. Evidence submitted to the enquiry indicated that Britain had about 70,000 prostitutes who earned an average of £2,000 a week. Submissions said that sex workers in Britain charged an average of £78 for services and had around 25 clients per week. Around a quarter were said to be street prostitutes, the rest working from brothels and massage parlours. Reasons for choosing to work in prostitution included homelessness and addiction to drugs. In addition, an increasing number of single parents were said to be opting to work as prostitutes to provide for their families. The committee recommended that, given the current absence of robust data on the subject, the Home Office should commission a research study to inform future legislation.

== History ==
One of the earliest pieces of evidence for prostitution in the country was given by the discovery on the banks of the River Thames of a Roman spintria, a small bronze token, depicting a man and a woman engaged in a sexual act. Some scholars have suggested that spintriae are brothel tokens, used to obtain entry to brothels or pay prostitutes.

=== Medieval period ===
Many of London's medieval brothels were in Cock Lane, as well as the part of Southwark that was under the jurisdiction of Winchester Palace, the residence of the Bishop of Winchester. In 1161 a parliament of Henry II introduced regulations allowing the Bishop to license brothels and prostitutes in the area, which became known as the Liberty of the Clink. As a result, brothels multiplied in the Bankside part of the Liberty. They were popularly known as "stew-houses" as many were also steam-filled bath houses. The bishop was their landlord, and they were often shut down when Parliament was in session for the sake of appearance. Records of court proceedings indicate that priests, monks and friars were among their clients. The brothels had to allow weekly searches by constables or bailiffs, and could not charge prostitutes more than 14 pence per week for a room. Opening was not permitted on holidays, and forced prostitution was prohibited. Prostitutes were not allowed to live at the brothels or to be married, and they were required to spend a full night with their clients. These were the earliest laws in medieval Europe to regulate prostitution, rather than suppressing it, and they provided a significant income for the Bishop. It is thought that the prostitutes, known as Winchester Geese, may have been buried in unconsecrated land at the Cross Bones burial ground.

A series of regulations followed aimed at restricting London's prostitution to Southwark and narrowing its appeal. In the City of London in 1277, prostitutes who worked in brothels were prohibited from living within the city walls. Nevertheless, there are indications that prostitution took place in the City in areas such as Farringdon Without, a frequent haunt of "common women", and also in the neighbourhood between Cheapside and the church of St Pancras, Soper Lane, a notorious district of sexual vice including one street called Gropecunt Lane. In 1310 Edward II ordered the abolition of London's brothels.

Most other towns and cities in medieval England had brothels, and in some places the brothels were official and publicly owned. Prostitutes were generally only allowed to ply their trade on specified streets or in designated areas. Sumptuary laws were often passed requiring prostitutes to dress differently from other women who were considered "respectable". Laws varied from town to town, and prostitution in a particular locale was either regulated, allowed de facto if not de jure, or outlawed. The regulation of prostitution in England lasted until 1546, when a fear that brothels were contributing to the spread of syphilis resulted in Henry VIII issuing a royal proclamation. This outlawed all of the brothels in England and ended "toleration" for prostitutes, who were referred to as "dissolute and miserable persons".

=== 17th and 18th centuries ===
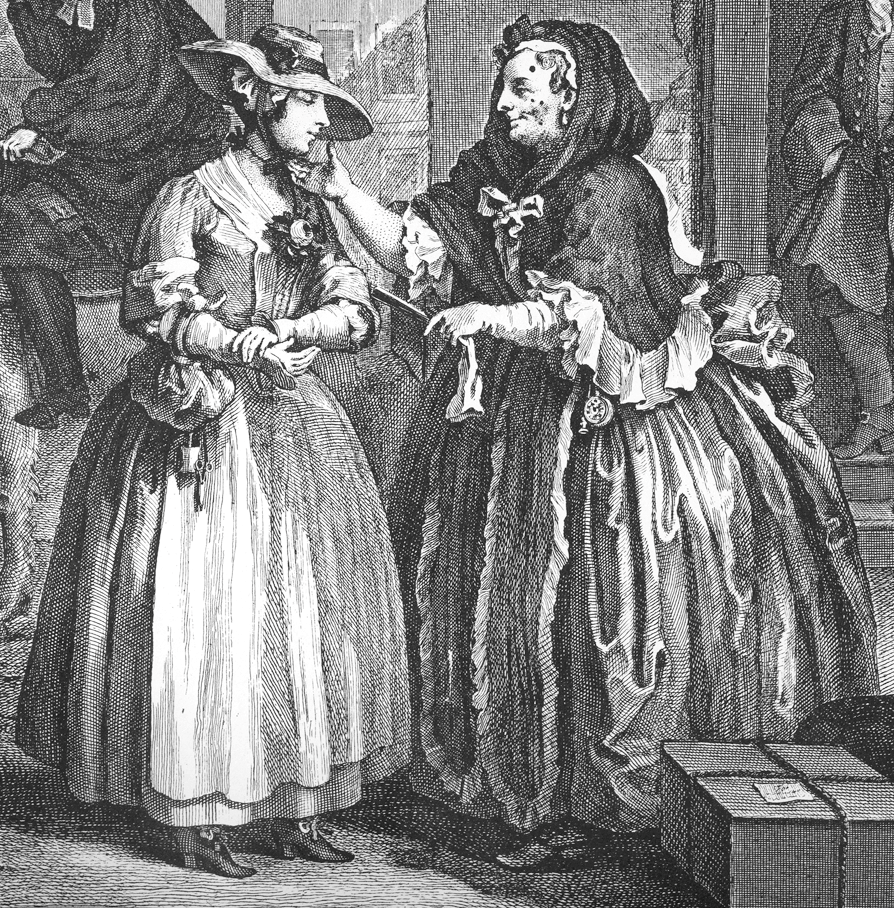
Detail from William Hogarth's A Harlot's Progress (1732), showing Moll's arrival in London and her procurement by a pox-ridden madame

The presence of prostitution in London in the 17th and 18th centuries is shown by the publication of directories. The Wandering Whore was published in the Restoration period, and listed streets where prostitutes might be found and the locations of brothels. A Catalogue of Jilts, Cracks & Prostitutes was published towards the end of the 17th century and catalogued the physical attributes of 21 women who could be found about St Bartholomew's Church during Bartholomew Fair, in Smithfield. Harris's List of Covent Garden Ladies was published in the second half of the 18th century as a pocketbook. It described the physical appearance and sexual specialities of about 120–190 prostitutes who worked in and around Covent Garden (then a well-known red-light district) along with their addresses and prices.

Bullough argues that prostitution in 18th-century Britain was a convenience to men of all social statuses, and an economic necessity for many poor women, and was tolerated by society. Nevertheless, a ban on brothel-keeping was included in the Disorderly Houses Act 1751 as part of legislation against public nuisance. Towards the end of the century, public opinion began to turn against the sex trade, with reformers petitioning the authorities to take action.

=== 19th century ===
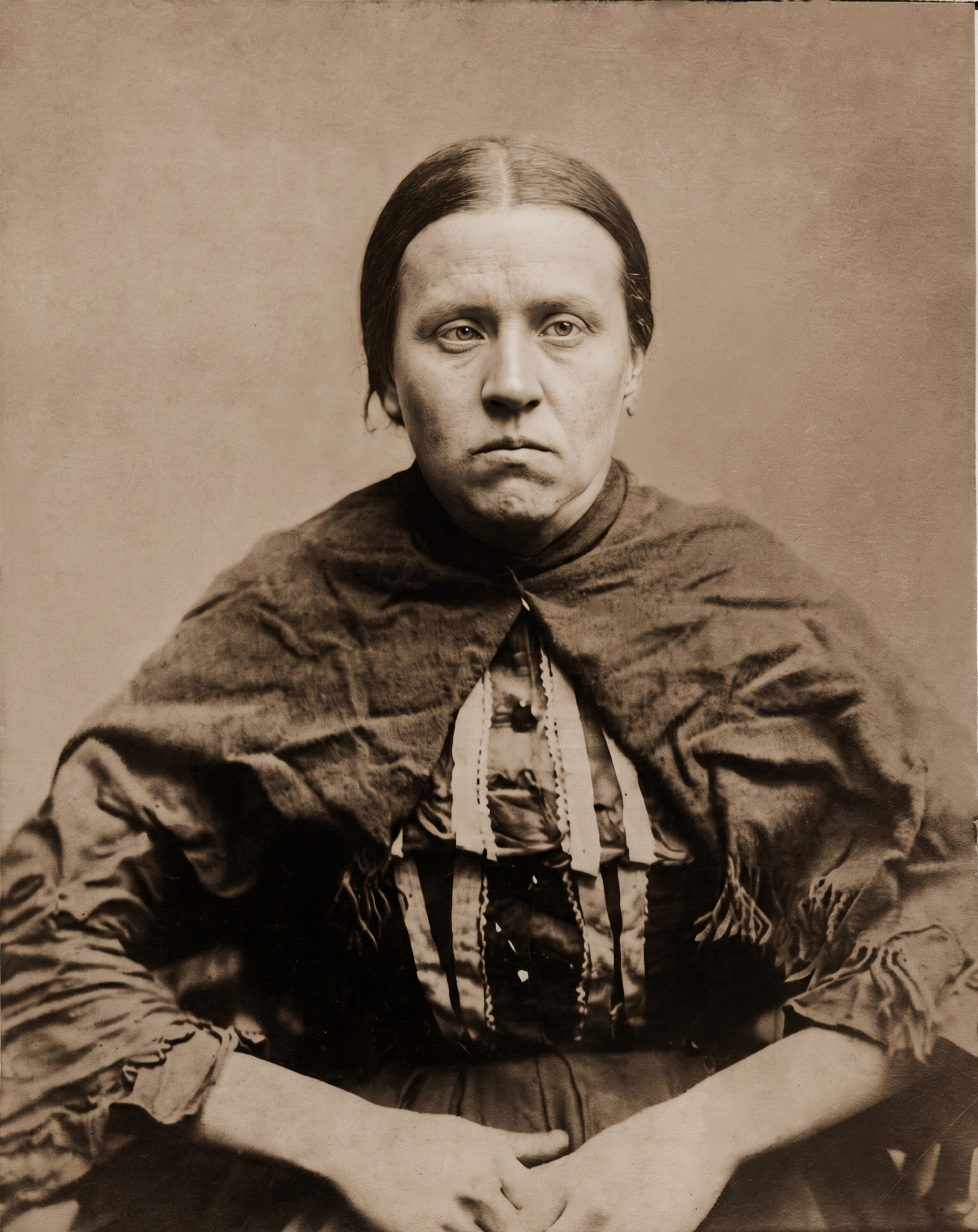
Sarah Cassidy, prostitute in Newcastle, jail "mugshot", 1873

The evangelical movement of the 19th century denounced prostitutes and their clients as sinners, and society for tolerating it. The Vagrancy Act 1824 introduced the term "common prostitute" into English Law and criminalised prostitutes with a punishment of up to one month hard labour. The act also made it a crime for a man to live on the earnings of a prostitute (often known as "living off immoral earnings").

Victorian morality held that prostitution was a terrible evil, for the young women, for the men and for all of society. One of the first pieces of legislation introduced in the Victorian period to restrict prostitution was the Town Police Clauses Act 1847, which made it an offence for common prostitutes to assemble at any "place of public resort" such as a coffee shop.

For several reasons prostitution was predominantly a working-class occupation. For many women, their journey into prostitution was one of circumstance. In the 19th century the public began to concern itself with particular social problems; conversely, a view of the ideal woman began to emerge such as "The Angel in the House". The rise of middle-class domestic morality and the separation of men's and women's activity into separate spheres made it increasingly hard for women to obtain work, causing an increase in such areas as the needle-trade, shop girls, agricultural gangs, factory work, and domestic servants, all occupations with long hours and low pay. Low earnings, it is argued, meant that women had to resort to prostitution to be able to provide for themselves and their families, particularly in households where the main breadwinner was no longer around. A study from the late Victorian period showed that more than 90 per cent of prostitutes in Millbank prison were the daughters of "unskilled and semiskilled working men", more than 50 per cent of whom had been servants, the rest having worked in dead-end jobs such as laundering, charring (cleaning houses) and street selling.

The level of prostitution was high in Victorian England, but the nature of the occupation makes it hard to establish the exact number of prostitutes in operation. Judicial reports of the years 1857 to 1869 show that prostitutes were more common in commercial ports and pleasure resorts and less so in hardware towns, cotton and linen manufacturing centres, and woollen and worsted centres. The Westminster Review placed the figure between 50,000 and 368,000. This would make prostitution the fourth-largest female occupation. One difficulty in calculating numbers is that in the 19th century the word "prostitute" was also used to refer to women who were living with men outside marriage, women who had had illegitimate children, and women who perhaps had relations with men for pleasure rather than money. The police estimates of known prostitutes offer an entirely different figure.

Police estimates of known prostitutes:

Date	London	England and Wales
1839	6,371	–
1841	9,404	–
1856	8,600	–
1858	7,194	27,113
1859	6,649	28,743
1861	7,124	29,572
1862	5,795	28,449
1863	5,581	27,411
1864	5,689	26,802
1865	5,911	26,213
1866	5,544	24,717
1867	5,628	24,999
1868	5,678	24,311

However, this table relates only to prostitutes known to the police. The unreliability of statistics in the 19th century makes it unclear if prostitution was increasing or decreasing in this period, but there is no doubt that Victorians in the 1840s and 1850s thought that prostitution and venereal disease (as sexually transmitted infections were called then) were increasing.

Actresses were associated with prostitution in the public mind, and a woman's lack of respectability was indicated by her presence in a place of public entertainment. A series of small books, The Swell's Night Guides, listed the advantages and drawbacks of various theatres for men seeking pleasure, and gave advice on how to approach actresses. It warned men not to offer them money directly, but to say they wanted to hire them for private theatricals.

Selina Rushbrook (1880–1907), a Swansea prostitute

Some prostitutes worked in red-light districts, others in their own neighbourhoods. London's dockyards had a large population of prostitutes, and Granby Street, beside Waterloo Station, was well known for its "half naked" women in the windows. Prostitutes also found work within the armed forces, mainly due to servicemen's forced celibacy and the conditions of the barracks the men were forced to endure. The barracks were overcrowded and had a lack of ventilation and defective sanitation. Very few servicemen were permitted to marry, and even those were not given an allowance to support their wives, which occasionally lured them to become prostitutes as well. Regulating prostitution was the government's attempt to control the high level of venereal disease in its armed forces. By 1864, one out of three sick cases in the army was caused by venereal disease; admissions into hospitals for gonorrhoea and syphilis reached 290.7 per 1,000 of total troop strength.

Public attention was drawn to prostitution in London by William Acton's controversial 1857 book Prostitution, Considered in Its Moral, Social, and Sanitary Aspects. It raised concerns that the city was the centre of moral decay in Britain and was infested with diseased prostitutes. Acton denounced low wages for women as one of the reasons why they would turn to prostitution, in contrast to the dominant perception among members of the middle and upper classes that women decided to become prostitutes because of an innate lustfulness and sinful nature.

The Contagious Diseases Acts were introduced in the 1860s, adopting the French system of licensed prostitution, with the goal of minimising venereal disease. Prostitutes were subjected to compulsory checks for venereal disease, and imprisonment until cured. Young women officially became prostitutes and were trapped for life in the system. After a crusade led by Josephine Butler and the Ladies National Association, legalised prostitution was stopped in 1886 and Butler became a sort of saviour to the girls she helped free. From 1875, the International Abolitionist Federation also campaigned to abolish state regulation of prostitution.

The Criminal Law Amendment Act 1885 made numerous changes that affected prostitution, including criminalising the act of procuring girls for prostitution by administering drugs or intimidation or fraud, suppressing brothels and raising the age of consent for young women from 12 to 16. This last provision undercut the supply of young prostitutes who were in highest demand. The new moral code meant that respectable men dared not be caught.

There is also some evidence of homosexual male prostitution in the Victorian period. Since homosexuality was illegal at this time, most of the information that we have comes from court cases. A few dozen report the closures of gay brothels, or pubs, but the most popular locations were the parks and the streets, particularly those near barracks.

=== 20th century ===
The Association for Moral and Social Hygiene was formed in 1915 to advocate for gender equality and aimed to abolish the state regulation of prostitution and instead punish third parties who benefited from sex work, such as brothel keepers or pimps.

In the second half of the 20th century several attempts were made to reduce prostitution. The Sexual Offences Act 1956 included sections making brothel-keeping an offence. New restrictions to reduce street prostitution were added with the Street Offences Act 1959, which stated: "It shall be an offence for a common prostitute to loiter or solicit in a street or public place for the purpose of prostitution." As a result, many prostitutes left the street for fear of imprisonment. As Donald Thomas put it in Villains' Paradise:

The Street Offences Act of 1959 sought to prevent the public nuisance of having prostitutes on the pavements and thereby turned most of them into 'call-girls'. The mass availability of the telephone as much as moral determination by the authorities made the change possible. Fines of £60 for pavement soliciting and possible imprisonment under the new law accelerated it.

The penalty for living off immoral earnings was also increased, to a maximum of seven years' imprisonment.

The publication of directories of prostitutes (also known as contact magazines) was legally challenged in 1962 when Frederick Charles Shaw published the Ladies Directory, a guide to London prostitutes. He was convicted of "conspiracy to corrupt public morals" and appealed on the grounds that no such offence existed. The House of Lords dismissed the appeal, in effect creating a new common law offence.

In a later piece of legislation, some of the activities carried out by prostitutes' clients were criminalised. The Sexual Offences Act 1985 created the two new offences of kerb crawling and persistently soliciting women for the purposes of prostitution.

=== 21st century ===
An increase in the number of prostitutes originating from overseas in the 21st century led to concerns regarding allegations of human trafficking and forced prostitution. The Sexual Offences Act 2003 included sections making sex trafficking a specific offence. A Home Office review Paying the Price was carried out in 2004. It focused on projects to divert women from entering prostitution, and to engage with those already trapped to help them exit. A second Home Office review, Tackling the demand for prostitution (2008), proposed the development of a new offence to criminalise those who pay for sex with a person who is being controlled against their wishes for someone else's gain. This approach to prostitution began to make legislative progress in 2008, as Home Secretary Jacqui Smith announced that paying for sex from a prostitute under the control of a pimp would become a criminal offence. Clients could also face rape charges for knowingly paying for sex from an illegally trafficked woman, and first-time offenders could face charges. The Policing and Crime Act 2009 made it an offence to pay for the services of a prostitute "subjected to force", introduced closure orders for brothels and made other provisions in relation to prostitution.

Some differing local approaches to policing have been tried. In Ipswich a version of the "Nordic model" was implemented in 2007 following the Ipswich serial murders. In Leeds, unsuccessful initiatives to suppress prostitution were followed in 2014 by the introduction of local regulation. An experimental "managed" prostitution zone was set up in Holbeck, Leeds to allow prostitutes to work in a designated area between 7 pm and 7 am without the risk of prosecution. It was made permanent in January 2016 and the BBC made the documentary series Sex, Drugs & Murder: Life in the Red Light Zone about the zone. The zone was ended in March 2020. Gwent Police considered similar plans in 2015 for a part of Pillgwenlly in Newport, Wales.

Due to the cost of living crisis that began in 2021, many women are forced into prostitution to support themselves or their families, according to an investigation by The Guardian. This phenomenon affects, in particular, women with modest living conditions or who are already in vulnerable situations. Many organisations have noted that migrant women, asylum seekers and women trying to leave abusive relationships are the first to be affected.

== Current legal status ==
=== England and Wales ===
The Policing and Crime Act 2009 (together with the Sexual Offences Act 2003) replaced most aspects of previous legislation relating to prostitution, although previous acts still remain in force. Working as a prostitute in private is not an offence, and neither is working as an outcall escort. Nor is it illegal for prostitutes to sell sex at a brothel, provided they are not involved in management or control of the brothel. Street prostitution, however, is illegal.

==== Street prostitution ====
It is an offence to loiter or solicit persistently in a street or public place for the purpose of offering one's services as a prostitute. The term "prostitute" is defined as someone who has offered or provided sexual services to another person in return for a financial arrangement on at least one previous occasion.

The laws on soliciting and loitering for the purposes of prostitution were amended by the 2009 act. The main differences involve the shifting of focus from the prostitutes to the customers. Before 1 April 2010, it was illegal for a customer to kerb crawl/solicit only if this was done "persistently", or "in a manner likely to cause annoyance". Today, all forms of public solicitation by a customer are illegal, regardless of the manner in which the prostitute was solicited. Kerb crawling is a summary-only offence limited to a fine.

The act also makes it an offence for someone to pay or promise to pay a prostitute who has been subject to "exploitative conduct".

The law now applies to male as well as female prostitutes because the term "common prostitute" has been replaced with "person". Before 1 April 2010, a prostitute was committing a crime by soliciting/loitering in a public place more than once in a period of one month. Today, he/she commits a crime if he/she does it more than once in a period of three months. Sentencing options for loitering available to the courts include a fine of up to £1000, the issuing of a Criminal behaviour order and the requirement to attend rehabilitation meetings using an Engagement and Support Order.

Police enforcement of street soliciting is discretionary and is left to local police priorities and frameworks. Crown Prosecution Service (CPS) and National Policing Guidelines do not encourage enforcement of the law against adult prostitutes or their clients but rather those who exploit prostitutes for financial gain (e.g. "pimps").

==== Child prostitution ====
Until 2015 there existed an offence of causing, inciting, controlling, arranging or facilitating child prostitution. In 2015, the UK Government "legislated through the Serious Crime Act 2015 to remove all references to 'child prostitution' from the law, in order to reflect the true nature of this activity as sexual exploitation". Under these changes the Sexual Offences Act 2003 sections 47–50 "Abuse of children through prostitution and pornography" have been replaced by the offences of "Sexual exploitation of children". Child prostitution in name no longer exists as an offence in the UK, but nevertheless, its legal language was substituted as "child sexual exploitation," which remains a criminal offence.

==== Brothels ====
Under the Sexual Offences Act 1956, It is an offence for a person to keep a brothel, or to manage, or act or assist in the management of, a brothel. Section 55 of the Sexual Offences Act 2003 also updated this law by inserting a new section 33A into the 1956 Act and made it an offence for a person to keep, or to manage, or act or assist in the management of, a brothel to which people resort for practices involving prostitution (whether or not also for other practices). This section provided a maximum penalty of seven years in prison and minimum of six months.

==== Prostitute's cautions ====
To demonstrate "persistence" under the current legislation, two police officers must witness the activity and administer a non-statutory prostitute's caution. This caution differs from an ordinary police caution in that the behaviour leading to a caution need not itself be evidence of a criminal offence. There is no requirement for a man or woman to admit guilt before being given a prostitute's caution and there is no right of appeal. Even if no criminal action is pursued, the caution remains on the individual's criminal record and may affect their future employment prospects; it will be shown by an enhanced Disclosure and Barring Service (DBS) employment check for the rest of their life.

==== Customers ====
Soliciting someone for the purpose of obtaining their sexual services as a prostitute is an offence if the soliciting takes place in a street or public place (whether in a vehicle or not). This is a broader restriction than the 1985 ban on kerb-crawling. It is now also an offence to make or promise payment for the sexual services of a prostitute if the prostitute has been subject to "exploitative conduct" (force, threats or deception) to bring about such an arrangement for gain. This is a strict liability offence (clients can be prosecuted even if they did not know the prostitute was forced). Additionally, although the age of consent is 16 throughout the United Kingdom, the Sexual Offences Act 2003 (in England and Wales) requires that prostitutes themselves be 18 or older, while the minimum age for clients (in law) remains set in line with the general age of consent, at 16 years of age.

==== Third parties ====
There are various third party offences relating to prostitution. For instance, causing or inciting another person to become a prostitute for gain is an offence. Pimping (controlling the activities of another person relating to that person's prostitution for gain) is also illegal. Similarly brothelkeeping is illegal. It is an offence for a person to keep, or to manage, or act or assist in the management of, a brothel. Note that the definition of a brothel in English law is "a place where people are allowed to resort for illicit intercourse". It is not necessary that the premises are used for the purposes of prostitution since a brothel exists wherever more than one person offers sexual intercourse, whether for payment or not. Thus the prohibition on brothels covers premises where people go for non-commercial sexual encounters, such as certain saunas and adult clubs. However, premises which are frequented by men for intercourse with only one woman are not a brothel, and this is so whether she is a tenant or not. Thus in practice to avoid committing this offence a prostitute who works in private must work alone.

==== Advertising ====
Advertising for the services of prostitutes has traditionally been expressed in euphemistic language, partly as an attempt to avoid prosecution and partly as an expression of British cultural values. Prostitutes have advertised in specialist contact magazines for decades despite a common law offence of "conspiracy to corrupt public morals" which was created in 1962 to prohibit such advertising. Adverts for prostitutes have also been placed in public telephone boxes (where they are known as tart cards) despite the Criminal Justice and Police Act 2001 making such advertising an offence. Newspaper advertising has been used since advertising in newspapers is not in itself illegal. However, a newspaper which carries advertising for illegal establishments and activities such as brothels or venues where sexual services are offered illegally may be liable to prosecution for money laundering offences under the Proceeds of Crime Act 2002. This is the case even if such places are advertised under the guise of massage parlours and saunas. Some police forces have local policies in place for enforcement against prostitution services advertised in the local press. The News Media Association's guidelines suggest that their members (the majority of local newspapers) refuse to carry advertisements for sexual services. Newspaper companies nowadays often adopt a policy of refusing all advertisements for "personal services".

Internet advertising is now widely used by prostitutes, primarily in the form of specialist websites. Social media have also become a common way to attract clients. An unsuccessful private member's bill to prohibit the advertising of prostitution, the Advertising of Prostitution (Prohibition) Bill 2015–16, was introduced by Lord McColl of Dulwich in the House of Lords in June 2015 and backed by the Christian advocacy group CARE.

=== Northern Ireland ===
It has been illegal to pay for sex in Northern Ireland since 1 June 2015 as a result of the Human Trafficking and Exploitation (Criminal Justice and Support for Victims) Act (Northern Ireland) 2015 which was enacted in January 2015. Previously, prostitution in Northern Ireland was governed by similar legal restraints to those in the rest of the United Kingdom. The first prosecution for paying for the services of a prostitute was brought in October 2017 in Dungannon, Northern Ireland.

=== Scotland ===
Since devolution in 1998 the Scottish Parliament has started to pursue an independent policy to prostitution which had been historically similar to England since the Act of Union.

Street prostitution is dealt with under the Civic Government (Scotland) Act 1982, section 46(1). Kerb crawling, soliciting a prostitute for sex in a public place, and loitering for the same purpose are also criminal under the Prostitution (Public Places) (Scotland) Act 2007. There was formerly no specific offence directed at clients in Scotland in contrast to the "kerb crawling" offence in England and Wales in the Sexual Offences Act 1985.

A Prostitution Tolerance Zones Bill was introduced into the Scottish Parliament but failed to become law. A number of attempts have been made to criminalise the purchase of sex but all have failed.

== Reform of prostitution laws ==
There is a debate about the possible reform of prostitution laws in the UK. It centres around the question of whether new legislation is necessary or desirable, and if so which of the three main options for change the UK should follow. Proponents of regulation argue for a system modelled on those used to regulate prostitution in Germany and prostitution in the Netherlands. Proponents of decriminalisation argue for an unregulated system similar to that covering prostitution in New Zealand and parts of Australia. Proponents of sex buyer laws argue for a system in which it is illegal to pay for sex, as is the case with prostitution in Sweden, prostitution in Norway and prostitution in Iceland. This last option is sometimes described as the Nordic model of prostitution.

=== Public opinion ===
A CATI survey conducted in January 2008 revealed the following answers:

Paying for sex exploits women and should be a criminal offence: 44% of the total respondents agreed (65% of those aged 18–24 agree; 48% of all women agree, 39% of men agree)

Paying for sex exploits women but should not be a criminal offence: 21% of the total respondents agreed

Paying for sex does not exploit women and should not be a criminal offence: 17% of the total respondents agreed

Paying for sex does not exploit women but should be a criminal offence: 8% of the total respondents agreed

An Ipsos MORI poll conducted in July and August 2008 showed that 61% of women and 42% of men thought that paying for sex was "unacceptable", while 65% of women and 40% of men said selling sex was "unacceptable". Young people were the most opposed to prostitution: 64% of the youth said that paying for sex was "unacceptable" and 69% believed that selling sex was "unacceptable"; older people had more relaxed attitudes about prostitution (men over 55 were the most accepting of buying sex). Of all the people who were questioned, 60% would feel ashamed if they found out a family member was working as a prostitute, while 43% thought it should be illegal to pay for sex; however, 58% supported making it illegal to pay for sex if "it will help reduce the numbers of women and children being trafficked into the UK for sexual exploitation".

A poll conducted in August 2015 indicated a majority view in support of decriminalising prostitution among adults in Great Britain. In a poll of 1,696 adults in Great Britain, 54% indicated support for decriminalising prostitution. The question was posed as "Currently prostitution is restricted in Britain, meaning that in some cases it can be legal but in others it is a criminal offence – for example street prostitution and running a brothel. Would you support or oppose the full decriminalisation of prostitution, as long as it is consensual?" The results were as follows:

- Total: 21% oppose, 54% support, 25% don't know
- Men: 15% oppose, 65% support, 20% don't know
- Women 27% oppose, 43% support, 29% don't know

=== Regulation ===
In 2006, the Labour government raised the possibility of revising the prostitution laws, to allow small brothels in England and Wales. According to the law that is still current, one prostitute may work from an indoor premises, but if there are two or more prostitutes the place is considered a brothel and it is an offence. Historically, local police forces have wavered between zero tolerance of prostitution and unofficial red light districts. Three British ministers, Vernon Coaker, Barbara Follett and Vera Baird, visited the Netherlands to study their approach to the sex trade, and came to the conclusion that their policy of legal prostitution was not effective, and therefore ruled out the legalisation of prostitution in the UK. Plans to allow "mini brothels" were abandoned after fears arose that such establishments would bring pimps and drug dealers into residential areas.

On the subject of local regulation, a spokeswoman for the English Collective of Prostitutes commented in 2016: "A managed zone is no substitute for decriminalisation. Some women complain that the police wash their hands of the area and they feel segregated from the protection of the local community."

=== Decriminalisation ===
Like many other countries, the UK has sex workers' rights groups, which argue that the best solution for the problems associated with prostitution is decriminalisation. These groups have criticised the provisions from the Policing and Crime Act 2009. The English Collective of Prostitutes (ECP), founded in 1975, campaigns for the decriminalisation of prostitution, sex workers' right to recognition and safety, and financial alternatives so that no one is forced into prostitution by poverty; in addition the ECP provides information, help and support to individual prostitutes and others concerned with sex workers' rights. One member, Nikki Adams, said that the government was overstating the extent of the trafficking problem, and that most prostitution was consensual. The UK-based International Union of Sex Workers (IUSW), part of GMB Trade Union, campaigns for the labour rights of those who work in the sex industry.

In 2010, in response to the Bradford murders of three prostitutes, the new Conservative prime minister David Cameron said that the decriminalisation of prostitution should be "looked at again". He also called for tougher action on kerb-crawling and drug abuse. The Association of Chief Police Officers suggested that designated red-light zones and decriminalised brothels might help to improve prostitutes' safety. Defendants in a test case in Manchester tried to use the Human Rights Act 1998 to argue that the law against brothelkeeping breached their human rights by not allowing them to work together as prostitutes in safety. However, the case collapsed in 2016 without a verdict.

In March 2016, Labour Party leader Jeremy Corbyn, speaking to students at Goldsmiths, University of London, said that he was "in favour of decriminalising the sex industry". In May 2016 the Home Affairs Select Committee, headed by Keith Vaz, investigated prostitution laws in Britain. The committee called on Brooke Magnanti and Paris Lees to give evidence about sex work conditions in the UK. The pair suggested that the past criminal records of those arrested for prostitution-related crimes should be eliminated. The committee's interim report was published in July 2016. It recommended that soliciting should be decriminalised and that sex workers should be allowed to share premises, while laws allowing the prosecution of those who use brothels to control or exploit sex workers should be retained. It also recommended that past criminal records for prostitution should be removed, as suggested by Magnanti and Lees. Sex worker nonprofits called the apparent U-turn decision "a stunning victory for sex workers and our demands for decriminalisation" and "a giant step forward for sex workers' rights in the UK."

In May 2019, the Royal College of Nursing voted to back the decriminalisation of prostitution in the United Kingdom. The decision was primarily based around safeguarding sex workers and improving their health.

=== The "Nordic model" of prostitution ===
The focus of those who oppose the legalisation of prostitution is the ethical argument that prostitution is inherently exploitative, a view held by many in the Government and the police. Additionally it is argued that the legalisation of prostitution would result in an increase in human trafficking and crime. An example offered by anti-prostitution activists is that of Amsterdam in the Netherlands, which experienced severe problems with human trafficking and crime in 2010. At the time the mayor of Amsterdam, Job Cohen, said about legal prostitution in his city: "We've realised this is no longer about small-scale entrepreneurs, but that big crime organisations are involved here in trafficking women, drugs, killings and other criminal activities" and "We realise that this [legal prostitution] hasn't worked, that trafficking in women continues. Women are now moved around more, making police work more difficult."

In 2007, Commons Leader Harriet Harman proposed that the "demand side" of prostitution should be tackled by making it illegal to pay for sex. Ministers pointed to Sweden, where purchasing sexual services is a criminal offence.

In March 2014 an all-party parliamentary group in the House of Commons issued a report called Shifting the Burden which claimed that the current legislation is complicated and confusing. The report expressed concern at the difficulty of successfully prosecuting the sexual abuse of girls and the rape of trafficked women. The report proposed the introduction of the Nordic model of prostitution to England and Wales, consolidating current legislation into a single act with a general offence for the purchase of sexual services. It also suggested re-examining the definition of force and coercion in the Policing and Crime Act 2009 and raising the age at which strict liability is established under the Sexual Offences Act 2003 from 13 to 16.

In November 2014 Fiona Mactaggart MP added an amendment to the Modern Slavery Bill, a bill consolidating and simplifying slavery and trafficking offences into one law. Mactaggart's amendment aimed to criminalise the purchase of sex ("procuring sex for payment"). In response, Shadow Home Secretary Yvette Cooper put forward an alternative amendment which called for a period of review and research. Mactaggart's amendment was subsequently dropped before the bill became law in March 2015 despite its initially having received cross-party support.

In January 2016 the Home Affairs Select Committee began an inquiry into prostitution legislation, including trying to assess "whether the balance in the burden of criminality should shift to those who pay for sex rather than those who sell it". On the subject of the "sex buyer law" (as it termed the Nordic model), the committee's interim report said:

The sex buyer law ... is based on the premise that prostitution is morally wrong and should therefore be illegal, whereas at present the law makes no such moral judgement ... the sex buyer law makes no attempt to discriminate between prostitution which occurs between two consenting adults, and that which involves exploitation. Much of the rhetoric also denies sex workers the opportunity to speak for themselves and to make their own choices ... We are not yet convinced that the sex buyer law would be effective in reducing demand or in improving the lives of sex workers

== Crimes against prostitutes ==
Prostitutes are routinely victims of crime as a result of the social and legal status of their profession. 180 sex workers were murdered in Britain between 1990 and 2015, according to figures given by the National Ugly Mugs (NUM) scheme. Of the last 11 to die, nine were migrants. University of Leeds research in 2015 found that 47% of prostitutes had been victims of crime, including rape and robbery, while 36% had received threatening texts, telephone calls or emails. The mortality rate for sex workers is 12 times higher than the national average. There have been a number of websites which have allowed prostitutes to publish warnings regarding potentially dangerous clients. In 2007, the Saafe forum (Support and Advice for Escorts) created a centralised function using RSS from existing sites. This did not work as well as envisaged and was ended in 2010. In 2011, the Home Office announced a pilot scheme for a national online network ("National Ugly Mugs") to collate and distribute information. The scheme was launched in 2012 and run by the UK Network of Sex Work Projects. It has continued after its 12-month pilot period and is still in operation.

=== Serial murders ===
There have been a number of notable serial murders of prostitutes in the United Kingdom.

- The Whitechapel murders was a series of eleven unsolved murders of women committed in or near the impoverished Whitechapel district in the East End of London between 3 April 1888 and 13 February 1891. Most, if not all, of the victims were prostitutes. Some of the attacks were notable on account of post-mortem abdominal mutilations. Some or all of them have variously been ascribed to the unidentified serial killer known as Jack the Ripper.
- The Jack the Stripper murders, also known as the "Hammersmith murders", "Hammersmith nudes" or "nude murders", was a series of between six and eight unsolved murders of prostitutes that were committed in London in 1964 and 1965. All the victims were found dead in and around the River Thames; all had been strangled; and all were naked. "Jack the Stripper" was the nickname given to the unknown serial killer.
- In 1981 Peter Sutcliffe, popularly referred to as the "Yorkshire Ripper", was convicted of a series of murders of thirteen women, including a number of prostitutes, that were committed between 1975 and 1980 in and around West Yorkshire. Sutcliffe was sentenced to life imprisonment.
- The Ipswich serial murders were committed between 30 October and 10 December 2006, when the bodies of five murdered women were found at different places near Ipswich, Suffolk. All the victims were prostitutes from the Ipswich area. Steve Wright was sentenced to life imprisonment – with recommendation of a whole life tariff – for the murders. The case received high media attention.
- The Bradford murders took place in 2009 and 2010 in Bradford. Three prostitutes were killed. Stephen Shaun Griffiths was arrested on 24 May 2010, and subsequently charged with the crimes. Griffiths was convicted of all three murders on 21 December 2010 after pleading guilty. He was given a life sentence.

=== Sex trafficking ===
In the early 2000s there was growing concern about human trafficking, in particular allegations regarding the trafficking of women and underage girls into the UK for forced prostitution. As a result, the Sexual Offences Act 2003 included sections dealing with cases of sex trafficking. Section 57 of the Act covers trafficking into the UK for sexual exploitation. Offences relating to trafficking within and out of the UK are contained in sections 58 and 59. These offences apply in England and Wales and Northern Ireland, with section 22 of the Criminal Justice (Scotland) Act 2003 providing similar offences for Scotland. The act uses a much looser definition of "trafficking" than the international definition used in the UN Protocol, lacking any requirement that a person is trafficked for sex against their will or with the use of coercion or force. Simply arranging or facilitating the arrival in the United Kingdom of another person for the purpose of prostitution is considered trafficking. Hence the act covers the movement of all sex workers, including willing professionals who are simply travelling in search of a better income.

In 2005, a high-profile court case resulted in the conviction of five Albanians who trafficked a 16-year-old Lithuanian girl and forced her to have sex with as many as 10 men a day. A 2007 UN report identified the major sources of trafficked persons include Thailand, China, Nigeria, Albania, Bulgaria, Belarus, Moldova and Ukraine. The British government signed the Council of Europe Convention on Action against Trafficking in Human Beings in March 2007, and ratified it in December 2008.

In July 2008 Operation Pentameter Two, the UK's biggest ever investigation into sex trafficking, announced 528 arrests but resulted in no convictions. A study carried out in 2011 by London Metropolitan University and funded by the Government's Economic and Social Research Council found that 6% of prostitutes "felt" they were "deceived and forced" into the work. Commenting on the low figure, Dr Nick Mai said that "the large majority of migrant workers in the UK sex industry are not forced or trafficked" and that "working in the sex industry is often a way for migrants to avoid the unrewarding and sometimes exploitative conditions they meet in non-sexual jobs." However, the ESRC survey remains controversial as its data are derived from post-facto interviews with sex workers whose susceptibility to Stockholm syndrome and other psychological traumas is well-documented.

The United States Department of State Office to Monitor and Combat Trafficking in Persons ranks the UK as a 'Tier 1' country.

== Notable figures in UK prostitution ==
- John/Eleanor Rykener was a 14th-century transvestite prostitute who worked mainly in London.
- Margaret Fernseed was an English prostitute, brothel-keeper and murderer in the late 16th and early 17th centuries.
- Damaris Page was a London brothel-keeper, entrepreneur and property developer, and one of the most successful and famous prostitutes of the 17th century.
- Elizabeth Cresswell was one of the most successful prostitutes and brothel-keepers in England in the 17th century.
- Sally Lodge was an English prostitute and brothel-keeper in late 17th- and early 18th-century London.
- Sally Salisbury was a celebrated prostitute in early 18th-century London who was the lover of many notable members of society, and socialised with many others.
- Constantia Jones was a prostitute in 18th-century London who was sentenced to hang for stealing from one of her clients.
- Betty Careless was a notorious prostitute and later bagnio-owner in 18th-century London.
- Dora Noyce was an Edinburgh brothel-keeper in the mid-20th century.
- Cynthia Payne was a brothel-keeper in Streatham, London.
- Vicky de Lambray was a 20th-century British transvestite prostitute who became a favourite of Fleet Street gossip columnists.
- Lindi St Clair is a 20th/21st-century English author, political campaigner for prostitutes' rights and former prostitute.
- Sheila Vogel-Coupe is a British prostitute who was reported in 2014 to be the oldest working prostitute in the United Kingdom at the age of 85.

== See also ==
- Caroline Coon
- George McCoy
- Internet prostitution
- Murdered sex workers in the UK
- Prostitution in the British Overseas Territories
- Prostitution in the Crown dependencies
- Revolting Prostitutes
- Sex Worker Advocacy and Resistance Movement
- Sex Workers Union
- Sexual offences in the United Kingdom
- x:talk
