= Prostitute's caution =

Type of police caution in the United Kingdom

A prostitute's caution is a type of police caution in the United Kingdom. They are issued to those the police consider to be "loitering and soliciting". Unlike other forms of police cautions, they are not regulated by statute law, but are based on an agreement between British police chiefs.

== Description ==
Prostitute's cautions can be used as police as evidence of "persistence" for the criminal offence of persistently loitering or soliciting defined in Section1(1) of the Street Offences Act 1959, which states that "the conduct is persistent if it takes place on two or more occasions in any period of three months".

There is no need for a criminal offence to be committed for one to be issued, nor is there any need for the person they are issued to admit to an offence.

Unlike an ordinary police cautions, they do not expire until the person they are issued to reaches the age of 100, making them effectively life-long. Having a prostitute's caution can prevent its recipient (usually a woman) from taking on other forms of work that require vetting, such as work in the care sector.

== See also ==
- Prostitution in the United Kingdom
- Common prostitute
