= Erobella =

Erotic advertisement website

- Website type: Erotic classifieds
- Available in: German, English, Italian
- Headquarters: Amsterdam, Netherlands
- Website: erobella.com
- Launched: 2005

Erobella is a European website for erotic classified advertisements. The platform is primarily used by sex workers, massage studios, dominatrices, and brothels to advertise services, and it operates in Germany, the United Kingdom, Austria, Australia, and Italy. German newspapers such as Die Welt and Bild have described it as one of the main online portals for erotic advertising in Germany.

== History ==
Erobella was founded in 2005. The website originally operated exclusively in German-speaking markets but has expanded in 2023 to the UK, Australia and Italy, allowing registered users in these countries to publish classified listings related to erotic services. Its stated headquarters are located in Amsterdam, Netherlands.

Erobella has published surveys and participated in discussions related to the conditions of sex workers in Germany. In 2024, it collaborated with the German sex workers’ association BSeD (Berufsverband erotische und sexuelle Dienstleistungen) on a national survey titled Sex Work Well-Being Survey. The results were covered by national media, including Welt, which reported that many respondents described their physical health positively while noting concerns about stigma and mental well-being. Bild summarized additional findings, including respondents’ calls for greater protection against violence and interest in self-defense training.

The broader policy debate on sex work in Germany, including references to Erobella’s data and industry initiatives - was reflected in the 2025 federal evaluation of the Prostituiertenschutzgesetz (Prostitutes Protection Act), published by the Federal Ministry for Education, Family Affairs, Senior Citizens, Women and Youth (BMFSFJ).

The report has been cited in parliamentary documentation and regional discussions around sex work legislation in Germany.

== Events and public engagement ==
In 2024, Erobella organized a International Sex Workers’ Rights Day Meetup in Cologne. The company has also appeared in academic contexts, including being listed in the program of the Beyond the Interface conference at York University and a lecture event at the University of Warwick.

In September 2025, Erobella's Head of Data & Research, Brenda M. Jensen, co-authored a major report on the scale of sex work in the United Kingdom. The research was a collaboration with Green Party peer Natalie Bennett. The study estimated the UK sex worker population at approximately 102,000 and documented a shift toward online platforms.

== See also ==
- Prostitution in Germany
- Sex workers' rights
- Prostitutes Protection Act (Germany)
