= List of Sin Cities =

Nickname that applies to many cities with vice scenes

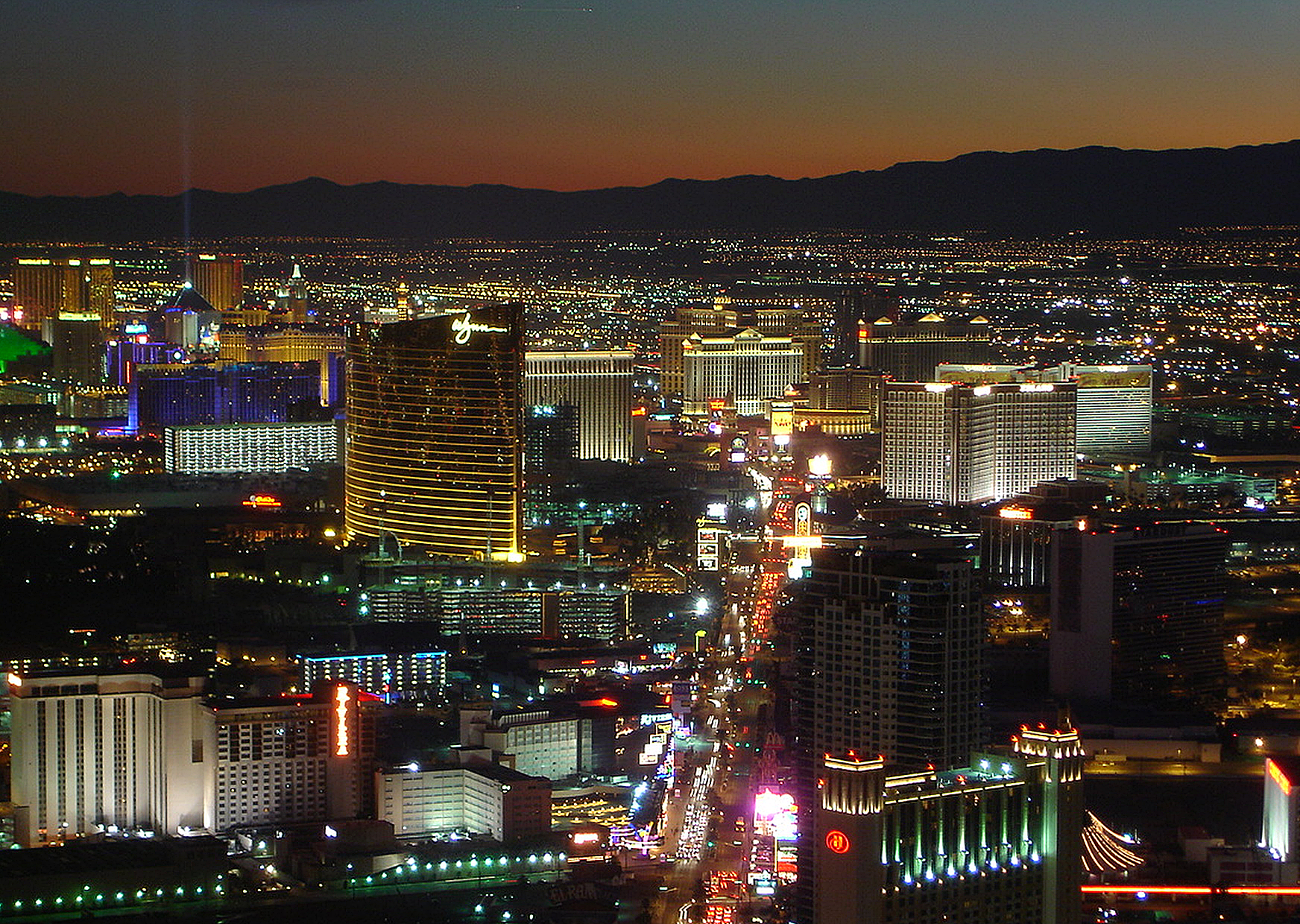
Las Vegas Strip

Sin City is a nickname that may be applied to an urban area (a city or part of) that caters to various vices. These vices may be legal (depending on area) or illegal activities which are tolerated.

Examples of such vices include sex-related services (prostitution, strip clubs, sex shops, etc.), street racing, cockfighting, gambling (casinos, betting shops, etc.), or drug use (alcohol, marijuana, etc. consumption), and even excessive organized crime and gang activity. If the city is known for prostitution, it is often called a red-light district, as in Amsterdam, Netherlands.

== Sin Cities in the world ==
Cities or areas that have this reputation include:

=== Africa ===
- Egypt
  - Cairo

=== Asia ===
- Bahrain
  - Manama (drinking, clubs, prostitution)
- China
  - Dongguan (late-night drinking and entertainment, clubbing, prostitution, brothels, strip clubs, sex shops, sex shows, sex tourism, massage parlors, sex-publisihing industries)
  - Hong Kong
    - Portland Street (massage parlours, prostitution, organized crimes, night clubs, street racing, karaoke/hostess bars and brothels)
  - Macau (gambling, organized crime, clubbing, prostitution, drinking)
- India
  - Mumbai (drinking, drugs, gambling, prostitution, organized crime)
- Israel
  - Eilat (late-night drinking and entertainment, clubbing, street racing, prostitution, brothels, strip clubs, sex shops, sex shows, sex tourism, massage parlors, sex-publisihing industries)
  - Tel Aviv (late-night drinking and entertainment, street racing, gambling, massage parlors, cabarets, drugs, strip clubs, sex shops, prostitution, scams, organized crime, police corruption, sex-publishing industries)
- Japan
  - Kabukichō, Shinjuku, Tokyo
  - Susukino, Chūō-ku, Sapporo
  - Tobita Shinchi, Nishinari-ku, Osaka
- Lebanon
  - Beirut (prostitution, strip clubs, cabarets, drugs, drinking, clubbing).
- Malaysia
  - George Town (nightclubs, strip clubs, drinking, clubbing, parties, massage parlors)
- Philippines
  - Angeles City (prostitution, gambling, drinking, clubbing, cockfighting)
  - Metro Manila
    - The primary areas for nightlife and adult entertainment in the Manila region include:
      - Poblacion (Makati City): Known as the bustling nightlife and cocktail capital of Metro Manila. The neighborhood, particularly along Padre Burgos Avenue, is famous for its lively bars, clubs, and adult entertainment venues.
      - Entertainment City (Parañaque City): Located near the bay, this is Manila's high-end casino and resort strip. It houses massive integrated casino resorts, including Okada Manila, Solaire Resort, and City of Dreams Manila.
      - Newport World Resorts (Pasay City): Located opposite the Ninoy Aquino International Airport (NAIA) Terminal 3, this area features 24-hour casinos, high-end shopping, and entertainment centers.
- Singapore
  - Geylang (strip clubs, prostitution, drinking, brothels, clubbing, massage parlors)
- Thailand
  - Bangkok (prostitution, strip clubs, sex shows, scams, BDSM, brothels, massage parlors, street racing, cabarets, go-go bars, drugs, drinking, cockfighting, clubbing)
  - Pattaya (prostitution, strip clubs, sex shows, BDSM, street racing, brothels, cockfighting, massage parlors, cabarets, go-go bars, drugs, drinking, clubbing)
- Turkey
  - Bodrum: "The Turkish Sin City", located on the Aegean coast. This city is widely dubbed the hedonism capital of Turkey.
    - Party and Nightlife: It's a gathering place for billionaires, celebrities, and international tourists to party in open-air nightclubs (like the legendary Halikarnas), luxury beach clubs at Yalıkavak Marina and private yachts.
    - Free Culture: The city offers a very liberal summer holiday atmosphere, where alcohol consumption, late-night parties and a luxurious lifestyle are the main attractions.
  - Istanbul (strip clubs, prostitution, drinking, brothels, clubbing, massage parlors, cabarets, drugs, scams, organized crime, police corruption)
- United Arab Emirates
  - Dubai (prostitution, drinking, brothels, clubbing, massage parlor, drugs, scams, organized crime, police corruption)

=== Europe ===
- Cyprus
  - Ayia Napa (drugs, drinking, clubbing)
- Czech Republic
  - Prague (prostitution, organized crime, police corruption, clubbing, strip clubs, brothels, marijuana consumption)
- Germany
  - Berlin (prostitution, drugs, brothels, clubbing, drinking, scams, organized crime, police corruption)
- Greece
  - Athens (prostitution, drugs, brothels, clubbing, drinking, scams, organized crime, police corruption)
- Malta
  - Paceville (clubbing, drinking, police corruption)
- Netherlands
  - Amsterdam (prostitution notably in De Wallen, brothels, strip clubs, sex shops, sex shows, marijuana consumption)
- Russia
  - Moscow (organized crime, gangs, clubbing, drinking, drugs, police corruption, political corruption, prostitution, strip clubs)
- Spain
  - Ibiza (clubbing, drugs)
- United Kingdom
  - Liverpool, England
  - Soho, London, England (late-night drinking and entertainment, strip clubs, sex shops, prostitution in Soho walk-ups, sex-publishing industries)

=== North America ===
- Canada
  - Montreal became well known as one of North America's "sin cities" with unparalleled nightlife, a reputation it still holds today. In part, its bustling nightlife is attributed to its relatively late "last call" (3 a.m.), a large university population, the drinking age of 18, and the excellent public transportation system combines with other aspects of the Montreal culture to make the city's nightlife unique. The diversity of the clubs in Montreal attests to the popularity of its nightlife, with night clubs, pubs, bars and singing bars ("boîte à chansons"), Latin clubs, African clubs, jazz clubs, lounges, after-hours houses, and strip clubs all attracting different types of customers.
- Mexico
  - Tijuana (drugs, cockfighting, prostitution, drinking, police corruption, strip clubs)
- United States
  - Alabama
    - Phenix City
  - California
    - Los Angeles and its Hollywood district (bank robberies, porn industry, sex-publishing industries, tabloids, prostitution (Sunset & Vine); also includes police corruption, nightclubs, drugs, drinking, strip clubs, gangs.)
    - San Francisco (organized crime, gangs, drugs, and prostitution)
  - Florida
    - Miami (gangs, organized crime, drug trafficking, prostitution, drinking, political and police corruption, scams, strip clubs)
  - Illinois
    - Calumet City (organized crime, illegal alcohol consumption, gambling, prostitution)
    - Chicago (organized crime, political and police corruption)
  - Kentucky
    - Newport is the first city within North America to be coined the title due to its role in prostitution, gambling, gangs, gunplay, racketeering, and many others.
  - Nevada
    - Las Vegas (gambling, bookmaking, easy marriage, easy divorce, organized crime, prostitution [however, prostitution is illegal in Las Vegas and Clark County], strip clubs, cabarets, clubbing, 24-hour liquor sales [as in all of Nevada]; quote: "What happens in Vegas, stays in Vegas.").
    - Reno (gambling, drinking, strip clubs, clubbing, easy marriage, easy divorce, prostitution [however, prostitution is illegal in Reno and Washoe County] 24-hour liquor sales [as in all of Nevada]).
  - New Jersey
    - Atlantic City (gambling, bookmaking, organized crime, drinking, prostitution, clubbing, and strip clubs) (Known as the World Famous Playground) (In the old days it was known also for organized crime, police corruption, and political corruption).
  - West Virginia
    - Wheeling was once a wide open city, called "the wickedest city in the south.”
  - New York
    - New York City formerly known for out of control crime, Times Square's sex shops and prostitution and barely hidden drug trade and citywide gangs, including many Mob families and police and political corruption.
    - Utica was formerly considered a sin city, and was known as the "Sin City of the East" in the 1930s through 1950s due to widespread corruption, organized crime, and political machines.

=== South America ===
- Brazil
  - Rio de Janeiro (male & female prostitution, scams, notorious prison system, police corruption, political corruption, drinking, drugs, favelas, gangs, clubbing)
- Colombia
  - Medellín (police corruption, prostitution, drinking, drugs, gangs, clubbing)
- Venezuela
  - Caracas (scams, prison system corruption, cockfighting, police corruption, political corruption, prostitution, organized crime, drinking, drugs, slums, gangs, robbery, clubbing, drug trafficking, violence)

=== Oceania ===
- Australia
  - Australian Capital Territory
    - Canberra – Canberra is regarded as the most socially progressive city in Australia; the city has long had a large and legal sex industry and a large nightlife scene; the ACT is also the only part of Australia where recreational cannabis usage is legal
  - New South Wales
    - Sydney
      - Kings Cross – A historically notorious inner-city of Sydney, although this reputation is outdated with the imposition of new lockout laws in February 2014 changing the character of the area dramatically, and arguably eliminating the only "sin city" in Australia. (Prostitution, brothels, gambling (illegal and legal), organized crime, bikie gangs (to an extent), police corruption, drugs, strip clubs, drinking, excessive, drunken and random violence.)
  - Queensland
    - Gold Coast
    - Mount Isa – known for its alcohol
  - Northern Territory
    - Palmerston
      - Gray
  - Victoria
    - Melbourne
- New Zealand
  - Auckland
  - Christchurch

== Former Sin Cities ==
=== Asia ===
- China
  - Shanghai – 1920s and 1930s (organized crime, opium dens, gambling, police corruption, political corruption, prostitution)

=== Europe ===
- Weimar Republic
  - Berlin – 1920s and early 1930s (prostitution, numerous cabarets, decadence in general)
- Monto, Dublin – (prostitution, crime)

=== North America ===
- Canada
  - Montreal, Quebec, which earned a reputation for vice through American tourists fleeing the prohibition laws.
- United States
  - Alabama
    - Phenix City, was notorious during the 1940s and 1950s for being a haven for organized crime, prostitution, and gambling. Many of its customers came from the United States Army training center at Fort Benning, Georgia.
  - Florida
    - Miami, during the 1970s and 1980s (organized crime, drug trafficking, gangs, strip clubs, clubbing, drinking, police corruption, prostitution, brothels and political corruption)
  - Illinois
    - Chicago in the 1920s to 1930s (prostitution, bootlegging, cabarets, speakeasies, illegal gambling, bank robberies, police corruption, political corruption, organized crime, and gang activity)
  - Indiana
    - Michigan City was considered Sin City in the 1980-1990s, with the proliferation of massage parlors.
    - Terre Haute was labeled Sin City by the monthly magazine Stag in 1955. (reputation for being "wide open", with gambling and a well-developed "red light district"). Now the federal death row is in Terre Haute at the Terre Haute Federal Correctional Complex.
  - Kentucky
    - Covington, Kentucky (brothels, gambling, organized crime)
    - Newport, Kentucky (brothels, gambling, organized crime)
  - Massachusetts
    - Boston, Massachusetts, from the early-1960s to the early-1990s recession years, known for the Scollay Square burlesque district and the Combat Zone adult entertainment district, Suffolk Downs on the Revere city line, notorious housing projects, the largest policy racket in the United States, loan shark offices at Bennington and Brooks streets in the East Boston district, and rowdy Irish pubs aligned along West Broadway and Dorchester streets in the South Boston district.
    - Lynn, Massachusetts, during the 1960s, 1970s, and 1980s, known for its famous rhyme, "Lynn, Lynn, the city of sin, you never come out the way you go in.
  - Minnesota
    - Moorhead known from its early years to the prohibition era for its sales of alcohol and as a saloon hotspot
  - Louisiana
    - New Orleans from 1897 through 1917, Storyville district (prostitution, brothels, gambling, and speakeasies)
  - New York
    - New York City in the mid to late 19th century and 20th century (prostitution, brothels, illegal gambling, notorious slums, pickpocketing, police corruption, political corruption, drugs, gangs, organized crime), Times Square from the mid-1960s until circa 1990 (prostitution, pornography, go-go bars, sex shops, sex shows, squeegee men, strip clubs, clubbing, drugs, organized crime)
    - Utica, in the 1930s through the 1950s for the extent of its corruption and control from political machines, presence of organized crime.
  - Texas
    - Galveston in the 1920s to 1957 (prostitution, organized crime, gambling, speakeasies, drinking, police corruption, political corruption)

=== Oceania ===
- Australia
  - Western Australia
    - Kalgoorlie – once home to many brothels and pubs that opened in the morning

== See also ==
- Grand Theft Auto: Vice City
- Sodom and Gomorrah, the sin cities of the Bible
- Red-light district
- Sin City (film)
- Gotham City
