= Police caution =

Formal alternative to prosecution in minor cases in England and Wales

A police caution is a formal alternative to prosecution in minor cases, administered by the police in England and Wales. It is commonly used to resolve cases where full prosecution is not seen as the most appropriate solution. Accepting a caution requires an admission of guilt.

== Purpose ==
A police caution (since 2005 more properly known as a simple caution) is a formal warning given by the police to anyone aged 10 years or over who has admitted that they are guilty of a minor crime. A person may refuse to admit guilt and not accept a caution, but can then be subject to criminal prosecution.

A police caution as a non-statutory disposal of an offence is quite different from the caution used for the purpose of advising a suspect of their right to silence.

The aims of the formal police caution are:

1. to offer a proportionate response to low-level offending where the offender has admitted the offence;
2. to deliver swift, simple and effective justice that carries a deterrent effect;
3. to record an individual's criminal conduct for possible reference in future criminal proceedings or in criminal record or other similar checks;
4. to reduce the likelihood of re-offending;
5. to increase the amount of time officers spend dealing with more serious crime and reduce the amount of time police officers spend completing paperwork and attending court, whilst simultaneously reducing the burden on the courts.

== Types of cautions ==
As a result of changes made by the Criminal Justice Act 2003, cautions can be administered in two forms: as a simple caution or as a conditional caution, the latter of which has specific conditions attached that the offender must satisfy—attending a course aimed at targeting offending behaviour, for example. The Home Office has released guidance to the police and prosecutors on the use of the simple caution.

Although a caution is not a conviction, it forms a part of a person's criminal record and can be used as evidence of bad character if a person is prosecuted for another crime, and Disclosure and Barring Service (DBS) checks (previously called Criminal Records Bureau (CRB) checks) for certain types of employment. A caution can cause some countries not to allow a person to visit or reside in the country.

== Circumstances for use ==
In order to safeguard the offender's interests, the following conditions must be met before a caution can be administered:

- there must be reasonable suspicion to believe an offence has been committed
- the offender must admit that they are guilty of the offence
- the offender must understand the significance of a caution and give informed consent to being cautioned.

Where the available evidence does not meet the standard normally required to bring a prosecution, a caution cannot be administered. A caution will not be appropriate where a person does not make a clear and reliable admission of the offence (for example if intent is denied or there are doubts about their mental health or intellectual capacity).

Cautions are typically administered in the case of an offence that is triable summarily or either-way. The Ministry of Justice recommends that the decision to offer a simple caution for the most serious of offences (an indictable only offence, an either-way offence routinely dealt with at the Crown Court or any offence which the sentencing guidelines indicate has a starting point at high level community order or sentence of imprisonment) be taken only in exceptional circumstances.

People aged 17 or under may receive a youth caution where the following conditions are met:

- there must be evidence that the offender has committed an offence;
- the quality of the evidence must be sufficient to give a realistic prospect of conviction;
- the offender must admit the offence;
- the offender must have no previous convictions;
- a prosecution of the offence would not be in the public interest.

On 13 April 2015, the Criminal Justice and Courts Act 2015 implemented restrictions on the use of cautions by the police:

- for indictable offences, they may be used only in exceptional circumstances, and then only with the consent of the Director of Public Prosecutions;
- for specified either-way offences, only "in exceptional circumstances relating to the person or the offence;"
- for summary offences and all other either-way offences, where a person has been convicted or cautioned in the previous two years for a similar offence, only "in exceptional circumstances relating to the person, the offence admitted or the previous offence;" and
- only a police officer at or above a minimum rank specified by order may determine where exceptional circumstances and similar offences exist.

== Administration ==
There is no statutory basis for the formal caution, it is a discretionary procedure adopted by the police under Home Office guidance.

Only the police have the power to administer a caution. The Crown Prosecution Service (CPS) does, however, have a role to play in helping the police to ensure that the Ministry of Justice guidelines contained within the Guidance are applied consistently and fairly.

CPS officers are instructed to refer to the police any case in which they consider a caution is the appropriate way of handling the offence. Where the CPS remains satisfied that a caution is appropriate but the police refuse to administer one, the CPS guidance recommends that the case not be accepted for the prosecution.

== Duration ==
Per the Rehabilitation of Offenders Act 1974, simple cautions, reprimands and final warnings become spent (meaning that they do not need to be disclosed, unless applying for particular types of work) immediately, and conditional cautions become spent after 3 months.

Cautions will appear on a DBS certificate until 6 years have passed (or 2 years if the person was under 18 at the time of caution) provided the offence is not on the prescribed list of offences that will never be filtered from a criminal record check.

All information relating to simple cautions (as well as convictions) issued for a recordable offence is retained on the Police National Computer (PNC). Association of Chief Police Officers (ACPO) guidelines set out how long this information will be retained for. The information is kept for police operational reasons and in the interest of prevention and detection of crime.

== History ==
It is likely the practice of using police cautions began early in the nineteenth century. In the 1920s written warnings started being given for motoring offences. In 1928 the Home Office published statistics on cautions, and by 1931 was giving advice on the wording of cautions.

In 1959 the Street Offences Act made a provision for removing cautions from criminal records. In 1962 Royal Commission on the Police noted concerns about the uneven enforcement of cautions. In 1978 the Home Office issued its first circular to bring about consistency in the use of cautions for juveniles, and in 1985 for adults.

From 1995 cautions were recorded on the Police National Computer, and it was recommended that cautions should be retained for 5 years, though each police force could follow its own guidelines. The 1997 Police Act made provision for disclosing cautions to employers of those who might have unsupervised contact with children.

The Criminal Justice Act 2003 introduced the concept of statutory Conditional Cautions.

By the early 2000s police forces were given targets for the number of offences brought to justice. As giving a caution was a way of bringing an offence to justice more easily than going to court, in some policing areas the number of cautions given increased to about 30% of all offences brought to justice.

In 2006 new guidelines were issued for the retention of records until the subject reached 100 years of age, but after 5 or 10 years, depending on the severity of the offence, they would be used only for DBS checks.

In 2008 a Home Office circular made clear suspects must receive a written explanation of the implications before accepting a caution, to meet the informed consent obligation, and provided a new form to be signed by the offender which explained in considerable detail the consequences.

== Community Resolutions ==
From about 2008, a less stringent resolution of low-level offences has often been used by police forces in England and Wales instead of a caution. This is usually called a 'Community Resolution' (CR) and requires less police time as offenders are not arrested or prosecuted as such. A community resolution does not require any formal record, but the offender should admit the offence and the victim should be happy with this method of informal resolution.

A CR has specific criteria that must be fulfilled before it can be utilized as a disposal method for an offence. Guidance by National Police Chiefs' Council (NPCC) (at the time ACPO) lays out such criteria e.g. the victim agreeing to the CR being used, the offender accepting responsibility for it, only used on low level offences, not already on bail, etc.

A CR is not a formal conviction as such, but may be disclosed on an enhanced CRB check by the Disclosure & Barring Service in the future.

Concerns have been expressed over the use of community resolution for violent offences, in particular domestic violence. Cheshire Constabulary, Durham Police and Nottinghamshire Police were criticised for using community resolutions to deal with offences of the rape of girls under 13 and Merseyside Police were similarly criticised for giving a community resolution to an offender for the rape of a girl under 16.

== Restorative Justice ==
Restorative Justice (RJ) is an addition to a Community Resolution that allows the offender to take steps to make right the offence in question, often with a controlled meeting with the offender and victim and a discussion taking place regarding the crime.

== See also ==
- Right to silence in England and Wales
- Anti-Social Behaviour, Crime and Policing Act 2014
- Prostitutes' caution
