= Soho walk-up =

Flat used by female sex workers in London

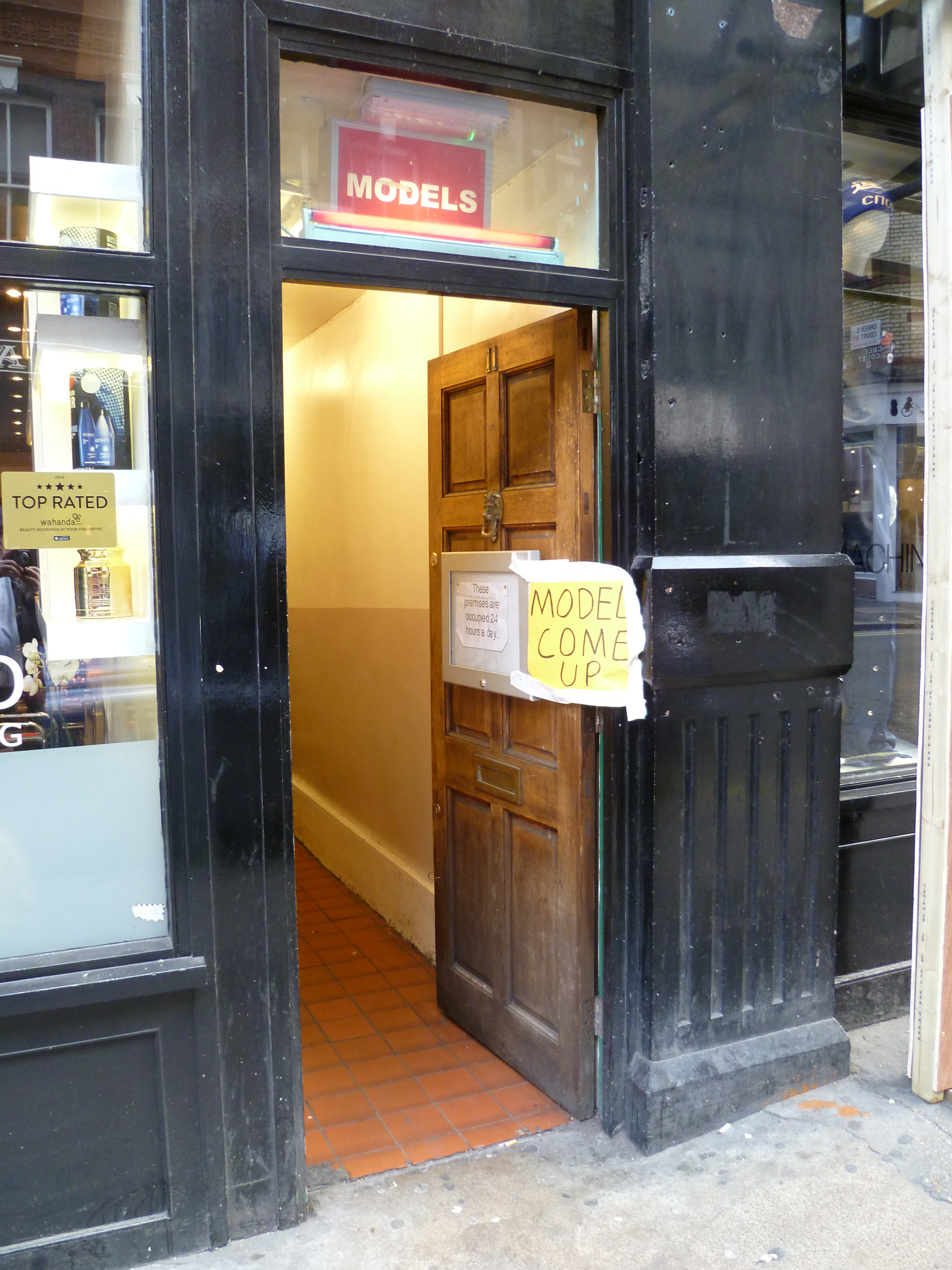
A doorway advertising "Models" in Brewer Street, Soho, London. An example of a Soho walk-up.

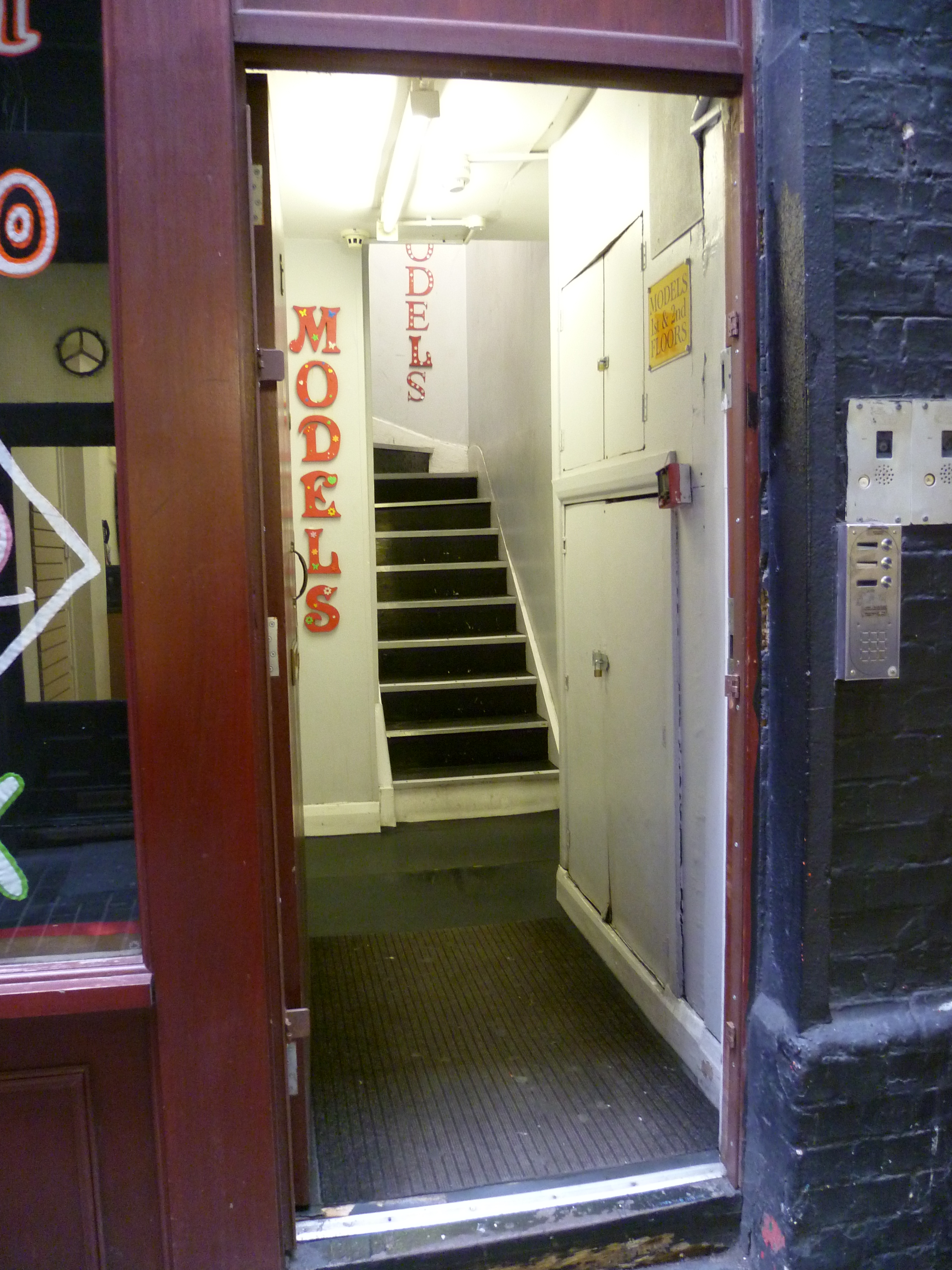
A walk-up in Green's Court, Soho.

A Soho walk-up is a flat in Soho, London, United Kingdom, that is used by a female sex worker for the purposes of prostitution. The flats are located on the upper floors of buildings in Soho's red light district, often above shops, and accessed by a staircase from a door on the street. They form a distinctive way of working that is characteristic of the sex industry in Soho, originating in the 1960s and declining during the 21st century.

== History ==
The Soho area has been at the heart of London's sex industry since 1778 when the first brothel was opened. Before the Street Offences Act 1959 became law, street prostitutes worked in Piccadilly Circus and the streets and alleys around Soho. By the early 1960s almost every doorway in Soho had red-lit doorbells, or open doors with little postcards just inside advertising "Large Chest for Sale" or "French Lessons Given". The lack of action against these establishments was probably due to the widespread corruption in London's Metropolitan Police. During the mid–2000s several walk-ups on streets leading off Shaftesbury Avenue were bought up and closed or renovated for other uses. By the end of 2014 the gentrification of Soho had reduced the number of flats used for prostitution to around 40, it has since reduced to about a dozen walk-ups. Nevertheless, the area remains a red-light district and prostitution still takes place in walk-ups. The studio flats in which they work are often sign-posted by fluorescent "model" signs at street level.

== Description ==
A "walk-up" is a type of flat that is accessed from a common stairway rather than a lift. The way a potential client accesses a Soho walk-up is generally by walking through an open door at street level and then up a flight of stairs to a second closed door which has a door bell containing a girl's name. The client rings the bell to gain access. From the street level door to the main building there is often a visible hand crafted sign reading "model" to indicate that it is indeed the entrance to one or more walk-ups.

Most buildings used for walk-ups have two or three separate walk-ups in them. The walk-ups generally have a rota system with a different sex worker working every day. Each walk-up normally contains a single sex worker and a maid. The job of the maid is to act as receptionist who can receive potential clients when the sex worker is occupied and either give them somewhere to wait or suggest they return at a later time.

There are a number of online directories that give the locations of the walk-ups and some details of the sex workers that are providing services on particular days.

Unlike a call girl or escort, visits are not by appointment and no booking is made. The potential client simply rings the bell to see if the sex worker is available.

Money is paid directly to the sex worker for the required sexual service. A tip of a few pounds is normally also offered for the maid.

== Legality ==
The legality of a Soho walk-up can be difficult to determine as the law of England and Wales on prostitution is complex. For a house to be a de jure brothel it must be used by more than one person to offer sexual services. A Soho walk-up does not resemble a conventional brothel as only one sex worker works in each walk-up at any one time. However, a walk-up may qualify in law as a brothel or part of one if there is more than one walk-up in a building or if the flat is used sequentially by more than one prostitute.

Another complexity is the question of whether soliciting for prostitution takes place in a Soho walk-up. The euphemistic sign at the door is the only communication to the public that sexual services are available there, and clients must by their own initiative walk in through the door. This makes the practice significantly different from street prostitution, which contravenes the Street Offences Act 1959. Nevertheless, the Sexual Offences Act 2003 makes it illegal for a prostitute to solicit potential customers on the street or in any other public place, and the definition of "public place" used in the Criminal Justice Act 1972 includes premises accessible to the public, making it possible that the law prohibiting soliciting does apply to a Soho walk-up.

In practice, for much of the second half of the 20th century the police did not attempt to close the Soho walk-ups. This laissez faire policy in turn made it difficult to enforce the law. A police investigation in 2007 which led to charges of controlling prostitution resulted in a successful defence of "abuse of process". Consequently, prosecuting for sexual offences is often not the approach chosen by police. Instead closure orders on the grounds of drug taking and public nuisance and/or disorder are typically used. Nevertheless, there have been a number of high-profile police raids in Soho based on allegations of sex trafficking and pimping, and these have resulted in the closure of some walk-ups. However, in some cases the closure orders have been overturned in court as it could not be adequately demonstrated that prostitutes were being "controlled". In these cases the courts allowed the walk-ups to reopen.

== In fiction ==
- A Soho walk-up appears in Monica Ali's 2009 novel In the Kitchen as one of the places where young immigrant woman Lena is forced to work as a prostitute.
- Barry Manilow mentions "walk-ups" in his song "London" on his 1980 album Barry.

== See also ==
- Prostitution in the United Kingdom
- Cross Bones
