= The Erotic Review =

Escort review website

- Website type: Sexual services' review
- Available in: English
- Owners: Treehouse Park, S.A.
- Founder: David Elms
- Website: Official website
- Launched: October 24, 1999; 27 years ago
- Current status: Active

The Erotic Review, also functioning as TheEroticReview.com, is a review site that ostensibly presents clients' assessments of their experiences with sex workers (referred to as "providers" on the website).

== History ==
The service was first launched in 1999 by David Elms, who came up with the idea after having what he described as a "bad encounter" with a call girl.

The Erotic Review website was acquired by Treehouse Park in 2004.

On April 6, 2018, the U.S. Congress passed the Allow States and Victims to Fight Online Sex Trafficking Act; following this and the FBI shutting down Backpage and other websites promoting or facilitating in prostitution, The Erotic Review blocked access to its site from the United States until December 2019, though it could still be accessed in the United States via a VPN.

On July 25, 2018, The Erotic Review was mentioned in a superseding indictment filed by the government against Backpage.com. The superseding indictment alleges that Backpage and The Erotic Review had a reciprocal link agreement, where both parties allowed ads to be posted on their sites. The indictment alleges that Backpage paid “tens of thousands” of dollars to The Erotic Review for this agreement.

On December 19, 2019, The Erotic Review again opened access to the United States without needing VPN, restoring previously hidden USA escort reviews and allowing new USA escort reviews to be posted.

== Content and readership ==
A 2008 River Front Times article features Elms commenting that the average site-user was "between 35 and 55 years old with a median income of $80,000".

The Erotic Review hosts reviews for over 90 cities around the world. The site offers both a free and paid membership. Free members can access site features such as the discussion boards and a limited search function. Paid members have additional features such as the ability to access complete reviews and a search page that allows the user to search based on various criteria such as physical attributes.

== Criticism ==
The site has been met with criticism, most of which centered upon its founder. Some critics have claimed that Elms has accepted bribes to promote certain agencies or call girls and has pressured others into providing sexual favors. Others have made claims of Elms threatening them with bodily harm for criticizing the site or refusing to provide sexual services. Elms denied the claims. Others have expressed "frustration" over the company's association with law enforcement, stating that the site should be warning escorts and/or users if someone is a police officer.

The Erotic Review distanced itself from Elms in 2009 and cut ties with him after Elms was arrested in Phoenix, Arizona, for hiring a hit man to assault a business rival, and was sentenced to four and a half years in prison that same year.

== See also ==
- Punternet
