= PunterNet =

Escort review website

- Website type: Escort Website
- Available in: English
- Website: www.punternet.com
- Launched: 1999; 27 years ago (as Field Reports)
- Current status: Closed

PunterNet was a review site that allowed customers to rate their experiences with call girls. Customers were referred to as "punters" on the website.

The website was initially an information source run by enthusiasts and service users rather than a commercial enterprise. It described itself as "The Online Community for Patrons and Providers of Adult Personal Services in the UK". The London Evening Standard newspaper called it "the most successful of the prostitute-reviewing internet sites". The reviews, originally called "field reports", were written almost exclusively by men and described heterosexual encounters with female sex workers.

The site was sold in August 2017 and the new owners dropped the discussion boards from the site. They also changed the site's policy to allow male and transgender service providers to advertise and be reviewed. Previously this had been limited to female escorts only. The site shut down in June 2026.

== Features ==
The site offered free membership. Free members could submit reviews and access site features and a limited search function.

== Criticism ==
The site was met with criticism, most notably in 2009 from Harriet Harman. Harman, who was the UK government's Minister for Women and Equality at the time, asked then-California governor Arnold Schwarzenegger to ban the website, given that it was based in California, US. The web owners thanked Harman for increasing web traffic to their site.

In 2013, Trishna Datta, a former outreach worker from Ilford, Essex, launched a petition to have the PunterNet website taken down. She said the website lacked adequate safety measures to ensure details that could put sex workers in danger were not revealed. Additionally, she expressed concern that some of the sex workers reviewed on the site might be underage or victims of trafficking or sexual assault. PunterNet commented that it would report underage prostitutes to the authorities, and that it encourages customers to report underage prostitutes and victims of trafficking to Crimestoppers UK.

== Academic reference ==
Data from PunterNet was used by Peter Moffatt and Simon Peters, both lecturers in econometrics, in their 2004 work "Pricing personal services: An empirical study of earnings in the UK prostitution industry".

== See also ==
- George McCoy
- Harris's List of Covent Garden Ladies
- Internet prostitution
