= Classified magazine =

Magazine that publishes small ads and announcements

A classified magazine is a magazine that publishes small ads and announcements, known as classifieds, often for free or at relatively low cost. Typically, these include items for sale and wanted, services offered, and sometimes personal ads. Some classified magazines specialize in particular areas, such as the sale of cars. They are typically published monthly or weekly.

Advertisements are sometimes accompanied by small pictures of items for sale, or in the case of personal advertisements, pictures of the advertisers. However, most content is textual. A small amount of display advertising and/or journalism may also be included.

Such magazines may be national or local. Distribution is typically via kiosks, newsstands, or dump bins, and less often via free home delivery or paid subscription through the mail. Many publishers also publish their advertisements on the World Wide Web.

The business models of their publishers vary. Some distribute the magazine for free while charging advertisers. In some cases, advertisements are free, but readers pay for copies. Others offer free advertisements only for goods under a certain value, charging for others. Some publishers charge both the advertiser and the reader. The choice of business model largely depends on the perceived value of the advertisements to readers and the perceived value to advertisers of receiving responses.

In the case of personal advertisements, the publisher may generate additional income by providing a voicemail service. This allows individuals responding to an advertisement to call a premium rate telephone number and leave a message for the advertiser without revealing the advertiser's identity.

Although referred to as magazines, many classified magazines are printed on newsprint.

== Contact magazines ==
A contact magazine is a type of classified magazine containing personal advertisements placed by those seeking or offering sexual encounters. These magazines are largely or wholly dedicated to classified advertising. With the advent of social networks and other contact websites, contact magazines have largely become an anachronism.

Contact magazines initially became popular in the 1960s during the sexual revolution. They contained sex-contact advertisements for prostitutes, swingers and others seeking casual sex. In the UK the first example to appear was The Ladies' Directory in 1960. It was successfully prosecuted for "conspiracy to corrupt public morals", but subsequent publications that appeared from 1965 onwards were not prosecuted and became a method commonly used by prostitutes for the advertisement of their services. In some countries, contact magazines were also used to advertise home-made amateur pornography.

The advertisements were often arranged by geographical area, and the advertisers were usually identified only by a code number. Sometimes a photograph of the advertiser was included, often hiding the face. The sources of income for the magazine included not only the cover price and the fees for placing advertisements, but also charges paid by those responding to them for using the magazine's mail forwarding service to have their letters sent on to the advertisers. The magazines were often sold in adult bookstores. In some locations, such as the Las Vegas Strip, contact magazines advertising the services of female escorts were handed out by street hawkers.

Specialized contact magazines also existed for those with specific sexual preferences, such as individuals seeking BDSM encounters. Advertisements in these were mainly placed by professional dominatrices and male submissives in need of their services. BDSM contact magazines remained popular until the 1990s, but at the beginning of the 21st century they disappeared as professional dominants switched to internet advertising.
