= Common prostitute =

English legal term for a female prostitute

"Common prostitute" is a term used in English law related to prostitution. The term was first used in the Vagrancy Act 1824. The term continued to be used in the Street Offences Act 1959 which maintained the illegality of street prostitution. Section 1 stated: "It shall be an offence for a common prostitute to loiter or solicit in a street or public place for the purpose of prostitution."

The case of Director of Public Prosecutions v Bull [1994] 158 J.P. 1005 determined that the term could only be applied to female, and not male, prostitutes.

The term was widely regarded as archaic, stigmatising, and offensive, and a number of failed attempts had been made since the 1920s to enact new legislation which would replace the wording with a solicitation law that applied to both sexes equally, and did not create an offence that could only be committed by a special class of person.

In 2007 the government announced that it would introduce new legislation which would eliminate the use of the term, and replace it with new language which would apply equally to males and females. Section 16 of the Policing and Crime Act 2009 amended s.1(1) of the Street Offences Act 1959 to replace the term "common prostitute" with "person".

The Policing and Crime Act 2009 also introduced tough new measures aimed at men seeking women for the purpose of prostitution. In particular the act makes it an offence for someone to pay or promise to pay a prostitute who has been subject to "exploitative conduct". The change made the customer an equal offender with the street prostitute.

== See also ==
- Prostitution in the United Kingdom
- Prostitute's caution
- Street prostitute
