= Escort agency =

Company that provides escorts, usually for sexual services

An escort agency is a company that provides escorts for clients, usually for sexual services. The agency typically arranges a meeting between one of its escorts and the client at the customer's house or hotel room (outcall), or at the escort's residence (incall). Some agencies also provide escorts for longer durations, who may stay with the client or travel along on a holiday or business trip. While the escort agency is paid a fee for this booking and dispatch service, the customer must negotiate any additional fees or arrangements directly with the escort for any other services that are not provided by the agency involved, such as providing sexual services (regardless of the legality of these services).

== Business model ==
Escort agencies claim that they are dispatching these individuals to provide a social or conversational service rather than a sexual service, since prostitution laws often forbid taking payment for sex or communicating for the purpose of arranging a contract for sexual services. Advertisements for escort agencies often carefully skirt the legal line, and avoid specifically offering prostitution or sexual services. This fact in turn is well known to police and the political powers, who, where prostitution is illegal, usually prefer to act against more visible and problematic street prostitution. This has been criticized as hypocrisy, especially where governments license and tax the escort agencies. However, there almost certainly do exist agencies that do go by these laws and do not facilitate prostitution. Some countries have used a two-pronged approach of criminalizing street prostitution but permitting or licensing prostitution in brothels or via escort agencies.

=== Recruiting ===
Escort agencies often recruit individuals to work as escorts by placing employment advertisements in a magazine or newspaper. Escort agencies typically maintain a list of escorts of different ages and appearances to cater to the varying interests of clients. Some agencies may specifically deal in a certain type of escort. There are male-for-male, female-for-male, and female-for-female escort agencies, as well as a few male-for-female agencies. Agencies commonly specialize in only one sex. Transsexual or transgender escorts are available from some escort agencies.

It is very common for escorts to enter the business through referrals from friends who have been in the business. The effectiveness of ads in weeklies or specialized sites has been questioned by some operators as there are so many that they are diluted. Typically, an escort will interview with an agency.

=== Advertising ===
Once an escort is hired by an agency, they will provide photographs or pose for a photographer. These pictures are posted on the agency's website or circulated among clients to promote business.

Some larger escort agencies maintain websites with photo galleries of their escorts. Clients contact agencies by telephone and offer a description of what kind of escorts are sought. The agency will then suggest an escort who might fit that client's need.

The agency collects the client's contact information and calls the escort. Usually, to protect the identity of the escort and ensure effective communication with the client, the agency arranges the appointment. Sometimes, it may be up to the escort to contact the client directly to make arrangements for the location and time of an appointment. Generally, the escort is also expected to call the agency upon arrival at the location and upon leaving, to ensure the safety of the escort.

== Legal considerations ==
The arm's-length relationship between the escort and the escort agency is designed to protect the escort agency (to some degree) from prosecution for breaking laws against prostitution. If the employee is solely responsible for arranging any illegal prostitution-oriented activities, the agency can maintain plausible deniability should an arrest be made.

Escort services aim to provide an experience that allows the operators to claim that whatever happens between the escort and the client is consensual. Operators tend to avoid discussing specifics over the telephone or via emails to avoid complications with the law.

=== India ===
Prostitution in India is legal, but a number of related activities, including owning or managing a brothel, pimping and pandering, are crimes.

=== Mexico ===
In 2010, Mexico legislators added a law similar to that of the UK called the Anti Trafficking in Persons Act (rough translation) which makes it a crime to offer the sexual services of another person against their will. The law is still broadly interpreted and has many websites which offer the services of escorts running for cover, and newspapers like El Universal stopped taking classified ads for escorts or "executive massages" because of the law, which also goes after anyone promoting the trafficking of persons. The legislator who is spearheading the campaign there has filed a lawsuit against the newspaper Reforma because they have not stopped taking classified ads for these services but have instead put in place a mandatory presentation of official identification of the person placing the ad and the signing of a waiver stating that they are placing the ad on their own behalf and releasing the newspaper from anything that may come from the services offered.

The legislature in Mexico has modified the law to close some loopholes or grey areas and is, like the United States, zooming in on the "end user" or client. The new law encompasses penalties of 7–9 years in prison for contracting an escort, 7–9 years in prison for transporting an escort to her appointment, and now the broadest addition like in the United States, "facilitation" of any person, persons or company that promotes or services of an escort whether a newspaper, internet ad or website is subject to 9–11 years in prison, which grows to a maximum of 23 years if the offending person is a public servant of any kind.

=== United Kingdom ===
Escort prostitution is one of the forms that the sex trade takes in the United Kingdom, along with prostitution practiced in massage parlors, saunas, private flats (such as the Soho walk-ups) and street prostitution. Working as an outcall escort is not an offence, and neither is working as a prostitute in private. However, under the Policing and Crime Act 2009 it is a criminal offence to pay for services of a prostitute who is controlled for gain if any third party uses force, threat (whether or not relating to violence) or any other form of coercion. In 2015 the HMRC set up a dedicated "adult entertainment task force" to collect unpaid income tax from, among others, online escort agencies.

== Financial considerations ==
The amount of money that is made by an escort varies with many factors, such as sexual attractiveness, competition from legal and illegal sources, and the commissions to be paid to the agency. Typically, an agency will charge their escorts either a flat fee for each client connection or a percentage of the pre-arranged rate. According to police in Calgary, Alberta, Canada, the high fees charged by escort agencies may make escorting less lucrative than street prostitution, especially as agencies often also deduct the license fees directly from the earnings.

Independent escorts may have differing fees depending on the season or whether the client is a regular or semi-regular customer. Independent escorts may tend to see clients for extended meetings involving dinner or social activities whereas agency escorts tend to be split into two categories: Cheaper services, especially if mainly based on incall appointments (client visiting the escort at her accommodation), often only provide sexual services, while agencies that provide mainly outcall appointments (the escort visiting the client at either their home or hotel) tend to offer services similar to that of independent escorts.

In New York City, escort services charge anywhere from $200 to $1,500 or more per hour. The industry standard for dividing the money is 50% to the escort, 40% to the agency, and 10% to the booker (a kind of sales representative). Given the level of business can vary week to week, it is not uncommon for escorts to be featured by more than one agency provided they are operated by the same ownership group.

== Statistics ==
A 2005 government survey in New Zealand (where prostitution was regulated and for the most part legalized in 2003) estimated that of the 6,000 prostitutes surveyed, around 20% worked for escort agencies.

== See also ==
- Call girl
- Girlfriend experience
- Girlfriend: can be asked as companions to events
- Geisha: can be called upon for occasions in other districts
- Prostitution by region
- Prostitution law
- Rental family service: allows hiring boy/girlfriends for events (platonic relationship)
- Sugar baby
