= George McCoy =

British writer

- Born: 1948 (age 77–78); Malvern, Worcestershire, England
- Occupation: Writer
- Writing career
- Genre: Guidebooks
- Subject: Sex industry
- Notable work: McCoy's British Massage Parlour Guide
- Website: mccoysguide.com

George McCoy is a British writer best known for producing McCoy's British Massage Parlour Guide, a series of guidebooks to establishments and women in Britain that provide sexual services. The books do not include businesses that provide therapeutic massage services. The term massage parlour is used in the title of the books because the term massage is commonly used in Britain to euphemistically advertise sex work, soliciting prostitution being illegal in the country. McCoy has also written several other guides to sexual services in Britain and appeared in the media to discuss the country's sex industry.

== Early life ==
Born in Malvern, Worcestershire in 1948, McCoy attended Sevenoaks School, Christ's College, Cambridge & Royal Holloway College, University of London, before he took up a career as an entrepreneur. He set up a mail order business selling records which by 1990 had an annual turnover of over £1.9 million. The business declined during the early 1990s.

== Guides ==
McCoy began writing his Massage Parlour Guides in 1996. Since then he has been compiling and regularly updating them by means of visits to around 500 UK establishments. In 2015 McCoy stated that he had sold around 100,000 books online.

In the summer of 2007 McCoy brought out the 11th edition of the Massage Parlour Guide and his first national dominatrix guide, McCoy's Guide to Corrective Services. In most of McCoy's books the entries are split up by county and then subdivided by town, while in the London Guide the entries are split into areas of London and then postal areas. Each entry lists basic details of establishments or women, such as name, phone number, web address, location, basic prices, availability, and then concludes with a paragraph comprising a resume of interesting features about the establishment or woman. Most entries in the guides are star rated and there are photographs of many of the women. McCoy has also produced city street plans to London, Birmingham and Manchester showing the locations of all the relevant cities' adult establishments: massage parlours, gay saunas, adult cinemas, sex shops, swinging clubs and striptease establishments with cartoons indicating their quality and details of each on the reverse side of the map.

By the early 2010s McCoy was editing eleven different guidebooks, four national guidebooks including McCoy's British Massage Parlour Guide and McCoy's Guide to Corrective Services, and seven comprehensive regional guidebooks including in 2012 McCoy's Guide to the Agencies, Corrective Services and Parlours of London No.1 and McCoy's Guide to the Working Ladies of London No.1.

== Media appearances ==
George McCoy has appeared on many television shows in the UK to discuss sexual services. In 1998 he appeared in the documentary Vice - The Sex Trade on ITV. In 2001 he appeared in Massage Parlours - The Real McCoy on Channel Five. In 2006 he appeared in Streets of Vice on BBC One. He has also appeared on television in three episodes of The Big Questions: in Leeds on 20 January 2008, in Bristol 24 May 2009 and in Bury 1 April 2012. Other appearances include the Welsh Panorama television programme Week In - Week Out which focused on adult services in Cardiff, as well as More4 News, 5 News, ITV News and Midlands Today, commenting on the sex industry. He has also appeared on chatshows such as Kilroy and been interviewed on BBC Local Radio shows, such as his appearance on BBC Radio Derby in August 2011. He has been featured in The Economist magazine three times between 1999 and 2013. In 2018 he wrote an article for The Spectator magazine titled "Why do powerful men love to be spanked?" In March 2019 he appeared on the TV programme Sex on the Streets on 5Star.

== See also ==
- Prostitution in the United Kingdom
