= Tart card =

Cards in phone booths advertising call girls

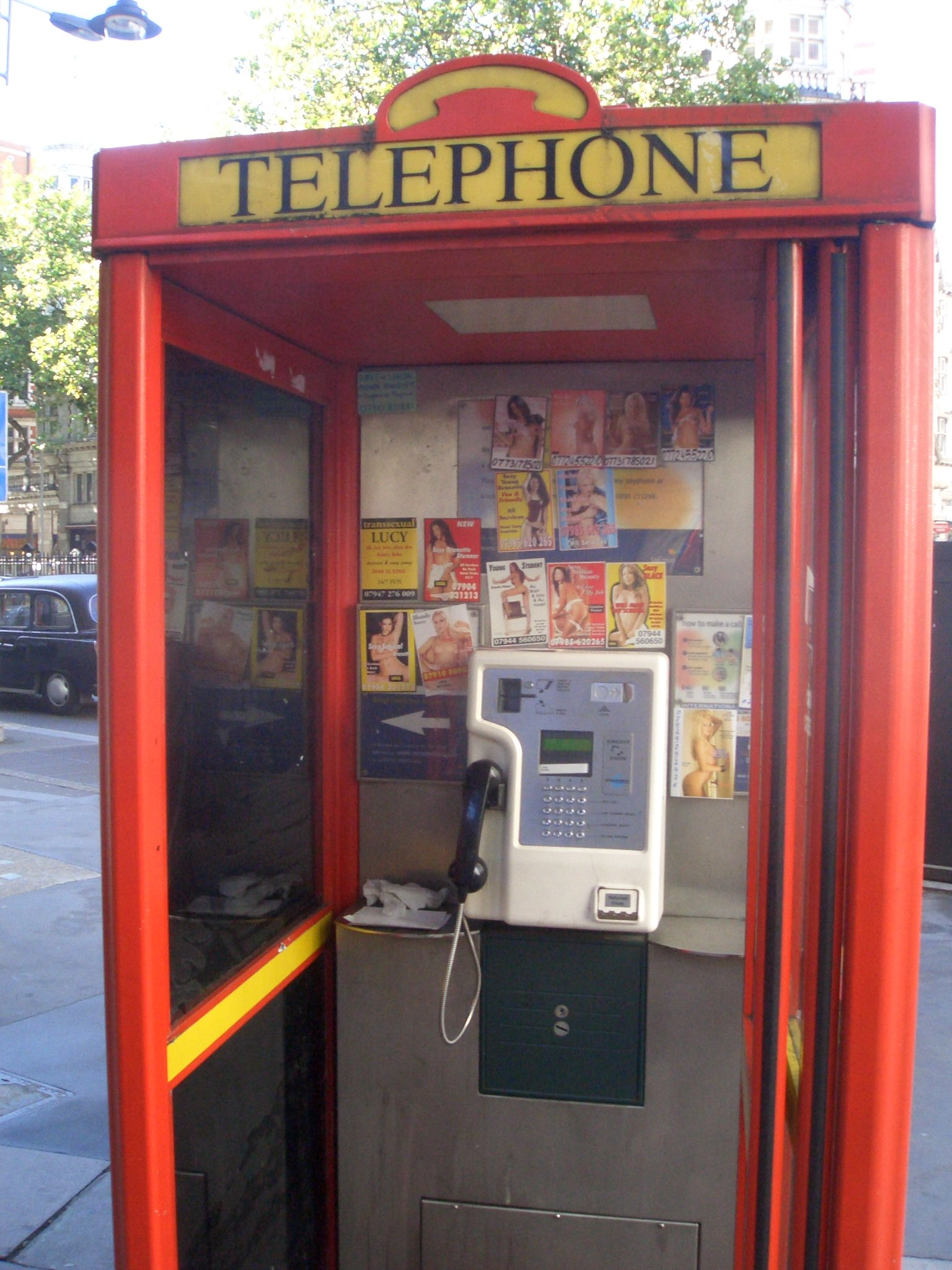
Tart cards in a British phone box advertising the services of call girls in London, 2005

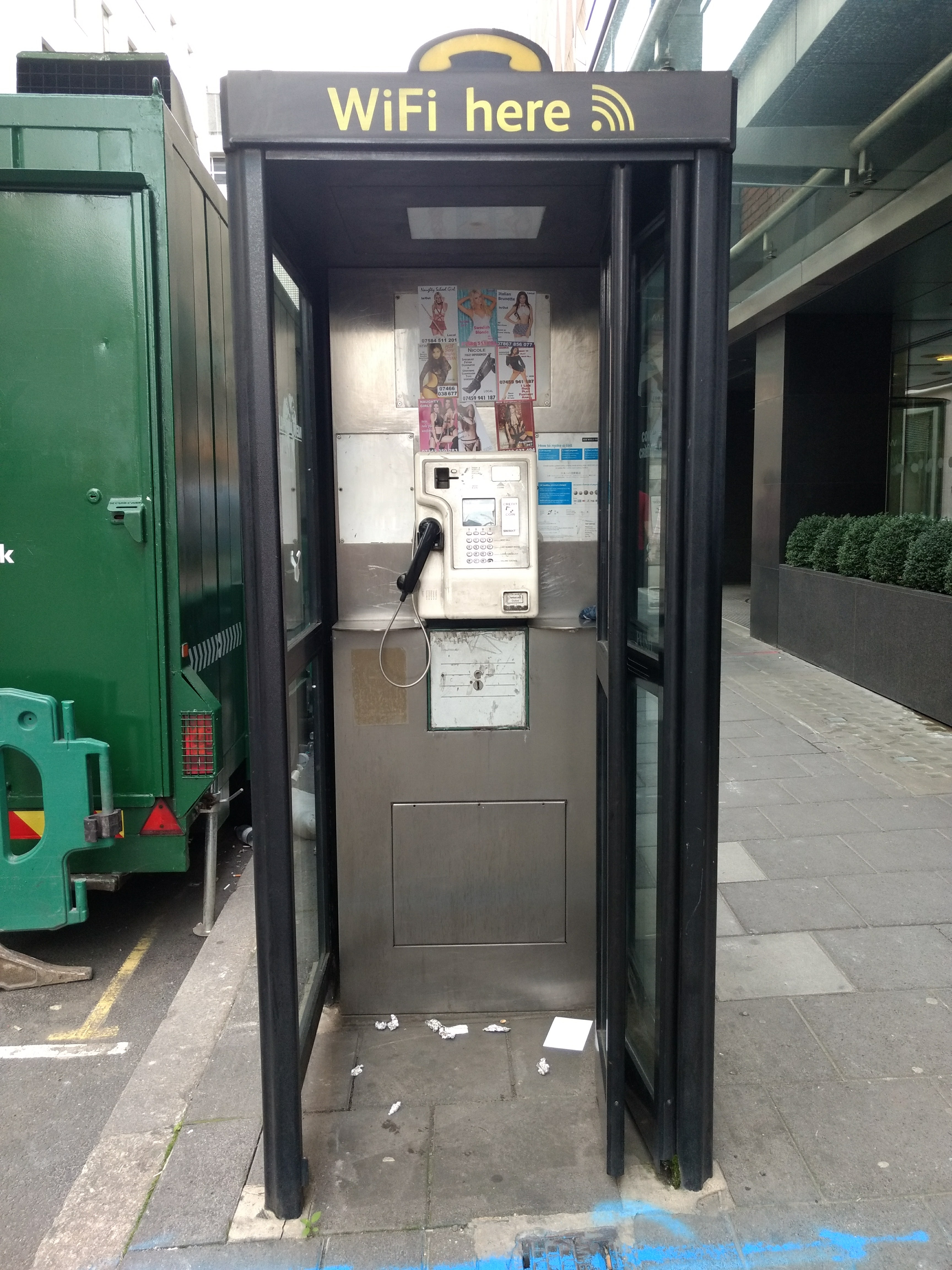
Phone box with tart cards, London, 2017

A tart card is a card which advertises the services of a prostitute. The cards are found in many countries, usually in capital cities or red-light districts. Originating in the 1960s, the cards are placed in locations such as newsagents' windows or telephone boxes. Alternatively they are handed out or dropped in the street. Legal action is sometimes taken against their use. Illustrated tart cards from the 1980s and 1990s have come to be regarded as examples of sub-cultural outsider art.

== United Kingdom ==
In England and Wales the Sexual Offences Act 1956 made soliciting for street prostitution illegal. As a result, indoor sex work became more common and sex workers began to advertise their services and telephone numbers on small, cheaply produced cards in the windows of newsagents. Known as tart cards, they became established in the 1960s in places such as Soho, London, where they were typically handwritten postcards which were displayed outside prostitutes' flats or in the windows of newsagents or shops. As direct references to prostitution would generally be unacceptable, the cards were carefully worded and often contained euphemistic references to sex, with terms such as large chest for sale.

The abolition of the 1953 Post Office Act in 1984 inadvertently legalised the placement of advertisements in telephone boxes, and they became the main location for tart cards, particularly in London. By the late 1980s the cards had become black-and-white photocopied cards containing printed text and telephone numbers. The cards from the 1980s and 1990s often included black-and-white drawings printed on neon-coloured card along with tongue-in-cheek phrases. In larger cities, the cards were placed in phone boxes. The style of illustration changed in the early twenty-first century, when tart cards began to appear with full-colour nude photographs, mobile telephone numbers and websites.

In London tart cards are placed in phone boxes by professional "carders", who tour the phone boxes, replacing cards which have been removed by the telephone companies' cleaners. Carders often remove cards placed by rival carders. Placing tart cards in phone boxes was made illegal by the passing of the Criminal Justice and Police Act 2001 which made carding punishable by up to six months imprisonment or a fine of up to £5000. By 2002 most convicted carders were receiving fines of £200–£1000, although persistent offenders were receiving jail terms of 28 days. An estimated 13 million tart cards per year were being distributed across Britain at that time; the telephone company British Telecom was removing 150,000 tart cards per week from central London telephone boxes and it had call-barred 500 of the telephone numbers used on tart cards. However, despite police operations against carders the practice of carding still continues.

The cards from the 1980s and 1990s have become a memorable part of London counter-culture from that era. Over time they have become regarded as items of "accidental art" and developed a cult following. They have influenced the work of mainstream artists, inspiring collections, research, exhibitions and books such as the 2003 book Tart Cards: London’s Illicit Advertising Art, and 2018 book Tart Art. Subsequently, they have been recognised as a sociological record of trends related to sex work, advertising, design and print. The Wellcome Collection in London contains thousands of examples, just over half of which advertise BDSM services.

== Other countries ==
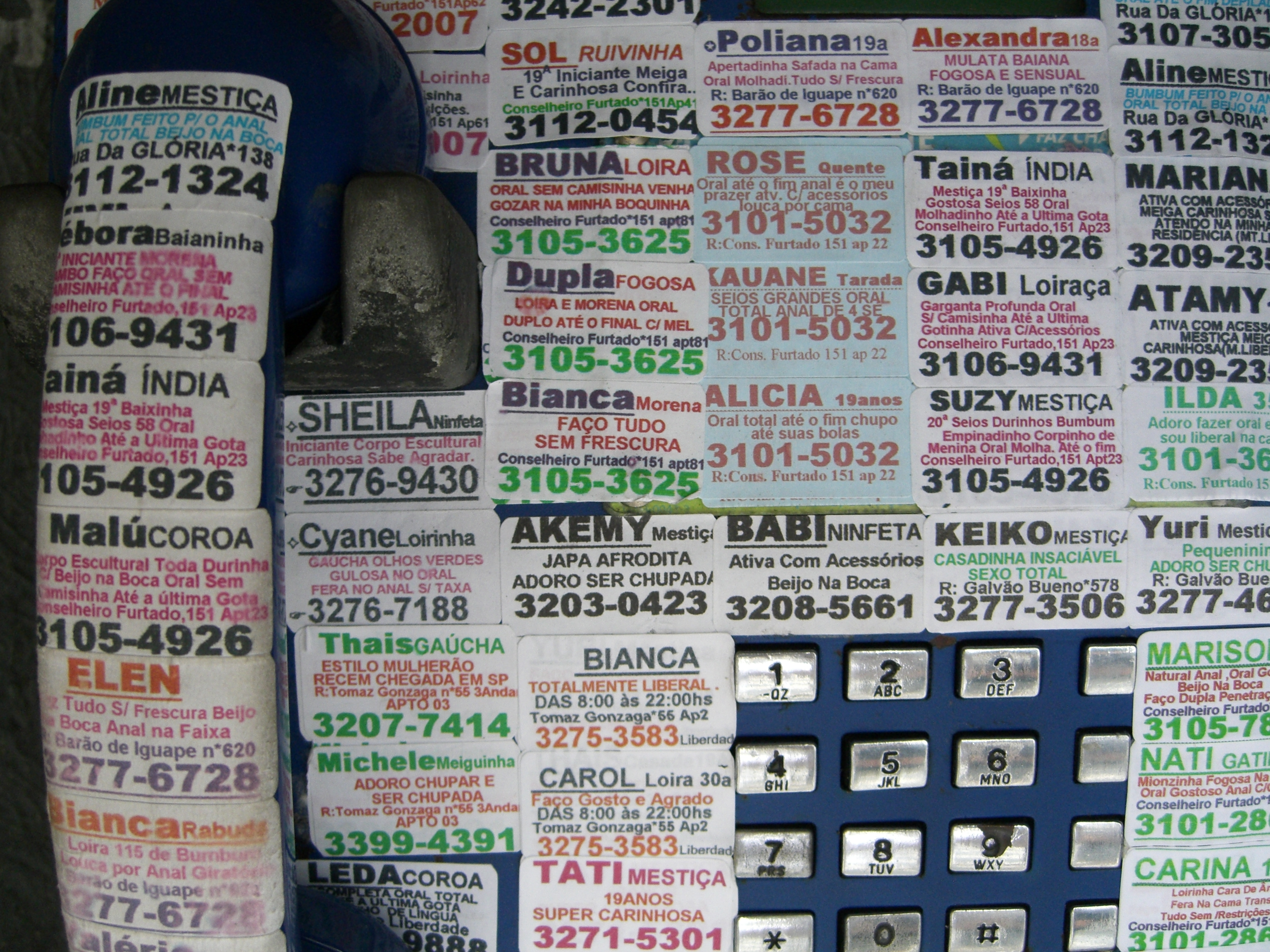
Tart cards in a telephone booth in Brazil, 2006

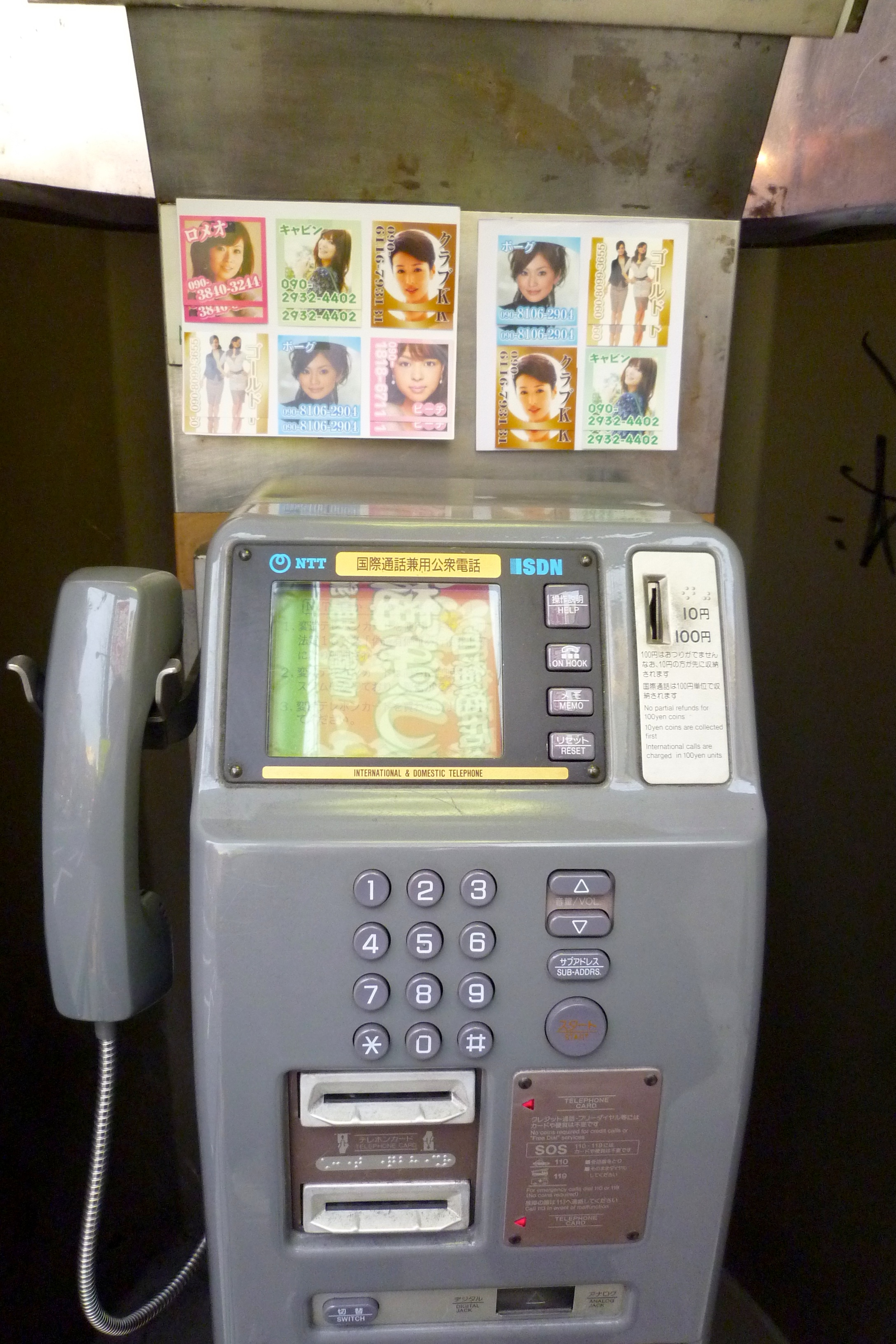
Tart cards in Tokyo, 2005

- Argentina: They are found in Buenos Aires.
- Brazil: They are found in São Paulo.
- China: They are commonly put under the doors of hotels during the day after the cleaning staff have finished in the rooms.
- Japan: In Japan they were known as "pink flyers" (ピンクチラシ).
- Macau: They are dropped in the city's sidewalks and underpasses.
- United Arab Emirates: Cards advertising "massage" services, often printed with images of women, are delivered to people's homes, placed onto car windows, and distributed by hand in the street. This practice is illegal.
- United States: In Hispanophone parts of New York City they are known as "Chica Chica" (Girl Girl) cards and men hand them out as flyers at night on the streets. In Las Vegas they are known as "sex cards" and left on sidewalks and hotel stairways or handed out as flyers.

== See also ==
- Smiling Girl, a Courtesan, Holding an Obscene Image
