= Call girl =

Type of sex worker

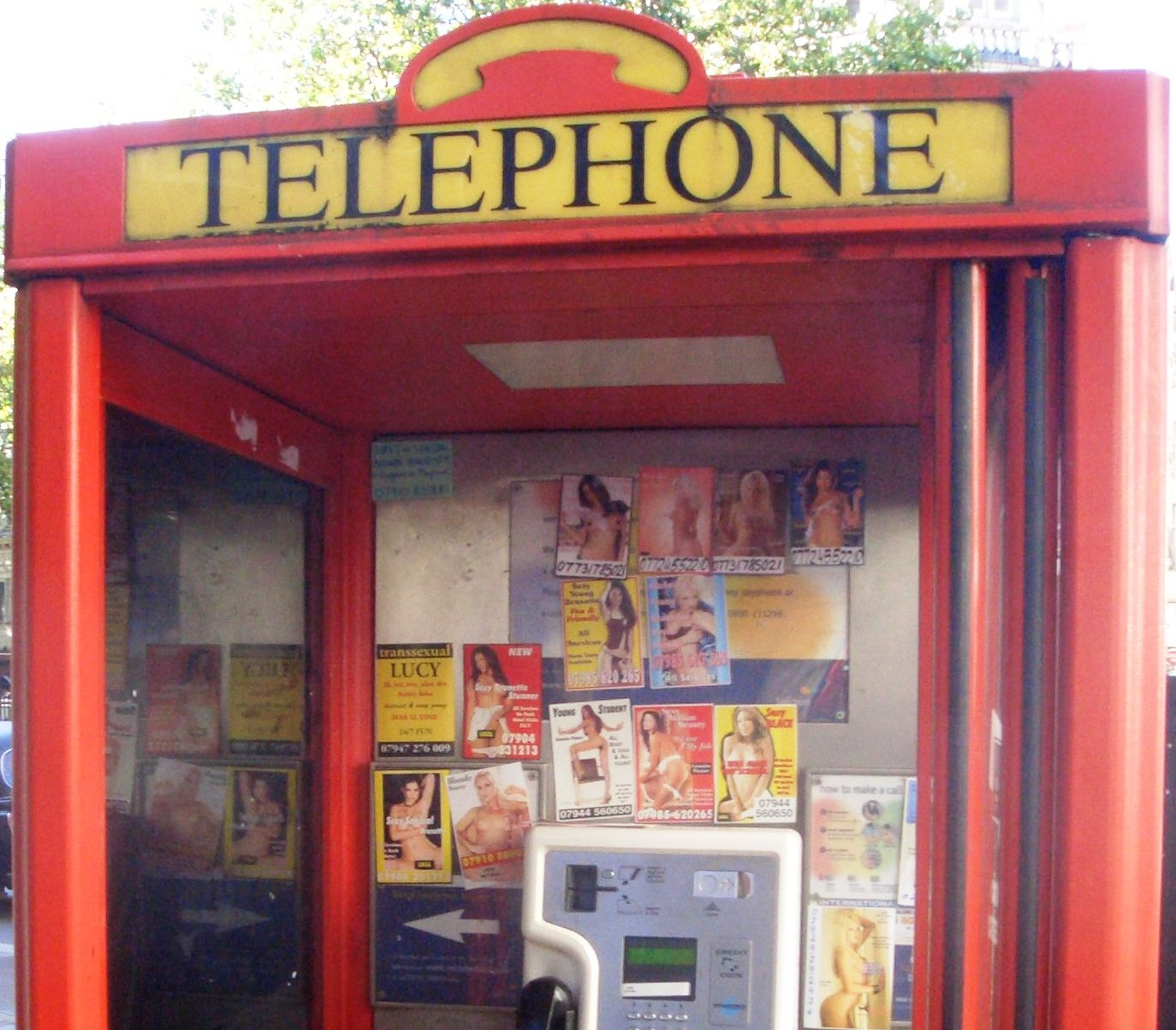
- Tart cards for call girls in a British phone box

Occupation
- Names: Call girl, female escort
- Occupation type: Prostitution
- Activity sectors: Entertainment, sex industry

Description
- Fields of employment: Escort agency
- Related jobs: Courtesan, sex worker

A call girl or female escort is a prostitute who (unlike a street walker) does not display her profession to the general public, nor does she usually work in an institution like a brothel, although she may be employed by an escort agency. The client must make an appointment, usually by calling a telephone number.

The typical age of call girls ranges between late teens and mid-twenties, and on average they have a higher level of education than street prostitutes.

Call girls have traditionally had a number of routes available to advertise their services, including classified advertisements in magazines and latterly via the Internet. The use of online classified advertisement websites such as Backpage for this purpose has increased during the 21st century. An intermediary advertiser, such as an escort agency, may be involved in promoting escorts, though they are not normally handled by pimps. Call girl prices are typically significantly higher than those charged by brothel- and street prostitutes.

Call girls may work either incall, where the client comes to them, or outcall, where they go to the client. Some porn stars are known to escort as well, as a result of the financial decline of the U.S. pornography industry since the mid-2000s.

== Internet ==
Many call girl agencies and independent call girls have their own websites. The internet has become the main medium through which customers find their desired escort. Generally, a picture of the woman is provided, and sometimes, the type of sexual services she offers.

== Notable call girls ==
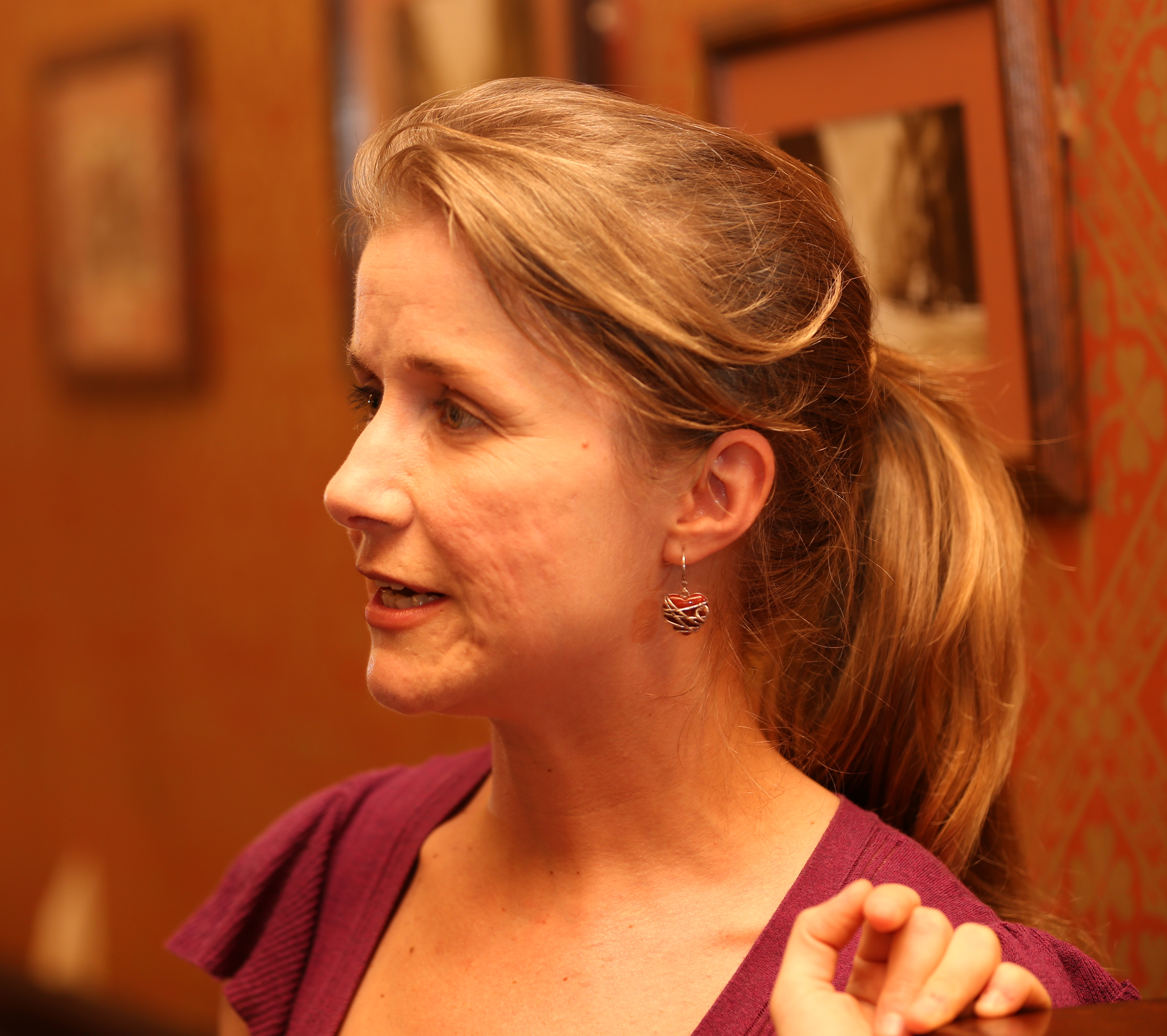
Call girls Brooke Magnanti and Anette Dawn
- Anette Dawn, Hungarian make-up artist, ceramist and professional sex worker
- Ashley Alexandra Dupré, American call girl and entertainer involved in the Eliot Spitzer prostitution scandal
- Suzy Favor Hamilton, former Olympic athlete who was revealed in 2012 to have been moonlighting as a high-end call girl
- Xaviera Hollander, Dutch former call girl, madam and author
- Jillian Lauren, American writer and former call girl for Jefri Bolkiah, Prince of Brunei, about whom she wrote the memoir Some Girls: My Life in a Harem
- Brooke Magnanti, British writer and call girl whose blogs and books were adapted into the television programme Secret Diary of a Call Girl
- Deanne Salinger, American legal prostitute, glamour model, adult model, and reality TV performer

== See also ==
- Courtesan
- Delivery health
- Geisha, a class of female Japanese performance artists often confused with sex workers.
- Girlfriend experience
- Internet prostitution
- Male prostitution ("call boy")
- Punternet
- Sugar baby
- The Erotic Review
