= Street Offences Act 1959 =

Act of the Parliament of the United Kingdom

Street Offences Act 1959 (Note: Section 5(1).)
- Act of Parliament
- Parliament of the United Kingdom
- Long title: An Act to make, as respects England and Wales, further provision against loitering or soliciting in public places for the purpose of prostitution, and for the punishment of those guilty of certain offences in connection with refreshment houses and those who live on the earnings of or control prostitutes.
- Citation: 7 & 8 Eliz. 2. c. 57
- Territorial extent: England and Wales (Note: Section 5(3).)

Dates
- Royal assent: 16 July 1959
- Commencement: 16 August 1959 (Note: Section 5(4).)
Other legislation
Amends	Metropolitan Police Act 1839; City of London Police Act 1839
Amended by	Licensing Act 1961; Statute Law (Repeals) Act 1974; Statute Law (Repeals) Act 1989; Statute Law (Repeals) Act 1993; Sexual Offences Act 2003; Serious Organised Crime and Police Act 2005; Policing and Crime Act 2009; Serious Crime Act 2015

Status: Amended

Text of statute as originally enacted

Revised text of statute as amended

Text of the Street Offences Act 1959 as in force today (including any amendments) within the United Kingdom, from legislation.gov.uk.

The Street Offences Act 1959 (7 & 8 Eliz. 2. c. 57) is an act of the Parliament of the United Kingdom concerning street prostitution. It was passed following the publication of the Wolfenden report which discussed the rise in street prostitution at the time.

Until 2009, section 1(1) of the act used the old term "common prostitute" until Section 16 of the Policing and Crime Act 2009 amended it to replace the term "common prostitute" with "person".

== Section 2 - Procedure ==
Section 2 of the act provided that a woman cautioned by a constable in respect of her conduct in a street or public place could apply by way of complaint to an authorised court. The rule was that the woman's complaint was to be heard and determined in camera, unless the woman desired that the proceedings should be conducted in public.

== Section 3 - Punishment of offences in connection with night cafes ==
The provisions in sections 3(2) to (5) had effect in relation to the punishment of offences to which section 26 of the Licensing Act 1949 applied. This section was repealed by part II of schedule 9 to the Licensing Act 1961 (9 & 10 Eliz. 2. c. 61).

== Section 4 - Punishment for living on earnings of prostitution ==
Section 4 established the maximum term of imprisonment for living on earnings of prostitution.

== Section 5 - Short title, repeal, extent and commencement ==
Section 5(2) was repealed by part XI of the schedule to the Statute Law (Repeals) Act 1974.

Section 5(4) provides that the act came into force at the expiration of the period of one month that began on the date on which it was passed. The word "month" means calendar month. The day (that is to say, 16 July 1959) on which the act was passed (that is to say, received royal assent) is included in the period of one month. This means that the act came into force on 16 August 1959.

== See also ==
- Soliciting
