= Master of the Banderoles =

Dutch anonymous engraver

- Occupation: Engraver
- Years active: c. 1450–1475

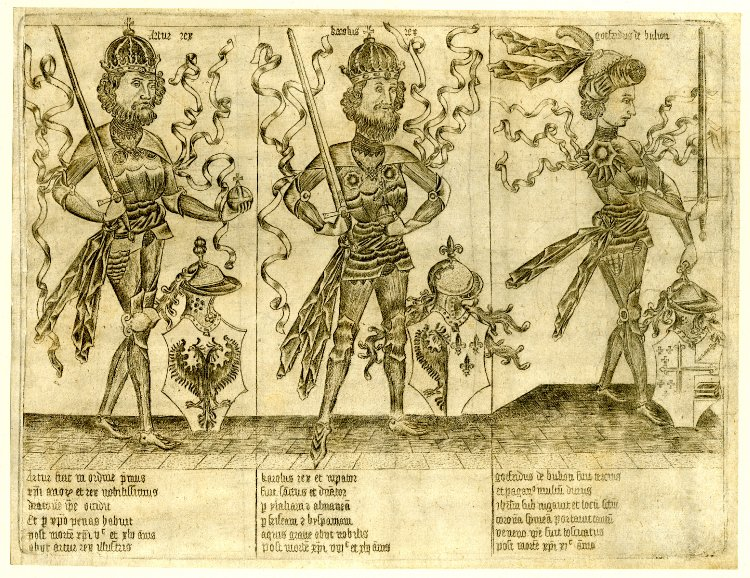
Three Christian Worthies: King Arthur, Charlemagne, Godfrey of Bouillon. Engraving, c. 1450-75. British Museum.

The Master of the Banderoles (active c. 1450–1475) was an anonymous engraver who is thought to have worked in the northern Netherlands, perhaps in Geldern or Overijssel. He is named for his use of "banderoles", or speech scrolls in his prints. His technique has been characterized as "crude" and "clumsy", and most of the 130 engravings attributed to him are copies after other artists such as Master E. S. and Rogier van der Weyden. Arthur Mayger Hind similarly describes the artist as "of small original power, but of some interest as a copyist".
