= William Acton (doctor) =

British medical doctor and writer

William Acton (1813–1875) was a British medical doctor and book writer. He was known for his books on masturbation.

== Biography ==
Acton was a native of Shillingstone and he enrolled as a resident apprentice at St Bartholomew's Hospital.

In 1836, Acton, by then 23 years old, moved to Paris, where he met the well-known American-born doctor Philippe Ricord. He learned about the functions of the generative and urinary organs under Ricord's supervision, and decided to concentrate on gynecology. Acton spent some time in Paris working at the women's venereal hospital.

At the age of twenty-seven, Acton returned to England, already a recognized expert in the gynecological field. In part because of his previous experience in the field, Acton was accepted into the Royal College of Surgeons. At about the same time, Acton began working on his first written work, a book named A Practical Treatise on Diseases of the Urinary and Generative Organs in Both Sexes, where he discussed the relationship between the human brain and children's sexuality.

Acton dedicated himself exclusively to his practice as a gynecologist for the next seventeen years, until he published another book in 1857. The Functions and Disorders of the Reproductive Organs, in Childhood, Youth, Adult Age, and Advanced Life, Considered in the Physiological, Social, and Moral Relations, discussed male reproductive functions exclusively, mentioning women twice but only in the context of their uninterest in sex and their responsibility in cases of male impotence. Acton was a strong proponent of the closed-body system, in which human bodies possessed only a finite amount of energy (sexual and otherwise) which is why masturbation and the expenditure of semen was considered so dangerous. He, like many of his contemporaries, was of the opinion that women were by nature sexually uninterested. Acton claimed that: "The majority of women (happily for them) are not very much troubled with sexual feeling of any kind." He further stated that "As a general rule, a modest woman seldom desires any sexual gratification for herself. She submits to her husband's embraces, but principally to gratify him; and, were it not for the desire of maternity, would far rather be relieved from his attentions." According to Acton, a small percentage of "normal" women felt sexual desire when they menstruated, but he primarily described sexual desire in women as a symptom of nymphomania.

Acton was also well known for his views on moral issues concerning gender and sexuality. An outspoken writer, Acton published his next book, Prostitution, Considered in Its Moral, Social, and Sanitary Aspect, in London and Other Large Cities and Garrison Towns, with Proposals for the Control and Prevention of Attendant Evils, almost immediately after The Functions and Disorders of the Reproductive Organs.... Acton concluded that "Vanity, giddiness, greediness, love of dress, distress, hunger, marke women prostitutes, but not general sensuality."

Acton spent the rest of his life trying to teach upper-class English citizens how to manage the problem of child masturbation. This was referred to as the "masturbation hysteria" with associated beliefs, such as that masturbation could lead to blindness.

Acton died in 1875.
