= Prostitution, Considered in Its Moral, Social, and Sanitary Aspects =

Book by William Acton

Prostitution, Considered in Its Moral, Social, and Sanitary Aspects, in London and Other Large Cities and Garrison Towns, with Proposals for the Mitigation and Prevention of Its Attendant Evils
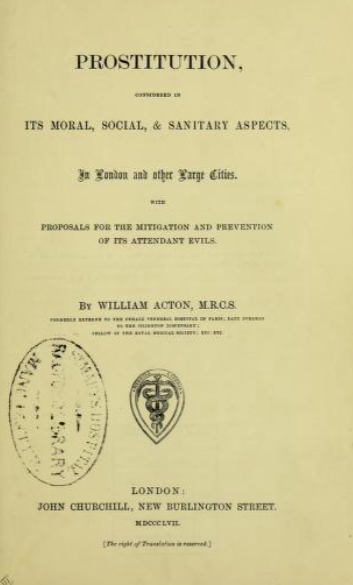
- Title page for Prostitution, Considered in Its Moral, Social, and Sanitary Aspects (1857)
- Author: William Acton
- Publisher: John Churchill & Sons
- Publication date: 1857

Prostitution, Considered in Its Moral, Social, and Sanitary Aspects, in London and Other Large Cities and Garrison Towns, with Proposals for the Mitigation and Prevention of Its Attendant Evils is an 1857 book by William Acton about prostitution in big cities like London and Paris. First published in 1857 by John Churchill & Sons, it was republished and updated in 1870.

== Content ==
In the book Acton professed to desiring to "heal the sick prostitute and to cleanse her moral nature".

The book was republished in 1870 and updated by Acton, in which he drew upon the scandal of the Contagious Diseases Acts of the 1860s to "reinforce his dire warnings about the ubiquitous threat of unregulated and avaricious prostitutes".

== Controversy ==
Controversial, it raised considerable attention for its commentary on society in mid 19th century London and concerns among the wider population that the city was the centre of moral decay in Britain and was infested with diseased prostitutes. One author stated that Acton's book demonstrated a "very swift decline and ultimate total loss of health, modesty and temporal posterity". While Acton meant to expose the profession as a risky one healthwise for both prostitutes and clients alike, and as an immoral practice, many considered that Acton humanized prostitutes by denouncing low wages for women as one of the reasons why they would turn to prostitution. This was in contrast to the dominant perception among members of the middle and upper classes that women decided to become prostitutes because of an innate lustfulness and sinful nature. Acton concluded that "Vanity, giddiness, greediness, love of dress, distress, hunger, marke women prostitutes, but not general sensuality."

== In popular culture ==
In the 1981 film The French Lieutenant's Woman, Meryl Streep's character references commentary from the book, and mentioned that according to Acton's report, The Lancet estimated that in 1857 there were 80,000 prostitutes in the County of London and that one house in 60 functioned as a brothel.
