= Madonna (name) =

Feminine given name

- Pronunciation: English: /məˈdɒnə/ Italian: [maˈdɔnna]
- Gender: Female (given name)

Origin
- Language: Old Italian
- Meaning: "My lady"

Other names
- Alternative spelling: Madona, Madonnah
- Nicknames: Maddy, Maddie, Madge, Donna

Madonna (/məˈdɒnə/) is a feminine given name, originally used as a respectful form of address to an Italian woman in medieval times. It comes from the Old Italian phrase ma donna, which means "my lady". It was later adopted as one of the titles for Mary, mother of Jesus, particularly within Roman Catholic tradition. It has been used in Western Christian art, literature, and other cultural contexts. The name has also become associated with American singer Madonna (full name: Madonna Louise Ciccone). She registered her name as a trademark in the U.S. during the 1980s.

== Etymology and title for Mary, mother of Jesus ==
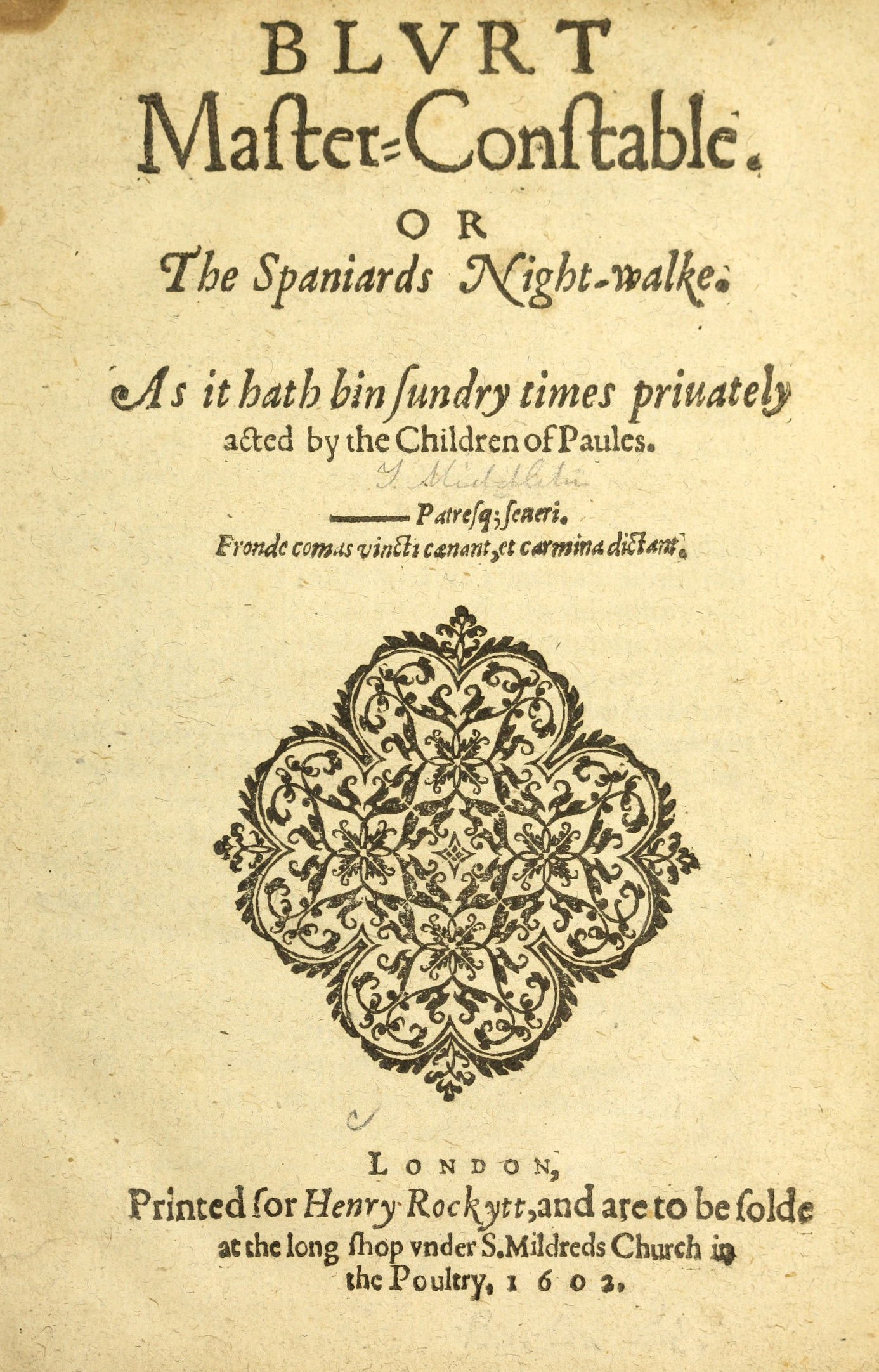
Madonna also meant "prostitute" in early modern England, as used in Thomas Dekker's Blurt, Master Constable (1602).

Madonna comes from Old Italian words of ma ("my") and donna ("lady"). The Italian word derives from the Latin phrase mea domina (or domina mea), translated into English as "my mistress". In modern Italian, "my lady" is also translated as mia donna. The name is alternatively spelled as Madona, Madonnah, and Madòna. Its short-form nicknames include Maddy, Maddie, Madge, and Donna.

Madonna was attested in the 16th century as a respectful form of address for an Italian woman. It became a loanword in the English language in 1584, defined as "an idealized virtuous and beautiful woman" (Oxford Dictionary of English, 1998). In medieval vernacular Italian, particularly in regions where northern Italian dialects were spoken, Madonna had various meanings, including a high-born lady, one's mother-in-law, and the "loved woman" during the Dolce Stil Novo period. Mea Domina or Madonna also signified the "ideal woman" to troubadours in Provence. Scholar Ksana Blank (2010) refers to this as the "cult of Lady", an image imported from Byzantium during the Middle Ages by pilgrims and crusaders and modeled on Ma domna ("My Lady" for Occitan). Blank observed that the ideal influenced European literature, including the works of troubadours, while Swiss writer Denis de Rougemont described some troubadours' views as "supremely ambiguous". In addition, Madonna was also used as a mock-respectful form of address for an Italian woman. Peruvian-Italian writer Felipe Sassone (1953) wrote that the term could convey a sense of "pagan admiration" and "pride" in a man's possession of a woman. Madonna was also used to mean "prostitute" in early modern England. The derogatory sense of the term is clear in Thomas Dekker's Blurt, Master Constable (1602).

The term Madonna was adopted as one of the titles for Mary, mother of Jesus, in the 17th century (circa the 1640s), (Note: In the religious magazine, The Monthly Packet (1875), the origins and usage of the word "Madonna" are described as the "usual address to a woman in the twelfth century"; Saints were commonly spoken of with titles of respect, but "when Madonna began to be used especially for the Blessed Virgin, we cannot say". A University of Oxford scholar explained that "its use is very common in early Italian texts" and "earlier than its devotional use as a term for 'Mother of Christ'". Artistic representations of Mary, according to publications such as the Chambers's Encyclopaedia (1866), proliferated in the 5th century when she was declared to be the "Mother of God" (Council of Ephesus). The term Madonna for artistic depictions of Mary itself came into use primarily during the Italian Renaissance.) although the word itself does not appear in the Bible. (Note: Some publications have linked or referred the word "Madonna" as a Biblical name. Nevertheless, the term itself does not appear in the biblical text.) In Christianity, the title has been particularly associated with the Roman Catholic tradition, although its usage has been documented among other Christians. Other branches of Christianity did not use it, as noted by scholars such as Joseph Darowski (2014). (Note: Certain theological, dogmatic or devotional perspectives on Mary may vary across Christian traditions, while interpretations of her also exist outside Christianity. For example, in The Splintered Divine, author Spencer L. Allen noted that some scholars "have been tempted to discuss the treatment of Mary [...] in Roman Catholic lay tradition", citing British classical scholar Hugh Lloyd-Jones, who examined Marian titles such as Madonna. In these contexts, some authors have drawn parallels between the term "Madonna" and terminology associated with mother goddesses. These comparisons include terms such as domina/mistress and mater/donna, titles prominently associated with the ancient Egyptian mother goddess, Isis, which some commentators claim were later adopted by Catholic priests for Mary. Egyptologist Flinders Petrie expressed: "We may even say, that but for the presence of Egypt we should never have seen a Madonna". A similar comparison was made by historian Will Durant and the title Nostra Domina ("Our Lady"), associated with Cybele, known in Ancient Rome as "The Great Mother of God". In Prehistoric Heritage (1979), author Felix R. Paturi contextualized the term with the concept of "Mother of God" (divine mother figure, the dea Madre, the great mother or the Magna Mater) that appeared constantly in rock paintings of prehistoric times in southern Europe, "especially in Italy". Likewise, Judith Taylor (Monsters and Madonnas, 1999), sees figures of "madonnas" as dating back to the primitive religions, calling Mary the "Madonna of contemporary times".) In other contexts, scholars and artists, such as Robert Orsi and Stephen Knapp, have referred to the word as a "Catholic term" or associated it with Catholic devotional practices. Another Christian author associated the term with Catholicism's symbolism of purity and virginity. In an article published in the linguistic journal Transactions of the Philological Society in 1957, the word was defined as "essentially a term of art criticism and hardly belongs to the religious language of England".

With the definite article (the Madonna), the term appeared as a complimentary term noting a likeness to Mary. According to the International Marian Research Institute at the University of Dayton, this designation for Mary is translated into English as "Our Lady" and into other languages as Nuestra Señora (Spanish), Notre-Dame (French), Nossa Senhora (Portuguese) or Unsere liebe Frau (German). In other languages, the nouns "madonna" or "madona" exist. Brazilian Catholic writer Plinio Corrêa de Oliveira and Pedro Chamizo of the University of Málaga, however, have both similarly observed that the noun "madonna" is "extremely infrequent" in Spanish, whereas Virgen (virgin) is commonplace, as are Notre-Dame in French or Nossa Senhora in Portuguese.

Traditionally, the Madonna primarily referred to depictions of Mary holding the infant Jesus, although the term has also been used to describe representations of Mary without him, as documented in publications dating from the 19th to the 21st centuries. This motif became one of the most popular subjects in Western Christian art, and was popularized during medieval times, particularly by Renaissance artists. According to the Encyclopædia Britannica, the term is usually restricted to Mary's devotional representations rather than narrative scenes, which depict her in a "nonhistorical context and emphasize later doctrinal or sentimental significance". Diane Apostolos-Cappadona, a religious art professor at Georgetown University, described it as "one of the most popular topics in Christian art and one that had no direct scriptural basis". In modern times, Ginny Kubitz Moyer of Paulist Fathers' publication Busted Halo reported that the term is "very familiar" to art historians thanks to Marian art. The Madonna motif has also been linked with Marian poetry and the expression of artists' "spiritual and sensual longings". Within artistic and collecting communities, some have distinguished between representations of the Madonna holding the infant and those depicting her without him, as reflected in the use of "Madonna and Child".

Throughout history, the term has acquired other meanings and has been used in various contexts relating to women. For example, "Madonna" appears as a title or descriptor in cultural, religious or artistic discussions. Madonna is also equivalent to French honorific word madame. The Madonna–whore complex (also known as "the virgin/whore complex") has been used as a concept or teaching concerning sexuality and the female body by others. Others have interpreted the term Madonna to mean "virgin" as an original Italian word, and motherhood. In other cultural contexts such as modern Japan, the word Madonna "has little to do with Mary" according to the International Comparative Literature Association. The popularity of the word in that country was attributed to novelist Natsume Sōseki in the early 20th century, when Sōseki used it as a nickname for a character in one of his publications. In the mid-1980s, the term "Madonna Boom" (or "Madonna") regained popularity in Japan following Doi Takako's emergence as the first woman in the political history of Japan to become the leader of a political party. The American singer Madonna (born 1958) also had a slight effect on that catchphrase, according to Ardath W. Burks of Rutgers University.

== Late 20th-century effects ==
=== Background ===
The 19th-century English writer based in Italy, Thomas Adolphus Trollope, described the term "Madonna" as in extenso "appropriated exclusively to the Holy Virgin". The term's exclusive association with Mary was altered following the rise to prominence of Madonna (born Madonna Louise Ciccone, 1958), an American singer whose given name and middle name were taken from her mother, Madonna Louise (née Fortin). A Brigham Young University professor noted that the ambiguation of the word "Madonna" had already begun before the advent of "Internet algorithms". The American singer was incorporated into definitions of the word in some reference works, both printed and online, including Oxford Dictionary of English (2010), and Encyclopædia Britannica since 2002, among others. However, the use of an image of the American singer to illustrate the word "Madonna" in reference works such as Microsoft Encarta also attracted criticism.

According to authors in Governing Codes (2005), the association with Mary remains popular in literature, although the American singer's figure was "much more familiar to contemporary audiences". Semiotician Victorino Zecchetto argued that in the Western system of meanings, "Madonna" evoked "only" the Virgin Mary, but following American singer's debut, the semantic field favored other interpretations. Author Michael Campbell similarly claimed that the term acquired a more contemporary image: "The pop star whose given name was enough to identify her to the world at large".

=== Common association with American singer Madonna (b. 1958) ===
Since the 1980s, the name has been particularly associated with the American pop star Madonna Ciccone.

— Lexicographer and corpus linguist Patrick Hanks, et alii (Oxford University Press, 2006.; 2013 updated)

A number of publications attributed a dominant association of the name to the American singer Madonna (born 1958) since her rise to prominence in the 1980s. The American singer's influence on search results was also noted by others, including art museum Castagnino+macro, a contributor from art institution MoMA PS1, and musician-turned-writer Alina Simone in Madonnaland (2016), who discussed the prominence of the singer's name in Google searches. In this regard, authors of Constantly Consume (2007), explained that unlike AltaVista, the dominant search engine when Google surfaced and required "labyrinthic" searches, such as "Madonna and not singer", Google simplified the query process by analyzing how often web sites are linked to other highly ranked sites. Anthologist Bruce Lansky, as reported by The Canberra Times in 1991, said: "Madonna Ciccone already has out stripped the Virgin Mother as the archetype for her name." Lansky noted Madonna as a perfect example of someone shaped by her name or, in her case, the rejection of it. In a 1996 article in New Theatre Quarterly, Mark Watts wrote that "the persona (Ciccone) can be said to be signified of the word 'Madonna'. It embodies the indescribable combination of ideas that enters our mind when we think 'Madonna' —singer, star, exhibitionist, whatever".

=== Reactions and commentary ===
Through her public persona and works, the American singer explored unorthodox ideas of female roles, including the whore complex, while also employing religious imagery in controversial ways. Maury Dean documented how she was noted for her "morality and name coincidence". In 1997, Finnish religious studies magazine Temenos commented that "several Christian critics" insisted on calling her by her second name, as Madonna is "anything but Madonna-like". According to the same magazine, critics like Godwin (1988) or Ahrnroth (1991), claimed that Madonna was her pseudonym. Brazilian Catholic writer Plinio Corrêa de Oliveira used her name in "quotation marks", while Italian onomastician, Enzo La Stella, referred to Madonna as her stage name and named her as born "Luisa Veronica Ciccone". In 2024, fact-checking website Snopes observed that some international publications had occasionally misinterpreted or mistranslated her name.

The American singer has been asked about her name on several occasions. According to author Adam Sexton (1993), the souvenir program book from her Who's That Girl World Tour (1987) quoted the singer as saying: "Madonna is my real name. It means a lot of things. It means virgin, mother, mother of earth. Someone who is very pure and innocent but someone who's very strong". According to Ahrnroth (1991), she described Madonna as a "strange name [...] I felt there was a reason. I felt like I had to live up to my name". In 2024, the American entertainment magazine People quoted her as saying: "I never had trouble with the name ... I went to Catholic schools. And then when I got involved in the music industry, everybody thought I took it was a stage name. So I let them think that ...". Biographer Andrew Morton, in his book Madonna (2001), wrote that when she ventured into the New York scene to pursue a dance career in the late 1970s, "her name automatically defined her as Catholic, ethnic and regional".

Some observers reacted critically or expressed their concern about a perceived decline in cultural literacy for the name. In a 1991 article for Irish Catholic periodical The Furrow, catechist Stephanie Walsh explored this issue from an Irish context. In The Authority of Women in the Catholic Church (2015), Catholic theologian Monica Migliorino Miller from Madonna University recognized the psyche associated with the singer, but lamented: "When the word Madonna is mentioned, it's not Mary who comes to mind but someone arguably her antithesis. [She] has managed to rise to the center of consciousness when the word is used in the public square. It's not Christ's mother who comes to mind but a crude and irreverent vocalist". A commentator claimed "once it was a name spoken with reverence, but now people have a whole new attitude toward the name", and another described: "Madonna has appropriated the word and turned the intended insult to her advantage". In contrast, Canadian academic Linda Hutcheon in Irony's Edge (2003), discusses the ironies surrounding the American singer, although she remarks that "Madonna" as the medieval title given to a woman, and that in the Italian-speaking community has the added "subliminal" idea of "ma donna" (my woman), in terms of either possessiveness or material/sexual possession, "is likely ironizable, no matter what stand you take on her personal politics".

== Popularity ==
Some international observers agreed that Madonna is a rare name for babies, even among Catholic populations, including authors of The Italian Heritage: A Companion to Literature and Arts (1998). It was not traditionally used as a given name in Italy and was first used as a name by Italian Americans. As of 2026, according to Ancestry records, the country with the highest number of recorded births of individuals named Madonna is the United States. The oldest Madonna in the United States census is Madonna Klotz (born 1843), daughter of John and Julianna in Philadelphia. The U.S. Social Security's annual baby name lists date back to 1880, but the name Madonna only began entering the top-1,000 position in 1909. The name was mildly popular through most of the first half of the 20th century. It reached an all-time peak at 536th in 1933 and made its last appearance within the top 1,000 in 1968. The American singer's early popularity helped give a slight increase in the 1980s, but it did not last long. Since 1992, fewer than 20 newly born babies have been named Madonna in the United States every year. In Finland, according to a report by the Population Register Centre in 2012, thirty babies were named Madonna, most of them since the American singer's emergence.

The American singer herself claimed to have never met anyone else with the name other than her mother while growing up. Janaya Wecker from entertainment magazine Men's Health, wrote "Not many new parents have dared to name their kid after the Queen of Pop..." Writing for Omaha World-Herald in 2016, Cleveland Evans, a Bellevue University psychology professor said that "Madonna" is still so rare as a name because "it's the premier example of a rare name so identified with one super-celebrity". He argued that "Madonna won't have many namesakes until parents of newborns no longer think only of the 'high priestess of pop' when they hear or see 'Madonna'".

Scottish lexicographer Iseabail Macleod claimed that the name was "made famous" by the American singer. British linguist David Crystal described her as a "well-known" example of a single-name. The Rock and Roll Hall of Fame (2008) referred to "Madonna" as a recognizable name worldwide, while The New Zealand Herald's Charlie Gowans-Eglinton remarked in 2020 that the American singer became "so globally famous by her mononym that I'd forgotten her surname (Ciccone)". According to Ancestry, the name's association with the Virgin Mary also continues to influence its perception, often evoking feelings of respect and admiration.

== Trademark ==
The American singer became one of the earliest celebrities to register her name for trademark in the United States in the 1980s. Her trademark for the name Madonna was recognized internationally when she won a legal case in 2000 through the United Nations' arbitration at the World Intellectual Property Organization (WIPO). In comparison, her fellow British singer Sting's case was denied by WIPO in the same year, because sting was considered "a common English word".

Business and legal publisher website JD Supra discussed a controversial case from the 1930s involving an attempt to register the trademark "Madonna Wine". Opponents argued that, in English-speaking countries, the word had become associated with the Virgin Mary. The publication wrote that, in the years following 1979, the American singer "altered and distracted from the previous and exclusive reference to the Virgin Mary". In 1993, The Trademark Reporter discussed another case, observing that "apparently, the term 'Madonna' was still believed to be generally understood as referring to the Virgin Mary in 1959. Whether that might be found true in 1993 is another question", they concluded. In 2010, the World Trademark Review reported that Swiss trademark authorities had refused to register the trademark "Madonna" for commercial use on the grounds that it could offend religious sensibilities. ABCorp attributed the decision to the influence of Switzerland's Italian-speaking population.

== List of people ==
=== Given name ===
- Madonna (born Madonna Louise Ciccone, 1958), American singer, songwriter, actress
- Madonna Bellina (fl. 1550), Jewish-Italian musician and singer
- Madonna Blyth (born 1985), Australian field hockey player
- Madonna Buder (born 1930), Roman Catholic religious sister and Senior Olympian triathlete
- Madonna Constantine, American psychology and education professor
- Madonna Gimotea (born 1974), retired gymnast from Canada
- Madonna Harris (born 1956), New Zealand multi-sportswoman
- Madonna Jarrett, Australian politician
- Madonna King, Australian journalist, author, and media commentator
- Madonna Oriente (died 1390), alleged religious figure
- Madonna Schacht (born 1940s), Australian former tennis player
- Madonna Sebastian (born 1992), Indian actress and singer
- Madonna Soctomah, Passamaquoddy politician from Maine
- Madonna Staunton (1938–2019) Australian artist and poet
- Madonna Swan (1928–1993), American Indian writer
- Madonna Tassi, Canadian vocalist
- Madonna Thunder Hawk (born 1940), Native American civil rights activist
- Madonna Marie Hines, the birth name of American singer Marie Hines

=== Surname ===
- Armando Madonna (born 1963), Italian football manager and former player
- Jon C. Madonna, retired, business executive
- G. Terry Madonna, professor
- Matthew Madonna (born 1935), street boss of the Lucchese crime family
- Paul Madonna (born 1972), American artist
- Nicola Madonna (born 1986), Italian footballer

=== Alias and stage name ===
- Madonna, a nickname of Joan Baez
- Madonna (nickname), a moniker of several individuals after the American singer
- Madonna Wayne Gacy, from the band Marilyn Manson
- Madonna, leader of 1990s gang 5T
- The Blessed Madonna (born Marea Stamper, 1977), American DJ
- Madonna Celia, pseudonym of the purported author of Lettere amorose (c. 1562)
