= Derivatives of Salome =

Derivatives of a play

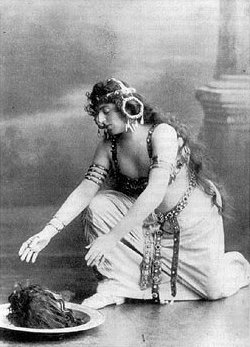
Alice Guszalewicz as Salome in the Richard Strauss opera, c. 1910. (Note: Richard Ellmann misidentified this photograph in his 1987 biography as "Wilde in costume as Salome," the error being finally corrected in 2000.)

Salome by Oscar Wilde, a play written in 1891 and first produced in 1896, has been analysed by numerous literary critics, and has prompted numerous derivatives. The play depicts the events leading to the execution of Iokanaan (John the Baptist) at the instigation of Salome, step-daughter of Herod Antipas, and her death on Herod's orders.

== Themes ==
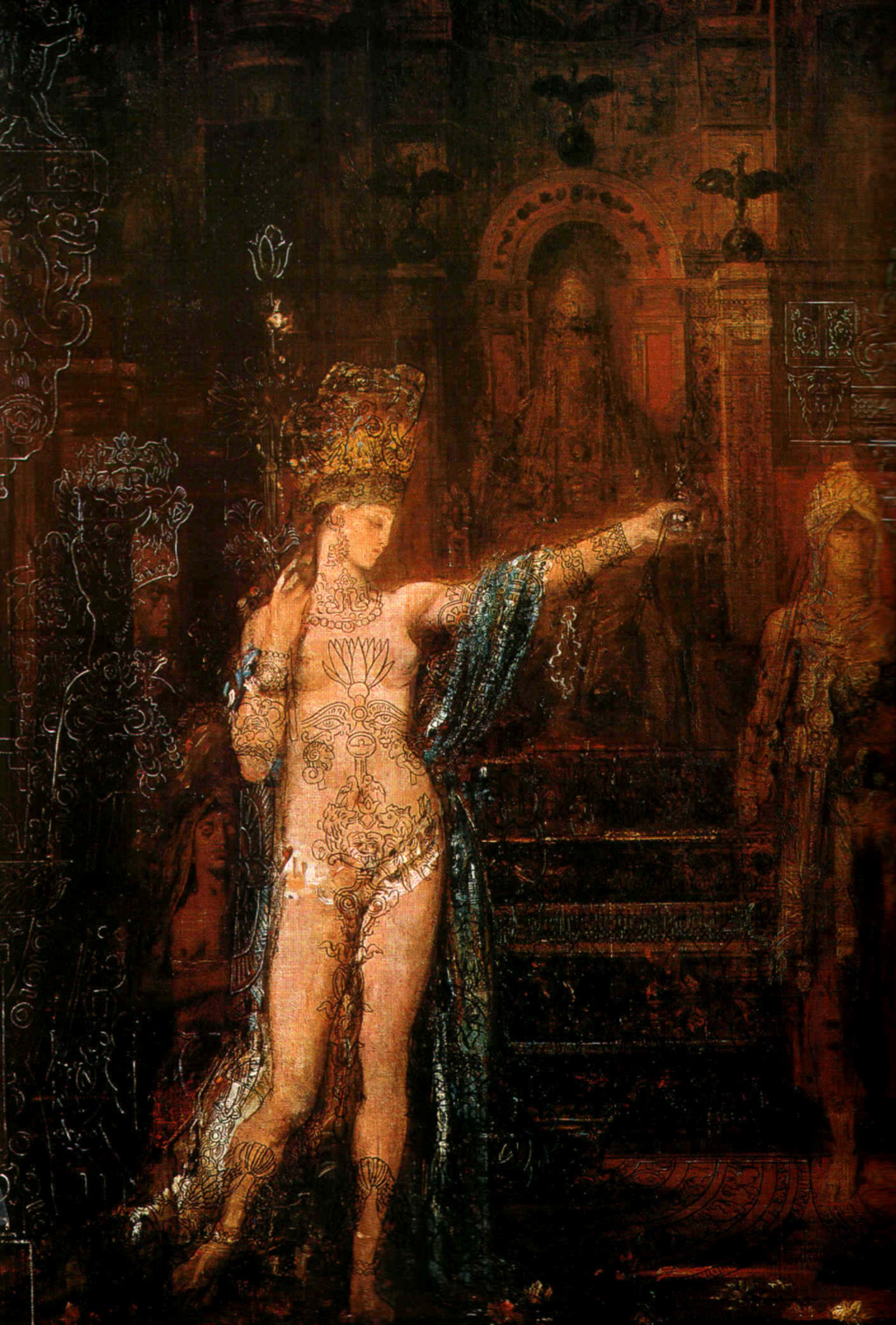
Wilde's interest in Salomé's image had been stimulated by descriptions of Gustave Moreau's paintings in Joris-Karl Huysmans's À rebours.

Some critics, including Christel Stalpaert, Bram Van Oostveldt and Jaak Van Schoor, view Wilde's Salomé as a composite of earlier treatments of the theme overlaid, in terms of dramatic influences, with the Belgian playwright Maurice Maeterlinck's characteristic methodical diction, and specifically Maeterlinck's La Princesse Maleine, 'with its use of colour, sound, dance, visual description and visual effect'.

Although the "kissing of the head" element was used in Heine and Joseph Converse Heywood's, treatments, Wilde's ingenuity was to move it to the play's climax. While his debts are undeniable, there are some novel elements in his version, such as his persistent use of parallels between Salomé and the moon. Christopher Nassaar pointed out that Wilde employs a number of the images favoured by Israel's kingly poets and that the moon is meant to suggest the pagan goddess Cybele, who, like Salomé, was obsessed with preserving her virginity and thus took pleasure in destroying male sexuality.

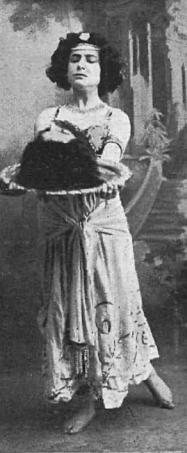
Margarita Xirgu in the Spanish premiere in 1910

Following the prelude three demarcated episodes follow: the meeting between Salomé and Iokanaan, the phase of the white moon; the major public central episode, the dance and the beheading, the phase of the red moon; and finally the conclusion, when the black cloud conceals the moon.

An argument is made by Brad Bucknell in his essay, "On "Seeing" Salomé" that the play can be seen as a struggle between the visual, in the form of various characters' gazing as well as Salomé's dance, and the written word. Salome's dance (which is never described) overpowers Iokanaan's prophecies, and Salomé herself dies due to Herod's command to crush her. As Bucknell writes of Salomé's dance, "The power of the word is inverted, turned back upon its possessors, the prophet and the ruler-figure of the tetrarch."

The idea of the gaze—specifically the male gaze—is also explored by Linda and Michael Hutcheon in "'Here's Lookin' At You, Kid': The Empowering Gaze in Salomé". In their essay, the two write that Salomé's body "clearly becomes the focus of the attention—and the literal eye—of both audience and characters. As dancer, Salomé is without a doubt the object of the gaze—particularly Herod's male gaze." The Hutcheons argue that while the male gaze has been traditionally rooted in the idea of sexual privilege, leading to a gendering of the gaze as 'male' in the first place, the character of Salomé undermines this theory by knowingly using the male gaze to her advantage, first by gaining access to Iokanaan via the male gaze and later through her dance.

Others argue that the female gaze is also present in the play, with Salome gazing and objectifying Iokanaan. As the critic Carmen Skaggs writes, "Syrian, Herod, and Salomé objectify the subjects of their gazes. They admire each one for his/her beauty alone. The desires of all three are forbidden and recognized as dangerous by those around them, but they are not persuaded to turn away".

Skaggs also discusses in her essay "Modernity's Revision of the Dancing Daughter: The Salome Narrative of Wilde and Strauss” the possible homosexual subtext of Wilde's play. Skaggs points to one instance in the play when Salome promises Narraboth a flower, a signal of homosexuality in Wilde's time. Skaggs and other critics argue that Salomé's sexuality is presented as typically masculine, which makes the relationship between her and the Young Syrian border on the homoerotic. Skaggs also argues that Wilde is attempting to explore different forms of worship, with Salome, the Young Syrian, and Herod worshiping beauty and serving as contrasts for the religious Iokanaan, whose worship revolves around God.

Salome is not named, but only referenced as "Herodias' daughter" in the Biblical story (Mark 6:22, Matthew 14:6), but Wilde chooses to make the focal point of the play the perversion of lust and desire of Salomé rather than Herodias's vengeance on John the Baptist. He uses the sexual power of the dance to construct lustful emotions, which are barred out in the biblical text. The depiction of Salome as a pawn to her mother Herodias diminishes her image as a woman of manipulation, but Wilde portrays her as a woman of power and manipulator creating this femme fatale manifestation. The kissing of John's severed head testifies to this ideal of what Bram Dijkstra calls "the virgin whore", a perversion of purity tainted by lustful desires.

Joseph Donohue, a literary scholar, believes that Wilde uses poetic licence in filling in narrative gaps from the accounts of the head on the platter story, to tease out explicitly what was written implicitly. Despite the similarities, Wilde's depiction mixes legend with biblical history, the temporal with the eternal, but also blends form and medium creating a complex rendition of sensual repulsion.

== Significance of the Dance ==
One of the primary concepts that Oscar Wilde altered in his play was the significance that the dance gets emphasised, ultimately putting it at the very core of the play. Little information had originally been provided by the Bible, with Mark's gospel simply stating, "When the daughter of Herodias came in and danced, she pleased Herod and his dinner guests" (Mark 6:22). Indeed, the daughter (Salome) isn't described in any detail whatsoever – in fact, it isn't until the early fifth century that Salomé was even given as her name by Isidore of Pelusium. During this period, Salomé's dance was mainly used by early church leaders as an example to warn against such sinfulness as the temptations of women, as well as to introduce the element of sex itself – such as Johannes Chrysostomos, who stated in the late 4th century, "Wherever there is a dance, the devil is also present. God did not give us our feet for dancing, but so that we might walk on the path of righteousness."

From this point forward, however, the Salomé narrative continually evolves – and often quite dramatically so, ultimately left bearing little resemblance to how it was used/understood in the earliest days of the Church. In Carmen Skaggs' "Modernity's Revision of the Dancing Daughter: The Salomé Narrative of Wilde and Strauss” she intimates that by expanding upon the dance in his play, “Wilde, as a Decadent writer in the nineteenth century, develops the themes of Orientalism and counter-cultural ethics. He enters the chasm of human emotion and reveals both the savage and noble heights to which humanity ascends. He explores the deeply ingrained gender ideologies of modernity and the sexual perversities of modern culture," and "by focusing the narrative upon the dancing daughter and empowering her sexuality, Wilde brings new dimension to her character."

Theodore Ziolkowski, in his "The Veil as Metaphor and as Myth," continues the idea of character development for Salomé via her dance, and points out that in Wilde's text "Salomé is placed squarely in the center of the action…her mother, fearing that the dance will only cause Herod to lust even more after her daughter, warns her repeatedly not to dance. Indeed, the dance is almost anticlimactic since Herod, unlike the biblical Herod, has already promised Salomé whatever she wants." And with this in mind, that Salome has the agency to use her dance to her own benefit instead of dancing simply on the command of the lustful Herod, Linda and Michael Hutcheon's claim in "'Here's Lookin'at You, Kid': The Empowering Gaze in Salomé" that Salomé knows the meaning of power and that "her dance is a calculated move in a game of exchange with Herod in which she offers her body as a sensual, sexual spectacle to his eyes, in return for a promise that will fulfill both her childlike willful stubbornness and her consuming sexual obsession to kiss the mouth of the resistant prophet," serves to add another, more politically minded layer to Salome's character, and takes the focus from strictly the sexual elements of Salomé's performance.

Finally, in "Scandal and the Dance: Salomé in the Gospel of Mark,” René Girard uses the developed ideas of Salomé as manipulative and politically savvy, and applies them once over to her dance, saying that her dance represents reckless desire because of the freedom of letting go and moving one's body as well as the fuel for a political scandal, driven by Salomé's desire for Iokanaan's head. Girard also incorporates Skaggs’ idea of Wilde using different cultures and influences other than the original Biblical story, and claims that Salomé's dance becomes pagan and ritualistic because it is performed for Herod's birthday, not a religious holiday, and in this circumstance, Iokanaan becomes ritual sacrifice.

== Wilde's Salomé in later art ==
=== Music ===
Wilde's version of the story has since spawned several other artistic works, the most famous of which is Richard Strauss's opera of the same name. Strauss saw Wilde's play in Berlin in November 1902, at Max Reinhardt's 'Little Theatre', with Gertrud Eysoldt in the title role, and began to compose his opera in summer 1903, completing it in 1905 and premiering it later the same year.

Also heavily influenced by the play are The Smashing Pumpkins' video for the song "Stand Inside Your Love" and U2's "Mysterious Ways"

=== Film ===
In 1918, a silent film adaptation of Wilde's play was released by Fox starring Theda Bara and directed by J. Gordon Edwards. The film, having been a relatively big-budget production exploiting the wildly popular Bara at the height of her "vamping" career, proved quite popular – yet this also contributed to some of the controversy surrounding it. Many churches in the US at the time of its release protested against what they saw as blatant immorality -with an often scantily clad Bara showcasing her sexual appeal to audiences- appearing in a film about religious subject matter

The Canon Group produced a film adaptation, Salome in 1986 directed by Claude d'Anna. In 2011 Al Pacino revisited Wilde's play, this time with a documentary-drama entitled Wilde Salomé. A version was released two years later as simply Salomé.

=== Paintings and illustrations ===
Manuel Orazi illustrated Salomé for an edition by the Société des amis du livre moderne in Paris 1930. Gino Rubert created a series of pictures in 2005.

=== Animation and video games ===
In 2009, the game developer Tale of Tales created a computer game called Fatale based on Oscar Wilde's take on the Biblical story. In the first third of the game, the player takes on the role of Iokanaan awaiting his execution as Salomé (unseen) dances above. Quotations from Wilde's Salomé appear periodically, creating what Tale of Tales calls a "whispering soundscape". In the second part of the game, the player takes on the role of Iokanaan's spirit and is tasked with blowing out the candles in the courtyard. The player is also allowed at this point to examine their surroundings. Salomé and her mother Herodias can be seen at this point. In the last part of the game, the player can only control the camera as Salomé dances. It is not outright stated from whose point of view you are watching; however, it may be Herod's as he is absent from the rest of the game. Tale of Tales took visual inspiration from the depictions of Salome painted by Lucas Cranach the Elder, Titian, and Gustave Moreau; from Rita Hayworth's performance of the Dance of the Seven Veils set to Richard Strauss's music, as well as Aubrey Beardsley's illustrations for Wilde's original manuscript. The developers of Fatale have cited "the repeated reference to looking and seeing" within Wilde's play as forming the core experience of the game.
