= Prostitution in early modern England =

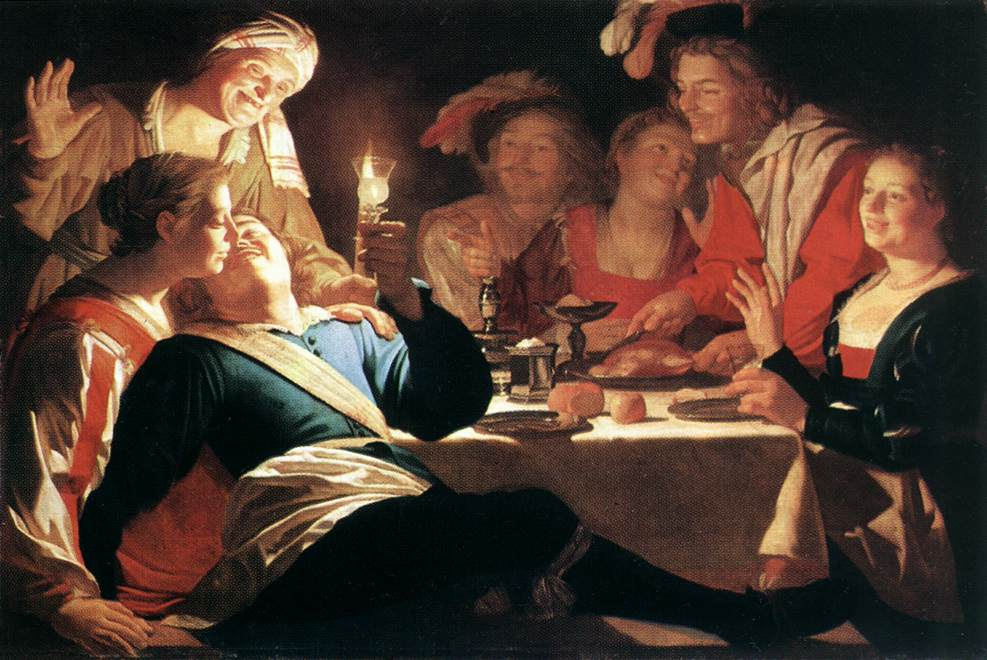
Gerrit van Honthorst, Merry Company (or The Prodigal Son), 1622, oil on canvas, 130 x 196 cm. A1te Pinakothek, Munich, inv. no. 1312 (artwork in the public domain)

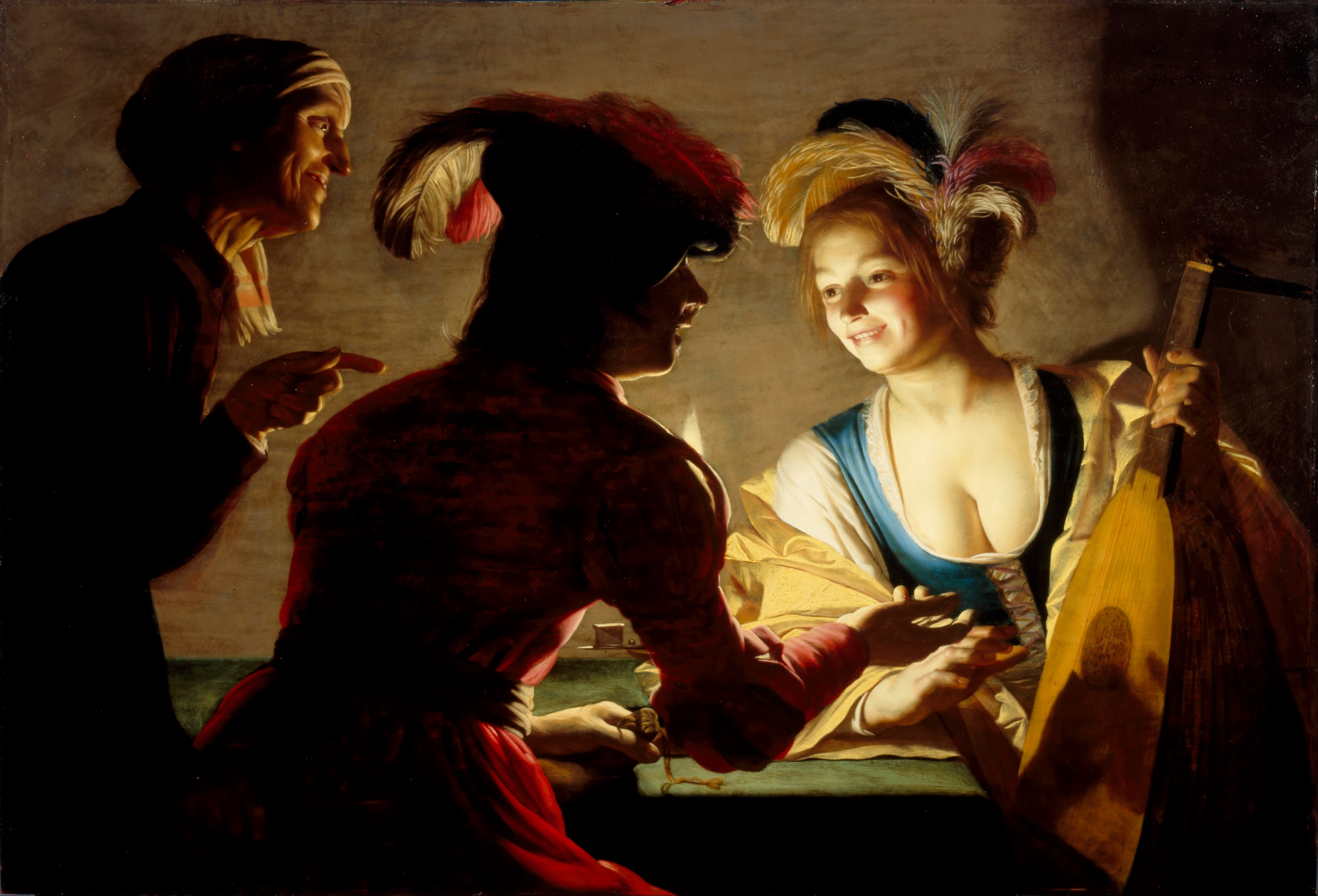
Gerrit van Honthorst, The Procuress, 1625, oil on panel, 71 x 104 cm. Centraal Museum, Utrecht, inv. no. 10786 (artwork in the public domain)

Prostitution in early modern England was defined by a series of attempts by kings, queens, and other government officials to prohibit people from working in the sex industry. There was an ebb and flow to the prohibition orders, which were separated by periods of indifference at various level of the English government. Areas like Southwark that had cultivated a reputation as a hub for prostitution and entertainment, originally outside of the jurisdiction of London, were incorporated into the city during the early modern period. Some illicit businesses in these areas continued to offer their services to interested patrons more discretely, but many brothels and related businesses reemerged in less conspicuous areas of London, disguised as other kinds of businesses.

Prostitutes represented a diverse range of economic and social classes in early modern England. Women entered the sex industry for various reasons, but the primary factor was poverty. This could refer to someone born into a lower class family, who turned to prostitution as a means of survival or to try to climb the social ranks, creating a better life for themselves. It could also include someone born into a family with a higher social class, who for a variety of reasons no longer enjoyed great wealth or status. There is no single, stereotypical version of a prostitute in early modern England.

The artwork used here depicts well-known works created by Dutch Golden Age artists. Many Dutch painters worked extensively in England. As a result, the artists were familiar with life in England, and their work was well known among the English educated class. The Dutch Golden Age artists favored scenes depicting more ordinary, every-day life, and the merry company paintings were a common genre of their work. They depict common settings and themes from taverns throughout Western Europe, during the early modern period, but they should not be treated as a literal depiction, specific only to England.

== Historical background ==
Information about prostitution in England prior to the Roman conquest is scarce, but under Roman law, prostitution in England was licensed and regulated as a legal business. Although prostitution was legal, many prostitutes were slaves, and free prostitutes were denied the rights afforded to many other Roman citizens. Initially, there was minimal direct control by the Romans, but British culture, especially in southern England, was heavily influenced by Rome. Beginning in 43 AD, there were further attempts by Rome to conquer Britain and establish a more formalized ruling system. Direct Roman control in Britain continued until approximately 410 AD.

In medieval Europe, the regulation of prostitution was done with the primary goal of maintaining social order. The well-being provided by operating in a regulated market, compared to a black market, for people working in the sex industry was not a serious concern. Decisions about the regulation of prostitution in medieval England were largely carried out at the local level of government. Although, there were some exceptions. Prostitution was not legally recognized in most towns in England. Southwark was the exception, but the other cities and towns often did very little to seriously enforce their prohibition. In 1310, all brothels in London were ordered to be shut down by royal decree. By 1393, they were tolerated in the Cock's Lane district of the city. Stews (bath houses/ brothels) were outlawed in London in 1417 in an effort to prevent them from spreading from Southwark to the rest of the city. In 1506, 18 legal stews were ordered to be shut down in Southwark for a period of time, through an order issued by the central government of the king.

== Prostitution and Christianity in Medieval Western Europe ==
Church teachings condemned the act of prostitution, and prostitutes were prohibited from burial in Christian cemeteries. Noted scholars and influential Christians, St. Augustine and St. Thomas Aquinas both viewed prostitution as a necessary evil. St. Augustine stated, "if you do away with harlots, the world will be convulsed with lust," and "take away the sewer and you will fill the palace with pollution...take away prostitutes from the world and you will fill it with sodomy" is a quote that is attributed to St. Thomas Aquinas. Any sexual act not for purpose of procreation was classified as sodomy by the church.

In 1286, the church was officially granted the responsibility of punishing "sexual misdemeanors" by King Edward I, but secular courts increasingly prosecuted people for crimes relating to prostitution and the sex trade, beginning in the early modern period. The previous policies largely consisted of indifference, combined with half-hearted enforcement or restriction to certain quarters or streets of the city (Southwark), where it was regulated. Southwark was directly administered by the bishop of Winchester, and the church began to license and tax brothels as a source of revenue. Some brothels were even directly controlled by the bishop. Prostitutes conducting business in Southwark were often referred to as "Winchester Geese," a reference to the bishop of Winchester. There is some debate about when the church began to regulate prostitution in Southwark. Some sources claim this began in the early 15th century, with the bishop backdating his order to give it more legitimacy. Other sources claim the church did license prostitution as far back as the 12th century. Whichever accounting of history is correct, the fact that the church did very little to publicly discourage prostitution in Southwark, prior to the Tudor dynasty, is not disputed by either faction.

The policy shift to strict prohibition of prostitution, with increased enforcement and punishment by secular courts, coincided with England's transition to Protestantism. Other Western European countries, transitioning away from Catholicism, underwent a similar policy shift. Prostitutes had been primarily viewed within society as sinners, needing to be reformed and saved through the teachings of the Bible. Some Protestant leaders often portrayed prostitutes, not as lost souls needing guidance through Christ's teachings but as inherently immoral persons, needing to be condemned and punished. These views grew to be held more broadly throughout society by their followers. In 1583, a building in Southwark collapsed, killing several people and injuring many others who were inside at the time. The tragic event occurred on a Sunday, and some Puritans claimed it was a "judgement from God." The new social attitudes and government policies concerning prostitution pushed the industry underground, scattering hidden brothels throughout cities. Enforcement was difficult and often ineffective.

The shift from Catholicism to Protestantism coincides with a major outbreak of sexually transmitted diseases. The outbreak had a significant and negative impact on public health. It likely influenced Protestant attitudes towards prostitution, but the extent of that influence cannot be precisely known. The public generally blamed prostitutes for facilitating the outbreak, and they were shunned and sometimes publicly ridiculed and taunted.

== Prostitution in Tudor England (1485–1603) ==
=== Henry VII ===
Brothels, during the reign of Henry VII, were often referred to as "stews". They were located in Southwark, on the South bank of the River Thames—across from London, between Maid Lane and Bankside. Southwark and London were connected by the London Bridge, the only permanent crossing for the Thames at that time. The location of the bridge likely played a role in the development of Southwark as a red-light district. Additionally, the region was known for bear and bull-baiting, as well as for its theaters and music halls. The Globe theater, famous for showing Shakespeare's plays, would eventually be built in Southwark later in the 16th century. One explanation for the term "stew" describing the bath houses and brothels in Southwark is that it originated from the stew ponds located near the bath houses, where the bishop of Winchester bred fish. Another explanation is that the name originates from the French word "estuwes", which means stove, as stoves were used to heat water at the bathhouses. In 1506 (or possibly 1503), cases of syphilis began to increase and King Henry VII shut down the "stews" in an attempt to reduce cases. However, the brothels were shut down for only a short period of time, and they eventually reopened for business. Another source cites 1503 as the year Henry VII ordered the brothels to be shut down.

=== Henry VIII and Edward VI ===
Henry VIII followed his father's order intended to shut down brothels and eliminate prostitution with new orders and regulations of his own. In 1513, he ordered that any woman caught soliciting an English soldier would be punished by having her face branded with a hot iron. Beginning in 1519, Cardinal Thomas Wolsey organized an effort to reduce prostitution around England's capital by searching for "unemployed men and loose women". There was an increased emphasis on enforcing laws against prostitution, where they existed, and harsher punishments and sentences were given to offenders. Previously, brothel keepers and prostitutes may have been fined for violating laws or regulations. These fines acted as an informal tax and revenue stream for the local governments. No real effort was made to eliminate the industry. Finally, in 1546, Henry VIII ordered that all brothels must be shut down, even those in Southwark. The prohibition order was the result of a confluence of events, including rising syphilis case numbers, efforts to reduce crime and restore law and order in areas with a high concentration of brothels, and changing social attitudes concerning prostitution. Brothel owners adapted to the situation by moving to more inconspicuous areas in London, disguising themselves as simple taverns. Most relocated to Cokkes Lane, Petticoat Lane, and Gropecunte Lane in Cheapside, but Southwark continued to be known as a place to go for illicit entertainment.

Henry VIII died in 1547, and his son Edward assumed the throne, as Edward VI, King of England and Ireland. Edward VI was only nine years old at the time of his coronation. He died before reaching the age of maturity, so England was governed by a regency council for the duration of his reign. In 1550, with John Dudley, 1st Earl of Warwick (later named 1st Duke of Northumberland) leading the regency council, Henry VIII's order to shut down the brothels in Southwark was reversed, but Southwark was officially incorporated into the city of London. Local government officials in London had long sought to control Southwark and rid it of prostitution and gambling.

=== Mary I ===
On the 24th of November, 1553, a priest, Sir Thomas Sothwood, who was given the alias of Parson Chekyn of St. Nicholas Cole Abbey in Olde Fish Street, was found guilty of offering men sex with his wife in exchange for money. Though parsons were not permitted to marry, some ignored church teachings and did so anyway, as Parson Chekyn had. He was punished by being made an example of, paraded through the streets of London in the ward of Queenhithe. He was made to ride around the city on a cart, as a means of shaming him.

In the last year of her reign, Queen Mary I sought to punish prostitutes and vagrants. She would have the disgraced run on a treadmill to generate power that was used to grind corn. Prostitutes would beat out hemp on a block with heavy wooden mallets. This would upset many men as they had fewer whores to choose from. On occasion raids would be mounted and prostitutes would be "liberated" and returned to prostitution.

=== Elizabeth I ===
Different tactics of prostitution during the time of Elizabeth I meant that prostitutes looked for work in front of waterfront taverns, gardens, and even churches. Some women even worked alone and on call. Clients who frequented a particular prostitute could pay a householder a fee to lodge that prostitute to make access to her more easy. One of the French Ambassador's stewards had such an arrangement, as well as did William Brooke, 10th Baron Cobham.

During the late Elizabethan era, there was also public concern for prostitution and female sexuality. City comedies like William Haughton’s Englishmen for My Money showed the public concern of limiting female sexuality and economic activity in urban cities like London. Although these comedies were fictional they portrayed the public's true concern about the rise in prostitution and looseness of ladies during the 16th and 17th century. Many of these City Comedies focused on “unmarried women," which is what they referred prostitutes as, indulging in premarital sex which was very frowned upon in society. As these plays became more popular they began focusing on the frivolous spending of women, married and unmarried, and how they were sexually punished, usually through anal sex, in order to correct their errors. The male authors of these works were trying to emphasize the growing issue of open female sexuality in order to regain control of society and attempt to make it more “proper”. According to these men’s thinking, if they could show how women who flaunt their money spending and earning through sexual endeavors end up being punished other women would be less likely to follow down this path.

== Prostitution in Stuart England and the Protectorate of Oliver Cromwell (1603–1707) ==
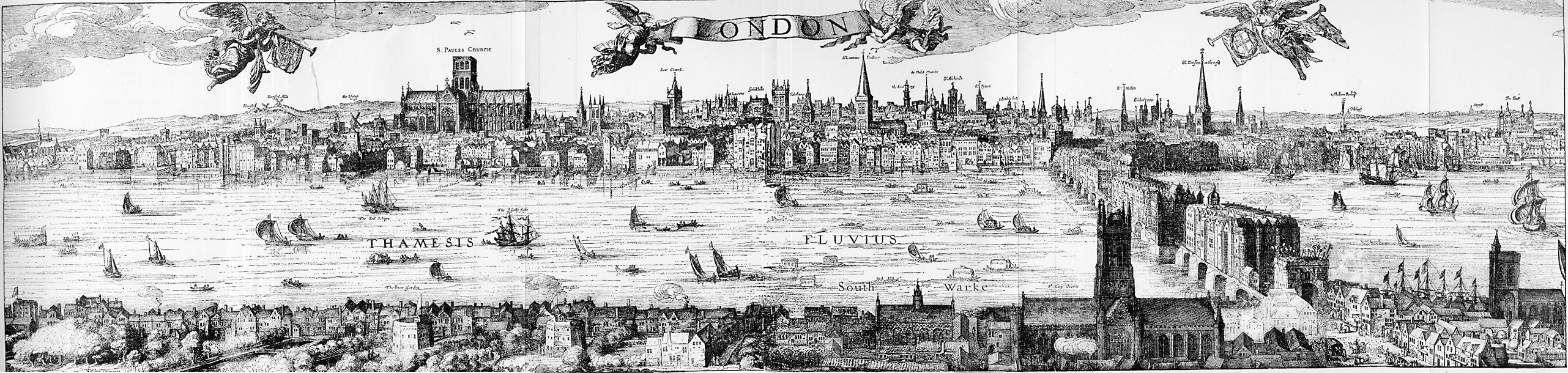
Claes Jansz. Visscher, Visscher panorama, depicting London circa1600, first published in 1616, engraving (artwork in the public domain)

=== James I and Charles I ===
James I, the first Stuart king of England from 1603 to 1625, was known to have no personal interests in prostitution in England. During this time period, it was common for men who broke the English law to be branded with the letter R on them. James I considered extending this form of punishment, and he believed that prostitutes should be the next to receive this form of public humiliation. To further decrease the number of brothels in England, James I also approved numerous raids in the 1620s. This was viewed as a tactic targeting brothels in the capital. Although the raids were deemed a failure in the long term, documents support that nineteen women were accused of owning brothels and arrested in a single day during August of 1620.

Charles I, the king of Great Britain and Ireland from 1625 to 1649, was known to hold the same standards towards prostitution like the monarchs before him. One of his goals was to decrease the ‘open bawdry’ that was widespread throughout the city. He did so by requesting that the Lord Chief Justice take the matter of prostitution into his own hands. This led to the Lord Chief’s attempt to stop the spread of ‘open bawdry’, but in the end, the brothels and their workers remained prosperous in the city.

=== Oliver Cromwell ===
Following the end of the English Civil War, the monarchy was dissolved for a time and England became a Commonwealth, and Oliver Cromwell, who lead the armies of the Parliament against the Monarchy, would become Lord Protector of the Commonwealth in late 1653. Cromwell's time as Lord Protector saw significant difficulties raised for prostitutes in London. Many brothels were taken over by merchants and effectively repurposed as warehouses. Typical areas that prostitutes would look for customers, such as alehouses, taverns, and inns, were very strictly regulated and subject to frequent raids.

=== Charles II through Anne ===
main articles: Charles II of England and Anne, Queen of Great Britain

After the restoration of the monarchy, Charles II, king of Great Britain and Ireland, held the throne from 1660 to 1685. It was said that when he took the throne, “the city erupted into one giant party which was to last for the rest of his life”. This was due to his differentiating views from the rulers who came before him. It was a known fact during this time period that Charles II enjoyed brothels, and this is why he was not as harsh as the former royals when it came to condemning prostitution. It was even rumored by one of his many mistresses, Louise de Querouaille, that Charles II had given her syphilis. However, Charles II did agree to increase the state’s control over prostitution during his reign. While in principle prostitutes were viewed as outcasts apart from English society, there were a number of very famous woman brothel owners, such as Elizabeth Cresswell and Damaris Page who rose socially because their clients included many influential men. On May 9, 1661, Charles II invoked A Proclamation, For the due Observation of certain Statutes made for the Suppressing of Rogues, Vagabonds, Beggers, and other idle disorderly persons, and for Relief of the Poore. This proclamation gave the authorities the power to return offenders, such as women accused of prostitution, back to their parish of legal settlement. However many felt that in practice a blind eye was turned. The 1668 'Bawdy House Riots' involved thousands of young men, largely apprentices, and often religious dissenters, who besieged and demolished brothels, assaulting the prostitutes and looting the properties.

Anne, the Queen of England, Scotland, and Ireland, ruled from 1702 to 1707. She was the last of the Stuarts. In the early 1700s, one in five women living in London were working as prostitutes. However, the increasing number of brothels in London were not favored by Queen Anne. This is because one of Anne's principles was her religious devotion, as she was known as the 'protector of the Anglican Church'. While English courts before her appeared as luxurious brothels, Queen Anne's was said to be cheap and dull, with no further attractions. Furthermore, Queen Anne was known to judge others for the way they lived in private. This was due to her being attracted to people who were deemed as highly religious.

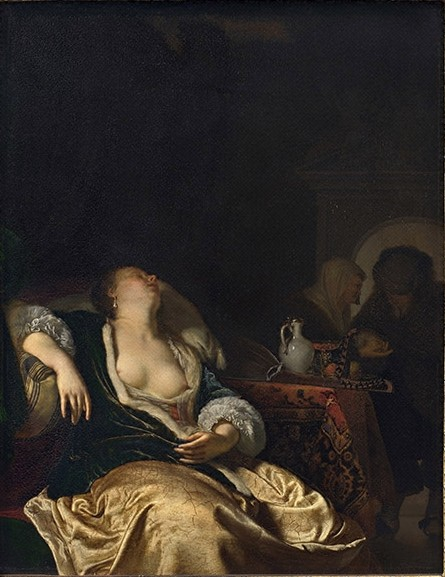
Frans van Mieris, Sleeping Courtesan, 1669 (?), oil on copper, 27.5 x 22.5 cm. Uffizi, Florence, inv. no. 1263 (artwork in the public domain)

== List of Famous Brothels ==
Well known brothels of Southwark:

- The Gun
- The Castle
- The Crane
- The Cardinal's Hat
- The Bell
- The Swan
- Holland's Leaguer

== Sexual Beliefs in Early Modern England ==
Medical knowledge of sex and sexual anatomy changed throughout the early modern period. Descriptions of the anatomy of human genitals were originally only written in Latin, but during this time period, they began being translated into English. However, only men were permitted to read these documents. An oral culture of story-telling and popular myths were mainly how women received their knowledge of sex.

In early modern England, women were generally blamed for issues of infertility, but influential medical texts from the time period actually cite men and women as equally responsible for infertility issues. For men, the medical text recommends a diet heavy in onions and parsnips to treat infertility, and for women, infertility was the result of an overly dry or slippery womb and should be treated with pessaries or fumigants. This was a popular myth used to explain why prostitutes did not conceive as many children. Medical theorists believed sex was necessary for both men and women to stay healthy. They believed both men and women produced "seed", and it was vitally important to regulate the amount of "seed" in the body by having sex. If too much "seed" were to build up in the body, specifically in men, a person could be driven to commit depraved acts or mad with rage. Remedies promoted as contraception for women included a combination of opium poppies, goose fat, honey, and "the milk of a woman", or a woman could carry "the testicles of a castrated weasel in her bosom".
