= Hutcheon =

Hutcheon is a surname which may refer to:

- David Hutcheon, Canadian municipal politician
- Duncan Selby Hutcheon (1879–1954), Canadian provincial politician
- Ernest Hutcheon (1889–1937), Australian cricketer and Olympic athlete
- Jack Hutcheon (1882–1957), Australian cricketer and barrister
- Linda Hutcheon (born 1947), Canadian postmodern theorist
- Michael Hutcheon, Canadian medical doctor and author
- Paul Hutcheon, Scottish political journalist
