= Susan Bennett (academic) =

Canadian academic

- Born: London, Ontario, Canada

Academic background
- Education: B.A, University of Kent (Canterbury); MA., PhD., 1988, McMaster University
- Thesis: The role of the theatre audience: a theory of production and reception (1988)
- Doctoral advisor: Linda Hutcheon

Academic work
- Discipline: English
- Institutions: University of Calgary
- Main interests: Shakespeare

Susan Bennett FRSC is a Canadian Professor of English in the Faculty of Humanities at the University of Calgary.

== Early life ==
Bennett was born in London to musical parents. Her father was a musician who played in theatre orchestras. As a result, she was exposed to theatre at a young age.

== Career ==
In 1990, Bennett published "Theatre Audiences: A Theory of Production and Reception" through Routledge.

In 1993, Bennett was elected an Annual Fellow of the Calgary Institute for the Humanities. From 1994 until 1996, Bennett served as president of the Canadian Association for Theatre Research. After leaving the Association, Bennett was an editor for Johns Hopkins University Press' "Theatre Journal" from 1997 until 2001. She served as the Associate Dean of Research in the University of Calgary Faculty of Humanities for five years before she was granted administrative leave.

In 2006, Bennett edited "Feminist Theatre and Performance." At the time, she also chaired the Survey Methodology Sub-Committee and sat on the National Advisory Committee for the Status of Women in Canadian Theatre. In 2013, Bennett and Christie Carson edited "Shakespeare Beyond English: A Global Experiment," which was published through the Cambridge University Press.

For the 2014–15 academic year, Bennett served as acting director of the Calgary Institute for the Humanities. She also sat on the Social Sciences and Humanities Research Council Scholarship and Fellowship Selection Committee. In December 2015, Bennett was granted a $103,382.00 Insight Grant to study "Brand Performance and the Mega-Event Experience."

In 2016, Bennett was elected a Fellow of the Royal Society of Canada. As well, she was the recipient of the 2016 Lifetime Achievement Award from the Canadian Association for Theatre Research and named a distinguished scholar. The following year, she was the recipient of a Killam Annual Professorship.

In 2017, Bennett and fellow professor of English Stefania Forlini created a new course entitled "Community Engagement through Literature." For their efforts, they were awarded the 2018 Teamwork Award from the Calgary Public Library. She also began co-editing a new Bloomsbury Methuen series titled "Theory for Theatre Studies" with Kim Solga.

== Selected publications ==
- Theatre Audiences: A Theory of Production and Reception (1990)
- Feminist Theatre and Performance (2006)
- Shakespeare beyond English (2013)
