= Xavier Rubert de Ventós =

Spanish politician (1939–2023)

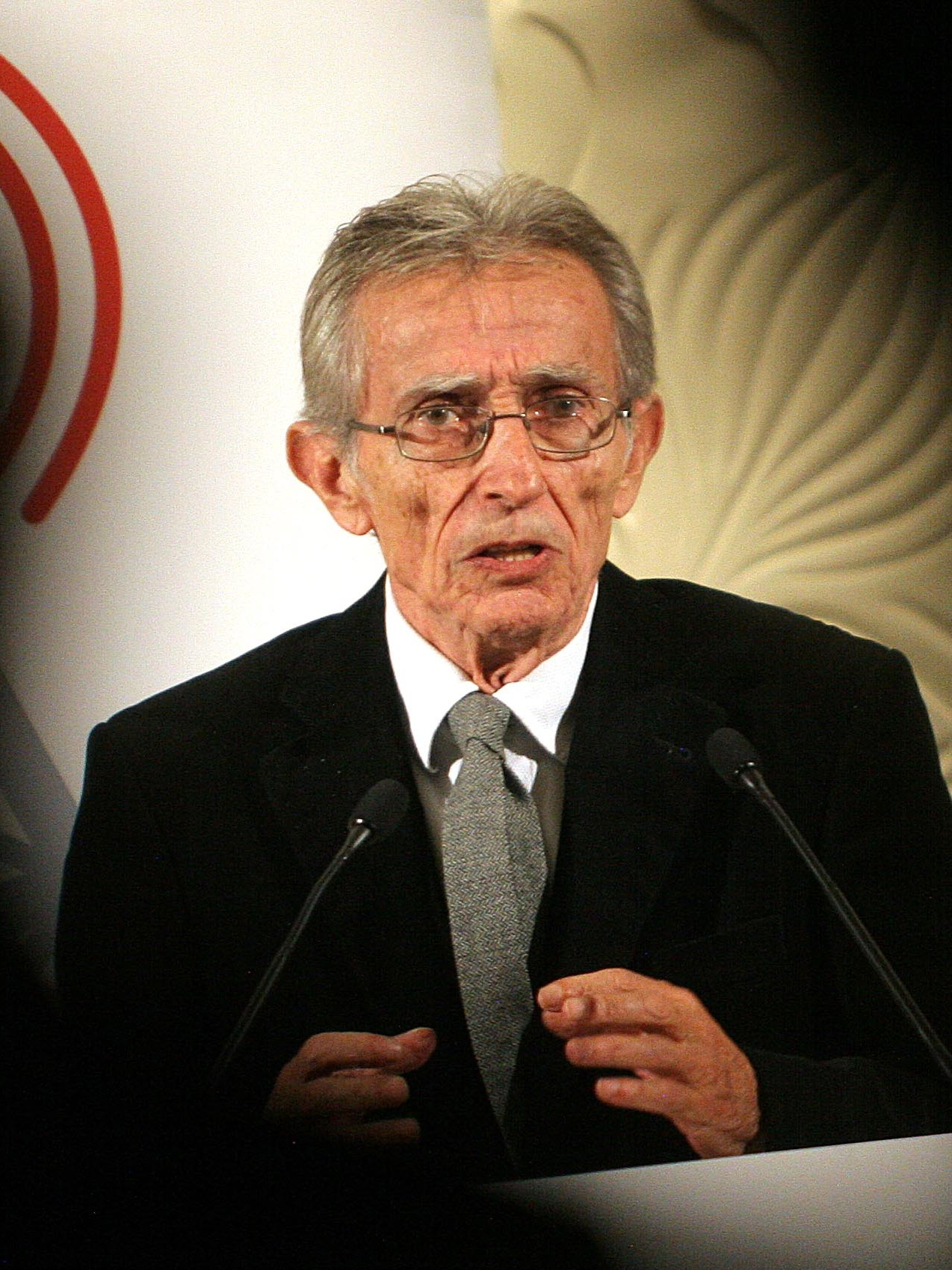
- Rubert de Ventós in 2010

Member of the European Parliament
- In office 1 January 1986 – 18 July 1994
- Constituency: Spain

Congress of Deputies in the Cortes Generales
- In office 10 November 1982 – 23 April 1986
- Constituency: Barcelona

Personal details
- Born: Xavier Rubert de Ventós; 1 September 1939 Barcelona, Catalonia, Spain
- Died: 28 January 2023 (aged 83) Barcelona, Catalonia, Spain
- Party: PSC–PSOE
- Children: Gino Rubert

Xavier Rubert de Ventós (1 September 1939 – 28 January 2023) was a Catalan philosopher, writer and politician.

== Scholarship ==
Rubert de Ventós obtained a degree in law in 1961 and a doctorate in philosophy from the University of Barcelona in 1965 with a thesis on aesthetics entitled La estética de la abstracción (The Aesthetics of Abstraction).

Rubert de Ventós served as a professor of aesthetics at the Polytechnic University of Catalonia as well as visiting professor at various American universities including Harvard, Berkeley and Cincinnati.

Rubert de Ventós created the Barcelona–New York Chair of Catalan Culture and Language and was a founding member of the New York Institute for Humanities and of the Institut d'Humanitats de Barcelona.

== Politics ==
Rubert de Ventós was arrested three times for his activities as a member of the Workers' Front of Catalonia. In 1975 threats from Falangists forced him into exile in Paris, during which time he was expelled from the University of Barcelona for abandoning his position.

A childhood friend of Pasqual Maragall, Rubert de Ventós joined the Socialist Party of Catalonia and was a member of the Spanish parliament from 1982 to 1986 and of the European Parliament from 1986 to 1994.

Rubert de Ventós was also a member of the Commission for Dignity (comisión para reparar la dignidad y restituir la memoria de las víctimas del franquismo), an entity that calls for the return to their rightful owners of documents that were confiscated at the end of the Civil War and subsequently housed in the General Civil War Archive in Salamanca.

In November 2012, he signed a public manifesto in which he supported the centre-right Convergence and Union (Convergència i Unió) in the elections to the Parliament of Catalonia.

== Works ==
=== Catalan ===
- 1968 Teoria de la sensibilitat
- 1978 Ofici de Setmana Santa
- 1983 Per què filosofia
- 1987 Pensadors catalans
- 1991 El cortesà i el seu fantasma
- 1992 De filosofia (with Mercè Rius)
- 1993 Manies i afrodismes
- 1999 Catalunya: de la identitat a la independència
- 2004 Filosofia d'estar per casa
- 2006 Teoria de la sensibilitat nacionalista
- 2012 Dimonis íntims

=== Castilian ===
- 1963 El arte ensimismado
- 1971 Moral y nueva cultura
- 1973 Utopías de la sensualidad y métodos del sentido
- 1974 La estética y sus herejías
- 1975 Ensayos sobre el desorden
- 1980 De la Modernidad. Ensayos de filosofía crítica
- 1984 Filosofía y/o Política
- 1984 Las metopías: metodologías y métodos de nuestro tiempo
- 1986 Europa y otros ensayos
- 1987 El Laberinto de la Hispanidad
- 1990 ¿Porqué filosofía? (traducción del catalán)
- 1993 Manías, amores y otros oficios
- 1994 Nacionalismos. El laberinto de la identidad
- 2000 Dios, entre otros inconvenientes

== Prizes ==
- 1963 City of Barcelona prize for El arte ensimismado
- 1969 Lletra d'Or for Teoria de la sensibilitat
- 1973 Anagrama essay prize for La estética y sus herejías
- 1987 Espejo de España prize for El laberinto de la hispanidad
- 1991 Josep Pla award for El cortesà i el seu fantasma
- 1999 St George's Cross (Creu de Sant Jordi), decoration awarded by the Catalan government
