= The Poor-Whores Petition =

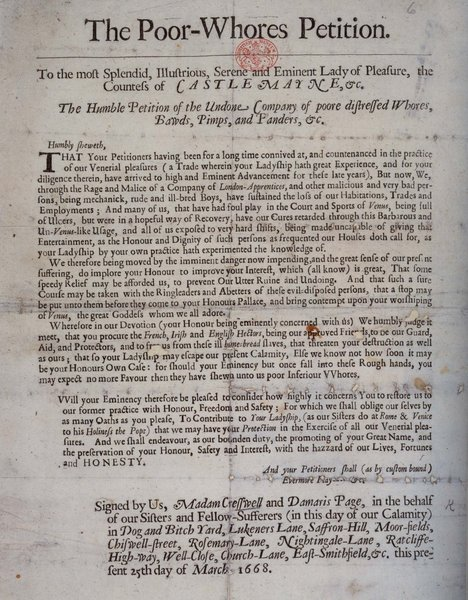
The Whores' Petition was written to Lady Castlemaine in March 1668 (full text given in file description)

The Whores' Petition (also known as The Poor Whores' Petition) was a satirical letter addressed from brothel owners and prostitutes affected by the Bawdy House Riots of 1668, to Lady Castlemaine, lover of King Charles II of England. It requested that she come to the aid of her "sisters" and pay for the rebuilding of their property and livelihoods. Addressed from madams such as Damaris Page and Elizabeth Cresswell, it sought to mock the perceived extravagance and licentiousness of Castlemaine and the royal court.

== Bawdy House Riots ==
Starting on Shrove Tuesday 1668, widespread violence swept London in a period that would become known as the 'Bawdy House Riots'. Apprentice boys and men burnt and smashed up brothels, including those owned by madams such as Damaris Page and Elizabeth Cresswell; the rioters assaulted the prostitutes and looted the properties. Many thousand London apprentices could neither afford their prostitutes nor, due to their own working contracts, legally marry. Some of the brothels were supported by the patronage of King Charles II were representative of Charles's continental Catholic-style court, awash with unaffordable debauchery.

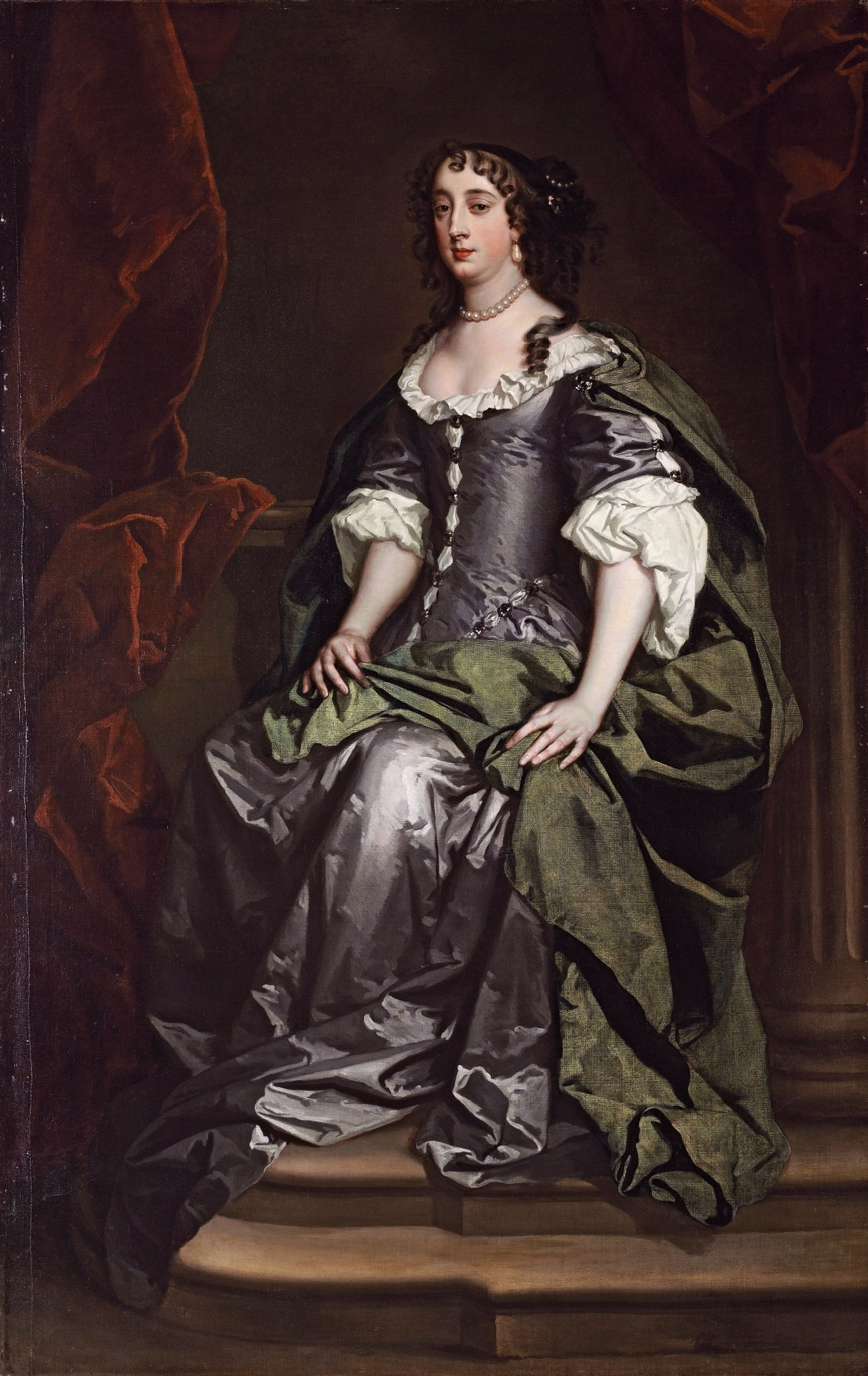
Portrait of Lady Castlemaine, mistress of King Charles II by Peter Lely

== Petition ==
Following the riot, a satirical petition began to circulate, addressed from Page and Cresswell and other London madams. Written to Lady Castlemaine, the King's lover, notorious for her own wild promiscuity, the brothel owners requested that the aristocrat act on the behalf of her 'sisters' and repay the madams for the rebuilding of their brothels, funded by the national tax coffers. They address Castlemaine as a prostitute herself, a great practitioner of "venereal pleasures", and list the sites of the brothels where her fellows struggle. It is addressed as:

The Poor Whores' Petition to the most splendid, illustrious, serene and eminent Lady of Pleasure the Countess of Castlemayne &c: The humble petition of the undone company of poore distressed whores, bawds, pimps, and panders ... Signed by us, Madam Cresswell and Damaris Page, in the behalf of our sisters and fellow sufferers (in this day of our calamity) in Dog and Bitch Yard, Lukenor's Lane, Saffron Hill, Moorfields, Chiswell Street, Rosemary Lane, Nightingale Lane, Ratcliffe Highway, Well Close, East Smithfield etc.

Given her great experience in whoring, Lady Castlemaine would, they argued, be able to deeply sympathise with prostitutes across the city. "Should your Eminency but once fall into these Rough hands", they wrote, "you may expect no more Favour than they have shewn unto us poor Inferiour Whores".

== Authorship and agenda ==
Some historians, such as Linnane, infer an active role of the addressers Page and Cresswell in the writing of the document. Others such as Mowry and Turner suggest it is an organ of political ventriloquism on behalf of anonymous, radical dissenters; a "bogus work" and "pseudo-female".

The agenda of the Petition may be interpreted in varied ways. It may taken as an anti-royalist work, lampooning Charles's court as "the great bawdy house at Whitehall", in Pepys's words. Charles was suspected of being a practising Catholic; his wife, Catherine of Braganza and brother, heir to the throne, and the future James II, were openly so, and the family was close to the French royal court. The work may be seen to mock this continental, Popish affiliation: In return for patronage, the writers offer to venerate Lady Castlemaine as their sister prostitutes in Rome and Venice venerated the Pope. However, as historian James Grantham Turner underlines, there may have been no political agenda to the letter, as Castlemaine was already the target of court wits and city satire for her lascivious reputation.

== Responses ==
The petition was a brazen act of transgressive, public satire and diarist Samuel Pepys noted that Castlemaine was "horribly vexed" by it. He writes "the times are loose and come to a great disregard of the King or Court." The letter itself was so finely tuned to the political dynamics of the day that though the printer was arrested, the court censor writes that "I can fasten nothing on The Poor Whore's Petition that a jury will take notice of." The Petition caused a flurry of broadside satires, poems and ballads on the subject through the following year. The historian James Turner terms this event as an example of a new carnivalisation of sexuality in Restoration England, where genuine political attack, satire, street commentary and bawdy theatre came together.

Many anonymous, satirical broadside responses to the Petition circulated in the London coffee houses. They included four pamphlets entitled The Gracious answer of the most illustrious lady of pleasure, the Countess of Castlem---- to the poor-whores petition; The Prentices' Answer to the Whores' Petition; The Most gracious answer of Dame Barbara CountesseofC to the peticion of undone, poore, and distressed company of Whores and The Citizen's Reply to the Whores' Petition and the Prentices' Answer.

Turner comments: "These broadsides were indeed printed, distributed, and enjoyed by the radical underground; by changing their style from fiery sermonizing to sexual mockery and ventriloquistic parody, anti-monarchist dissidents exploit the amphibiousness of festive-aggressive satire." They represented further political ventriloquism, especially on behalf of lady Castlemaine. Turner describes the transgressive satires as "mingling the political protest against absolutism and corruption with the misogynistic hatred of 'female' secrecy, passion, and influence. Castlemaine becomes a figure of extravagance and carnivalesque theatricality, an embodiment of the kind of libertines and radicals in early modern London.

== Sources ==
- Callow, John (2004). "Madam Cresswell". Oxford Dictionary of National Biography. Oxford University Press online.
- Linnane, Fergus (2007). London: The Wicked City: A Thousand Years of Prostitution and Vice. Robson. ISBN 9781861059901.
- Turner, James Grantham (2001). Libertines and Radicals in Early Modern London: Sexuality, Politics and Literary Culture, 1630–1685. Cambridge University Press. ISBN 9780521782791.
