= Patrick Hanks =

British lexicographer (1940–2024)

Patrick Wyndham Hanks (24 March 1940 – 1 February 2024) was an English lexicographer, corpus linguist, and onomastician. He edited dictionaries of general language, as well as dictionaries of personal names.

== Background ==
Hanks was educated at Ardingly College, University College, Oxford (BA, MA), and Masaryk University (PhD). After graduation from Oxford, he started his lexicographic career as editor of the Hamlyn Encyclopedic World Dictionary (1971). In 1970, he was appointed editor of Collins English Dictionary (1979). From 1980 to 1983, he was director of the Names Research Unit of the University of Essex, England, where he began a PhD under the supervision of Yorick Wilks.

In 1983, he was appointed managing editor of COBUILD, and in 1987 he took on the additional role of chief editor of English dictionaries for Collins (now HarperCollins). In the summer of 1988 and 1989, he was a visiting scientist at AT&T Bell Laboratories in Murray Hill, New Jersey, where he co-authored with Ken Church influential papers on corpus-based statistical methods in lexical analysis.

Hanks died on 1 February 2024, at the age of 83.

== Career ==
From 1990 to 2000, Hanks served as chief editor of current English dictionaries at Oxford University Press (OUP). In 1991 to 1992, he was joint principal investigator (with Mary-Claire van Leunen) of the HECTOR project at the Systems Research Center of Digital Equipment Corporation (DEC) in Palo Alto, CA. The HECTOR project was a collaboration between OUP and DEC, and although its results were never published, they served as a basis for the New Oxford Dictionary of English (1998), while the lexicographers working on it were also guinea-pig users in the development of one of the earliest search engines (AltaVista). On the basis of the COBUILD and HECTOR research in corpus analysis, Hanks began to develop his theory of Norms and Exploitations. From 2001 to 2005, he was adjunct professor of computational lexicography at Brandeis University in Waltham, MA, where he worked closely with James Pustejovsky. In 2003, he was appointed consultant and visiting scientist to the Collocations Project and Electronic Dictionary of the German Language (DWDS) at the Berlin-Brandenburg Academy of Sciences (BBAW) headed by Christiane Fellbaum. He has also served as a consultant on lexicographical methodology to the Institute of the Czech Language in Prague, to Patakis Publishers in Athens, and others.

Patrick Hanks was the author of many papers on lexical analysis, lexicography, onomastics, and similes and metaphor. He is editor in chief of the Dictionary of American Family Names (3 volumes, OUP 2003), and is co-author with Flavia Hodges and Kate Hardcastle of the Oxford Dictionary of First Names (1990, 2006). He was section editor for lexicography in the second edition of the Elsevier Encyclopedia of Language and Linguistics (ELL2; 2005), edited by Keith Brown, for which he commissioned survey articles on lexicography in all the world's major languages and on major issues in lexicography and lexicology. He edited a multivolume collection covering all aspects of lexicology for Routledge, and, with Rachel Giora, a companion collection covering all aspects of metaphor and figurative language.

From 2005 to 2009 he was a senior research associate at the Faculty of Informatics, Masaryk University, Brno, Czech Republic, where he developed the empirical procedure of Corpus Pattern Analysis, which links word meaning to patterns of word use and systematically distinguishes patterns of normal usage from creative uses. After a year in Prague at the Institute of Formal and Applied Linguistics, Charles University, Prague, he returned to England as lead researcher on the FaNUK project in the Bristol Centre for Linguistics in the University of the West of England (UWE, Bristol), researching the origins, history, and geographical distribution of family names in the UK. With Richard Coates and Peter McClure, he published The Oxford Dictionary of Family Names in Britain and Ireland in 2016.

Hanks was latterly Professor in Lexicography at the Research Institute of Information and Language Processing (RIILP) in the University of Wolverhampton, where he worked on projects in Corpus Pattern Analysis.

== See also ==
- List of lexicographers
