= Madonna Bellina =

Italian composer

Madonna Bellina (fl. 1550) was a Jewish-Italian musician and singer.

She was the subject of a poem by the Venetian playwright and satirist Andrea Calmo, who praised her musical ability. She was active as a singer as well as an instrumentalist and composer. She was praised by her contemporaries for her ability.
