= Damaris Page =

English brothel keeper, entrepreneur and property developer

Damaris Page (c. 1610 – 9 October 1669), also known as Damarose Page, was an English brothel keeper, entrepreneur and property developer in London, who was one of the most successful and famous prostitutes of her time.

== Life and career ==
Little is known of Page's early life. She was born in Stepney to John Aderson (Addersell) and worked through her teenage years as a prostitute known under the surname Page, though it is not understood how she acquired the name. On 18 April 1653 she wed James Dry at St Mary Magdalen, Bermondsey. In 1655, she was brought to court for bigamy, as it was stated that she also had been married to a William Baker of Stepney for the previous 15 years, though is likely that it was a fabricated charge as there was no evidence of this marriage in the parish registers. Page stated that the marriage to Baker was never sanctified and she was acquitted. She was concurrently charged with killing one Eleanor Pooley on whom she had tried to perform an abortion with a two-pronged-fork. For this offence she was convicted of manslaughter and would have been hanged; however, she was pregnant at the time of trial (she "pleaded her belly") and so saw out a three-year sentence in Newgate Gaol. After her release she continued her businesses as before, and remained single after the death of James Dry.

Page became rich during the boom years of economic development of the East End of London, offering services as a prostitute to the burgeoning population of seafaring workers of the docks and later through running brothels. She ran the Three Tuns in Stepney for seamen and another brothel in Rosemary Lane, near the Tower of London, for naval officers who moved in richer circles. She drew many of her prostitutes from the cohort of women whose husbands had been recruited to fight in naval battles or had been killed there, leaving their wives without any means of support. By the middle of the century Page had moved into property speculation, investing the money she made from her brothels. She built houses on the Ratcliffe Highway, north of Wapping, and around in residential areas near the Tower of London, the income from which supported her for the rest of her life.

Like other high profile bawds such as Elizabeth Cresswell, Page was almost as famous as the politicians of her time. The subject of Grub Street pamphlets in 1660, characterised as "The Wandring Whore" and the "Crafty Bawd", she may have been one of the inspirations for the character of Moll Flanders (1721), created by Daniel Defoe.

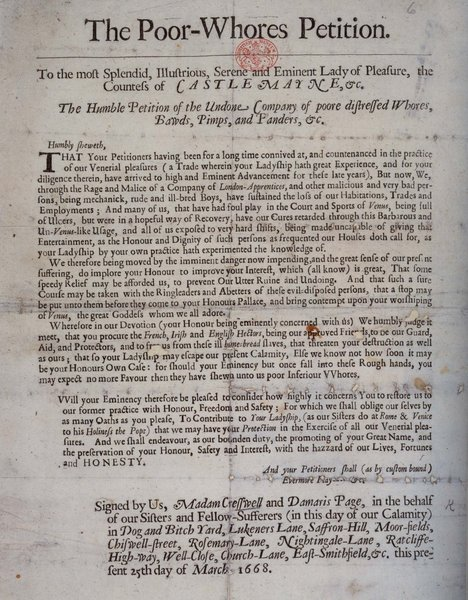
The Whores' Petition was written to Lady Castlemaine in March 1668 (full text given in file description)

Following the Restoration, Charles II greatly expanded the navy for new European wars and from the mid-1660s Page was connected with figures in the highest levels of government. Charles II's brother the Duke of York, later to be King James II, was said to favour Page's brothels. She agreed to press-gang the dock worker clientele, further building her fortune. She worked with such officers as Sir William Spragg, and it was said that "as long as Damaris Page lived he was sure he should not lack men". The practice made her deeply unpopular and her house was an early target of the 1668 'Bawdy House Riots' that occurred in March 1668. Samuel Pepys documented the attack on the property of Page "the great bawd of the seamen", "the most Famous Bawd in the Towne." She appeared before a local magistrate, Robert Manley, as a victim of the riots who had lost significant property; she was one of the main witnesses brought against Robert Sharpless, a central instigator of the riots. Her evidence was notably given significant weight during the court case, despite being an unmarried woman and a brothel keeper.

Following the riot, Page and Cresswell are listed as the addressers of The Whores' Petition, sent to Lady Castlemaine, the King's lover, notorious for her own wild promiscuity. Some historians, such as Linnane, infer an active role of the addressers Page and Cresswell in the writing of the document. Others such as Mowry and Turner suggest it is an organ of political ventriloquism on behalf of anonymous, radical dissenters. In an act of brazen public satire, the two brothel owners request that the infamous aristocrat act on the behalf of her 'sisters' and repay the madams for the rebuilding of their brothels, funded by the national tax coffers. They address Castlemaine as a prostitute herself and list the sites of the brothels where her fellows struggle. It is addressed as:

The Poor Whores' Petition to the most splendid, illustrious, serene and eminent Lady of Pleasure the Countess of Castlemayne &c: The humble petition of the undone company of poore distressed whores, bawds, pimps, and panders ... Signed by us, Madam Cresswell and Damaris Page, in the behalf of our sisters and fellow sufferers (in this day of our calamity) in Dog and Bitch Yard, Lukenor’s Lane, Saffron Hill, Moorfields, Chiswell Street, Rosemary Lane, Nightingale Lane, Ratcliffe Highway, Well Close, East Smithfield etc.

Given her great experience in whoring, Lady Castlemaine would, they argued, be able to deeply sympathise with prostitutes across the city. "Should your Eminency but once fall into these Rough hands", they wrote, "you may expect no more Favour than they have shewn unto us poor Inferiour Whores". Diarist Samuel Pepys noted that Castlemaine was "horribly vexed" by the petition. The work itself was so finely tuned to the political dynamics of the day that though the printer was arrested, the court censor writes that "I can fasten nothing on The Poor Whore's Petition that a jury will take notice of." The Petition caused a flurry of broadside satires, poems and ballads on the subject through the following year. The historian James Turner terms this event as an example of a "new carnivalisation of sexuality" in Restoration England, where genuine political attack, satire, street commentary and bawdy theatre came together.

In her last years Page became close to her sister Margaret, to whom she left money in her will. On 9 October 1669, during incarceration in the Marshalsea prison, she fell sick and died. She was buried the following day at St George the Martyr, Southwark. She had amassed a considerable fortune by the time of her death.
