= Elizabeth Cresswell =

English prostitute and brothel keeper

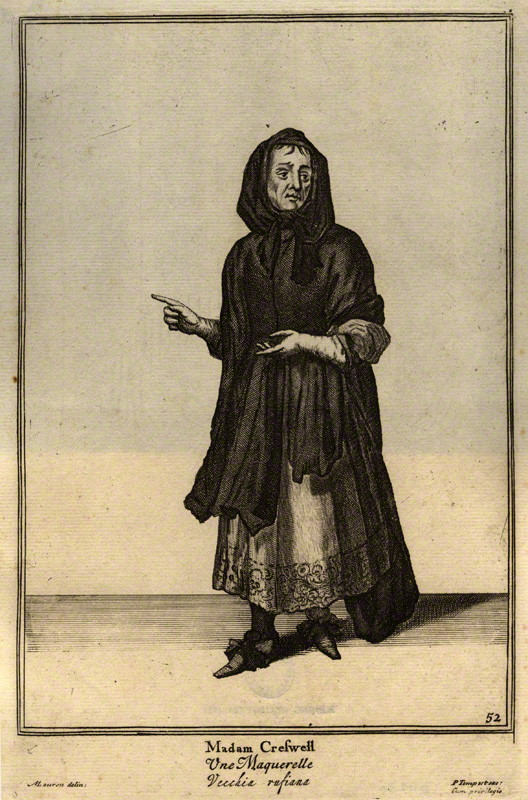
Elizabeth Cresswell

Elizabeth Cresswell (c. 1625 – c. 1698), also known as Mother Creswell and Madam Cresswell of Clerkenwell, was one of the most successful prostitutes and brothel keepers of the English seventeenth century. Starting with houses in Bartholomew Close, in the City of London and St Leonard's, Shoreditch, she built a widespread network of brothels across London, supplied with girls and women from across England. Her employees included the wives of soldiers pressed into service for Charles II and gentlewomen who had supported the Cavalier cause during the English Civil War and had since fallen on hard times. Her bawdy houses were favoured by King Charles and his court as well as powerful figures in government and city guilds. This position gave her a measure of immunity from prosecution and added to her profile as a caricature of iniquity and corruption.

During the Bawdy House Riots of 1668, apprentices smashed up brothels across London, including those belonging to Cresswell. She is listed as one of the addressers of the satirical Whores' Petition, sent to Lady Castlemaine, the King's courtesan. The letter requests help for the "sister" prostitutes who have had their livelihoods destroyed, asking that the brothels be rebuilt with money from the national tax coffers. Supporter of the prominent Whig, anti-Catholic, and anti-Carolean Thomas Player, Cresswell financed his political campaigns. In her final years she was attacked by both Protestants and Catholics: by Protestants for providing the royal court with whores, and by Catholics for financing Player's political rebellion.

Cresswell occupied a rare position in seventeenth-century England, as a person of common birth who rose to a position of high status as an independently wealthy, unmarried woman running a substantial business enterprise. She figures in a wide assortment of contemporary literature and songs, in ballads, poems, broadsides, novels and party pamphlets, often portrayed as a caricature of vice, a satirical figure of street commentary, sexual theatre and political bawdry.

== Life and career ==
Elizabeth Cresswell was born in about 1625, probably in the small village of Knockholt in Kent, England. Her middle-class Protestant family were influential, with strong connections to the powerful Percival family, favoured by King Charles I. By July 1658 Cresswell is recorded as a bawd "without rival in her wickedness", running a brothel in Bartholomew Close, a small street off Little Britain in the City of London. That month she was brought to trial in Hicks Hall, where constable John Marshall gave evidence that "Elizabeth Cresswell living in Bartholomew Close was found with divers Gentlemen and Women in her House at divers times". Marshall notes that some of the women were "sent to Bridewell", a notorious London prison. (Note: Bridewell was a prison built on the bank of the Fleet River in the City of London, between Fleet Street and the River Thames. The word "Bridewell" also came to mean any prison.) She subsequently attempted to bribe the police to avoid publicity for the court case. She was living two miles to the northeast of Bartholomew Close in St Leonard's, Shoreditch, by October 1658, when a mass of angry locals gathered at Westminster Court to give evidence against her and the prostitutes she ran from her "house". They stated that she:

... did entertain divers loose Persons, Men and Women suspected to have committed bawrdy...the said Elizabeth having lately taken a House ... for which she paid £100 for a Fine and a Rent of £40 per annum, whereunto many Persons well-habited have resorted by Day as by Nyght ... continued Drinking, Ranting, Dancing, Revelling, Swearing ... demeaning themselves as well on the Lord's Day and Fast Days. Witnesses told of seeing men and women going into rooms, 'the Woman having stript to her Bodice and Petticoat going into a room where they have shut the Casement and locked the Door ... some Company drunk about a dozen bottles of wine and further that divers Women suspected of Lightness have ... did surreptitiously slip in at a back gate whereby much infamy is brought upon the Place.

The amassed neighbours told of further infamies, such as when whores "in the habit of a Gentlewoman began to propose a Health to the Privy Member of a Gentleman ... and afterwards drank a Toast to her own Private Parts". They complained that, such was the proliferation of bawds in the area around the house, the daughters of local families were assumed to be prostitutes by the men visiting the brothel. For her iniquities, Cresswell was "sett to Hard Labour" in prison.

=== Success ===
By 1660, like her fellow Londoner Damaris Page, Mother Cresswell was regarded as one of the great figures of the London scene, with a talent for self-promotion. She declared she had "Beauties of all Complexions, from the cole-black clyng-fast to the golden lock'd insatiate, from the sleepy ey'd Slug to the lewd Fricatrix". She had a network of agents across the country who found her pretty young girls. Among her brothels, she owned one in Lincoln's Inn Fields by Whetstone Park where she sold "strong waters and fresh-faced wenches to all who had guineas to buy them with." Her headquarters were in a brothel on Back Alley off Moor Lane, near Cripplegate, where Moorgate station stands today. She also ran an office in Millbank to organise whores for local noblemen and owned both a mansion in Clerkenwell and a "House of Assignation" where women old and young could discreetly meet their lovers. She took on a cohort of Cavalier gentlewomen from formerly high circles of society who had opposed the parliamentarian uprising, their standing destroyed by the civil war. This network of women worked the alleys close to the Gresham Royal Exchange in the city, and so were known as the "Countesses of the Exchange" or "side-pillows".

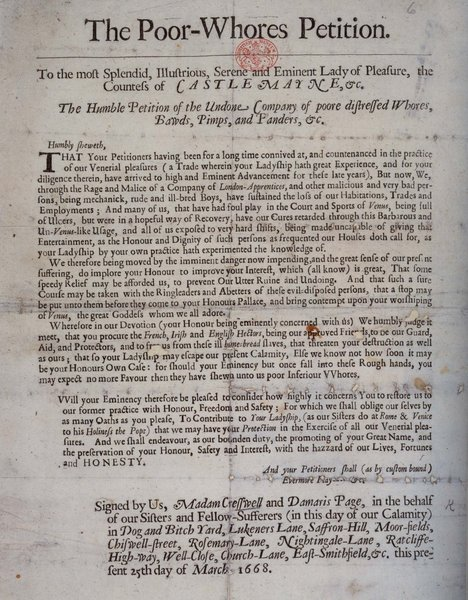
The Whores' Petition, written to Lady Castlemaine in March 1668

=== The Bawdy House Riots and the Whores' Petition ===
King Charles II patronised Cresswell's establishments, as he did those of Madam Damaris Page; he declared Cresswell's to be "a Sound organisation". She became as well known as the politicians of her time, largely shielded from legal proceedings by her extensive London network of clients across the court, the guilds and government. Her increasing immunity from prosecution furthered her stature as a hate figure, particularly with the many thousands of London apprentices who could not afford her bawds and, bound by the terms of their contracts, were forbidden to marry. The houses of Cresswell and Page were a target for the 1668 Bawdy House Riots that swept London. Starting on Shrove Tuesday, the rioting lasted for five days, as young apprentices burnt and smashed the royally supported brothels. To some, the brothels symbolised Charles's continental style court: licentious and awash with unaffordable debauchery. The apprentices attacked her "cathouse" in Moorfields, assaulting the women, tearing up the bedding, looting the property and destroying the building.

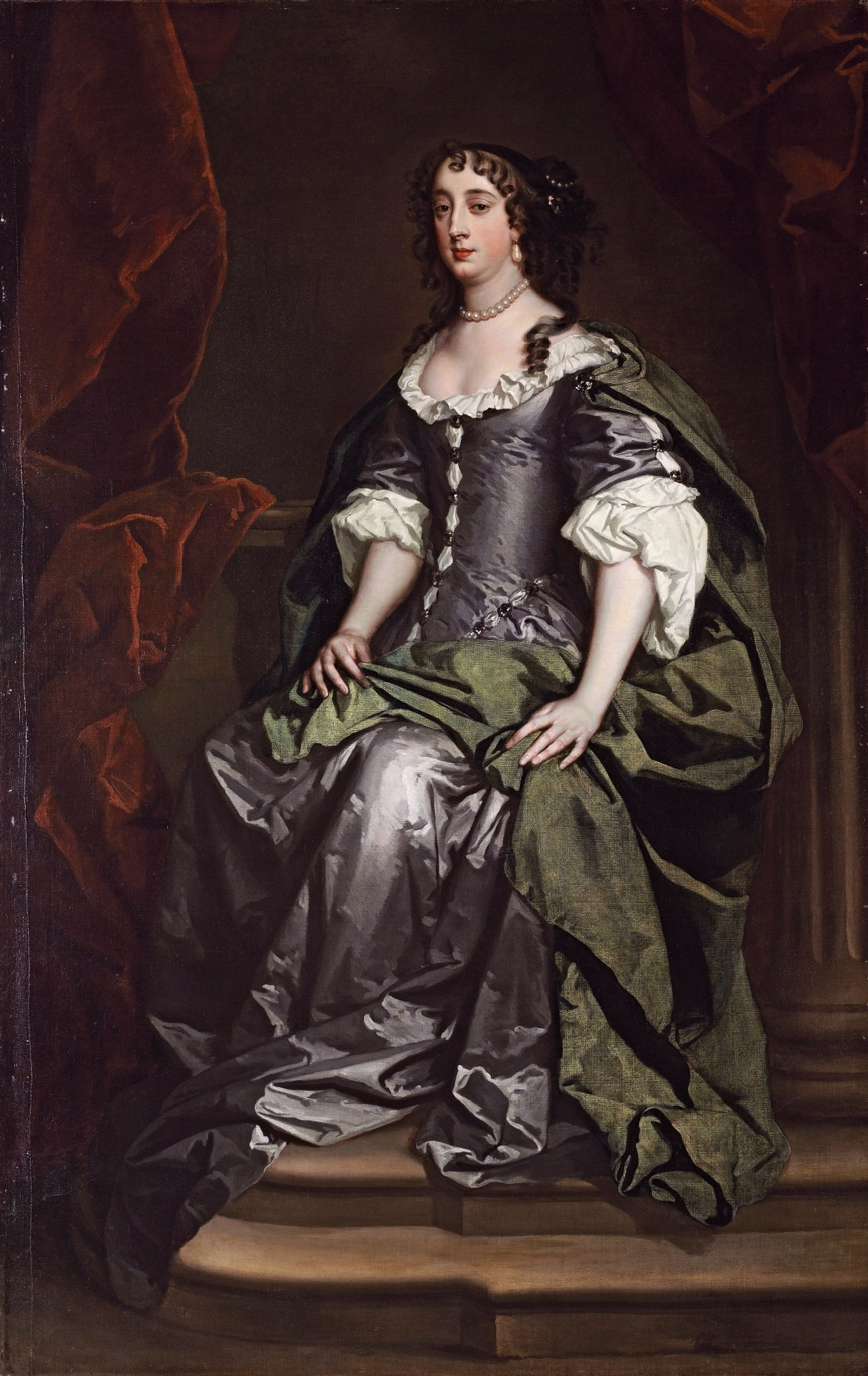
Portrait of Lady Castlemaine, mistress of King Charles II by Peter Lely

Following the riot, Page and Cresswell are listed as the addressers of The Whores' Petition, sent to Lady Castlemaine, the King's lover, notorious for her own wild promiscuity. Some historians, such as Linnane, infer an active role of the addressers Page and Cresswell in the writing of the document. Others such as Mowry and Turner suggest it is an organ of political ventriloquism on behalf of anonymous, radical dissenters. In an act of brazen public satire, the two brothel owners request that the aristocrat act on the behalf of her "sisters" and repay the madams for the rebuilding of their brothels, funded by the national tax coffers. They address Castlemaine as a prostitute herself and list the sites of the brothels where her fellows struggle. It is addressed as:

The Poor Whores' Petition to the most splendid, illustrious, serene and eminent Lady of Pleasure the Countess of Castlemayne &c: The humble petition of the undone company of poore distressed whores, bawds, pimps, and panders .... Signed by us, Madam Cresswell and Damaris Page, in the behalf of our sisters and fellow sufferers (in this day of our calamity) in Dog and Bitch Yard, Lukenor’s Lane, Saffron Hill, Moorfields, Chiswell Street, Rosemary Lane, Nightingale Lane, Ratcliffe Highway, Well Close, East Smithfield etc.

Given her great experience in whoring, Lady Castlemaine would, they argued, be able to sympathise deeply with prostitutes across the city. "Should your Eminency but once fall into these Rough hands", they wrote, "you may expect no more Favour than they have shewn unto us poor Inferiour Whores". Diarist Samuel Pepys noted that Castlemaine was "horribly vexed" by the petition. The letter itself was so finely tuned to the political dynamics of the day that though the printer was arrested, the court censor writes that "I can fasten nothing on The Poor Whore's Petition that a jury will take notice of."

The Petition caused a flurry of broadside satires, poems and ballads on the subject through the following year. The historian James Turner identifies this event as an example of a new "carnivalisation of sexuality" in Restoration England, where genuine political attack, satire, street commentary and bawdy theatre came together. Two years after the riots, a mob gathered once more and again swore they would raze Cresswell's cathouse to the ground, though protection from the local beadles prevented the attack.

=== Political affiliation ===
Cresswell never married. She was widely considered to be the lover of City Chamberlain Sir Thomas Player, nicknamed Sir Thomas Cresswell. (Note: The Oxford Dictionary of National Biography states that there is no evidence that Player was Cresswell's lover, although he did frequent her brothels.) He was a prominent Whig, an anti-Catholic, and an anti-Carolean, who gave large banquets for his political affiliates at Cresswell's house in Camberwell. These were said often to turn into orgies. On one occasion, Cresswell provisioned such a party with 300 prostitutes; the story of the night was promptly turned into a local ballad. Cresswell bankrolled Player's career during this period, which gave her leverage in the political and financial underworld but also made her fierce enemies. Player's support for the anti-Catholic rebel Titus Oates and the avowedly Protestant claimant to the throne the Duke of Monmouth proved to be his ruin. Cresswell attempted to distance herself from any political affiliation, but was ultimately attacked by Protestants for providing the royal court with whores and by Catholics for financing Player. In 1681, she was brought to trial and convicted for "over thirty years of bawdry"; during the proceedings many of her own prostitutes testified against her. Her brothel at Moorfields was taken from her, but her businesses continued as usual.

=== Last years ===
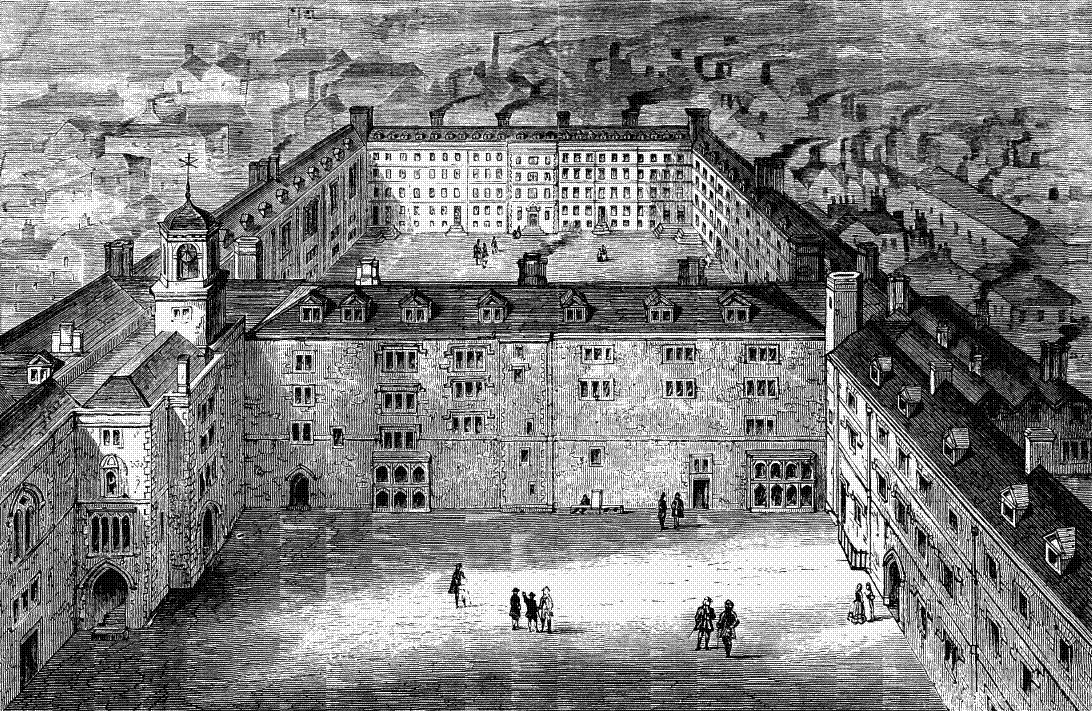
Bridewell prison in the late 17th century, rebuilt after the Great Fire in 1666

Creswell's health deteriorated towards the end of her life, probably because of tuberculosis. She appears ill and careworn in the portrait of her engraved by Marcellus Laroon, which now hangs in London's National Portrait Gallery. Cresswell was incarcerated in Bridewell Prison and she died there. Differing sources place the year of her death at some point around 1698. In her will she requested "a Decent Buryall in the Parish Church of Nockholt in the County of Kent accordynge to the Manner of the Church of England". Cresswell was not buried at Knockholt and was possibly interred in the Bridewell graveyard.

Several accounts claim that in her will she left £10 for a sermon to be read that said nothing ill of her. After a long search, a young clergyman prepared to perform the funeral rites was found. Following a lengthy sermon on social morality, he is said to have intoned: "By the will of the deceased it is expected that I should mention her and say nothing but what was well of her. All I shall say of her, therefore, is this – she was born well, lived well, and died well; for she was born with the name of Cresswell, lived at Clerkenwell, and died in Bridewell." This story appears in many sources, but is probably apocryphal.

== In contemporary media ==
Cresswell was in a rare position for many reasons. Although she was of common birth, a woman and unmarried, she rose to a position of high status, running a large business enterprise. By mid-life she was an independently wealthy woman, connected across England to rich and powerful men in government and the court. Her network of services were in high demand, counter to the religious and social morals of the day.

Cresswell's success was fed by a talent and zest for self-promotion; she openly advertised her bawdy businesses, which helped to build her own profile. She was regularly referenced in party pamphlets, street literature and ballads, and may have been one of the inspirations for the eponymous heroine of Daniel Defoe's satire Moll Flanders. Richard Head and Francis Kirkman, authors who frequented bawdy houses, wrote up and circulated graphic accounts of their encounters with "the old matron" and "her girls" in The English Rogue (1665). She is mentioned often in Nathanael Thompson's Collection of 180 Loyal Songs (1685 and 1694), the Rochester satires and Poems on State Affairs (1697–1707).

Cresswell is satirised in Thomas Otway's Venice Preserv'd as the figure providing Sir Thomas Player with unending quantities of young flesh and in the anonymous pamphlet A Letter from the Lady Cresswell to Madam C. [Cellier] the midwife (London, 1680). The Whore's Rhetorick (1683) was an anonymous translation of Ferrante Pallavicino's La Retorica della puttane (1642). Set out like a traditional text book on the ancient art of rhetoric, the adaptation featured a caricature of Cresswell as a philosopher teaching her lifetime's worth of sexual tricks and wiles to Dorethea, the fallen daughter of a ruined royalist. In this satirical parody, the madam advises her young student: "You must cloath your discourse with a meek, grave, and pious aspect, to make your sophistry pass for sincere and real". She recommends researching the nature of the client:

[THE Whore] will find it much to her advantage, to enquire particularly into the state and quality of all her Suitors affairs, to hinder any disappointment or surprize: for if she has well informed her self of their busy hours, and when the necessities of their vocation, or the impulse of pleasure, do oblige their attendance; it will be easy to appoint times of meeting, as may give general satisfaction, and enable her to observe her particular engagements.

"In the sentiment of my Rhetorick", she lectures "there is no music ought to sound more charmingly in a Whores Ears as the sweet melody created by the clashing of Gold in her own purse."
