= Irony's Edge =

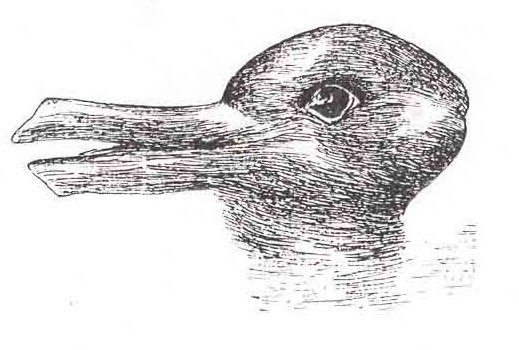
Rabbit? Duck? Both?

Irony's Edge: The Theory and Politics of Irony is a non-fiction book written by Linda Hutcheon on the subject of irony. Hutcheon rejects the traditional definition of irony as antiphrasis, or saying the opposite of what one means. Instead, she suggests that irony is a “...semantically complex process of relating, differentiating, and combining said and unsaid meanings - and doing so with an evaluative edge” (p. 85). She argues this process of differentiation and relation involves a rapid oscillation between two different meanings; denotation and connotation cannot be seen simultaneously but are also inextricable from each other. She likens this to the famous ambiguous image involving the rabbit/duck.

Drawing on the concept of the speech genre put forth by Mikhail Bakhtin, and the work on irony by Wayne Booth, Hutcheon argues that irony relies heavily on knowledge shared within what she calls discursive communities. There is a vital relationship between ironist, interpreter and cultural context that allows irony to happen. By way of example, she discusses visiting an art show in Germany where she missed the artist’s ironic intents. After several years of living in Germany, she revisited the exhibit and got much more out of it because of her insider knowledge of contemporary German culture. She also suggests that lack of shared context, combined with the evaluative "edge" of can create situations where irony misfires.

== Publication data ==
- Hutcheon, Linda. Irony’s Edge: The Theory and Politics of Irony. London and New York: Routledge, 1994, ISBN 978-0415054522.
