= Gino Rubert =

Spanish artist (born 1969)

Gino Rubert (born 1969) is a Spanish artist. He lives and works in Barcelona, Berlin and Cuernavaca (Mexico). Rubert has worked in the media of painting, video and installation art.

== Biography ==
Rubert was born in 1969 in Mexico City, the son of well-known Catalan philosopher Xavier Rubert de Ventós and Mexican psychoanalyst and writer Magdalena Catala. He studied Illustration at the Parsons School of New York and fine arts at the University of Barcelona. In 1993, he won the Sala Parés Young Painting Prize. The same year, he was also granted by the Spanish Academy in Rome in recognition of two hyper-realistic paintings.

In 2008, three paintings of his were used to illustrate both Catalan and Spanish covers for Millennium trilogy by Stieg Larsson.

He has taught at several art schools and universities such as Massana and EINA in Barcelona, Centro Cultural de España in Montevideo or Universidad Nacional de Bogotá.

== Work ==
Rubert is a multidisciplinary artist who works in a wide range of media, such as, painting, drawing, watercolor, video, installation or sculpture. Recently, he has been working on a series of paintings, drawings and little objects called “ex-votos” in reference to the homonymous Mexican devotional offers.

He is mostly known for his particular collage technique combining acrylic painting with photography, holograms, fabric, thread, plastic, human hair and other elements. The use of old and recent photographic portraits, found in marketplaces around the world, downloaded from the Internet or shot and edited by him are ever-present in his works.

Rubert cites the Post-Impressionists and their circle as his main influence, including Henri Rousseau, Bonnard, Gauguin, and Toulouse-Lautrec. Great European Masters like Fra Angelico, Jan van Eyck and Vermeer also influenced Rubert's painting. We can also find some references to avant-garde and contemporary artists such as Balthus, David Hockney, Alex Katz or Georg Baselitz. There are also visible parallels with the masters of Latin American Realismo Mágico and Surrealismo, including Frida Kahlo, Carrington, and Remedios Varo. Rubert's ideology stems from Spanish painting tradition where images are meant to create the illusion of a different space or dimension.

Rubert's works have an ironic sense of humor and are charged with a subtle and naïf eroticism. Interested in personal and sentimental complexities he explores romance and relationships in contemporary society digging deep into love, sex and couple.

Rubert's canvases often have different layers of meaning. He describes himself as “a creator of both beautiful and annoying” images that elude/avoid any narrative or lineal interpretation and he says he tries “to make images that suggest something instead of explaining a particular story”.

His works have been exhibited in several museums, galleries and cultural centers worldwide such as the Akioshiday Museum (Japan), Museo Reina Sofía (Madrid), Künstlerhaus Bethanien (Berlin), Centre de Cultura Contemporània de Barcelona, and Museu Nacional d’Art de Catalunya (Barcelona). He is represented in numerous museums and collections.

In 2011, his first novel, “Apio. Notas Caninas”, was published and awarded New Talent Literature Prize by FNAC.

== Grants and awards ==
- 2004, Shuohocho International Exchange House, Japan
- 2004, Primer Premio a la Videocreación Latinoamericana, Casa América, Madrid
- 2003, Mención Honorífica de Pintura, XXVIII Premio Bancaja de Pintura, Valencia
- 2002, II Festival de Video, Fundación Bracara Augusta, Braga, Portugal
- 2001, Primer Accésito Premi Honda-La Garriga, Spain
- 1998, XXVI Certamen Nacional de Pintura, Caja Madrid, Madrid
- 1993, Beca de la Academia Española en Roma, Rome
- 1993, Beca de la Real Academia de San Fernando, Madrid
- 1993, XXXV Premio de Pintura Joven, Sala Parés, Barcelona

== Solo exhibitions ==
- 2014, Ex-voto, Galeria Senda, Barcelona
- 2012, True Love, Claire Oliver Gallery, New York City
- 2010, Galerie Michael Haas, Berlin
- 2010, Can Sisteré Centre d'Art Contemporani, Santa Coloma de Gramenet
- 2009, Irma lentamente, Galeria Senda, Barcelona
- 2009, Círculo de lectores, Barcelona
- 2008, La lliçó d'anatomia Museu de l'Empordà, Figueres
- 2008, Spoiled Boy, Artrepco Gallery, Zürich
- 2007, Spielzimmer, Anita Beckers Gallery, Frankfurt
- 2007, True Blues, Mizuma Gallery, Tokyo
- 2006, Morocha, Galeria Senda, Barcelona
- 2006, Playtime, Museo Gustavo de Maeztu, Estella
- 2005, De generos. Museo de la Universidad de Alicante, Alicante
- 2005, Noc Noc. Museu Nacional d'Art de Catalunya, Barcelona.
- 2004, Walks & Heads. Akiyoshidai International Art Village, Yamaguchi
- 2004, Noc Noc, Palau de la Virreina, Barcelona
- 2004, Fòrum 2004 de les Cultures, Barcelona
- 2003, Delirios Colaterales, Galeria Canem, Castelló de la Plana
- 2003, Femenino Singular, Museo de Arte de la Universidad Nacional, Bogotá
- 2003, Programa del Liceu, Galeria Senda, Barcelona
- 2003, Centro Cultural de España, Miami
- 2002, La Viuda Alegre, Salon du Printemps, Montreal
- 2002, Notas Caninas, Diario Levante, Valencia
- 2002, Anunciació. Nau Côclea, Camallera
- 2002, Virginia Miller Gallery, Miami
- 1999, Diario de intramuros, Galeria Senda, Barcelona
- 1997, Self Defeated Man, David Beitzel Gallery, New York City

== Group exhibitions ==
- 2015, Bodegones y Vanitas, Galería N2, Barcelona
- 2014, Travesías, Reales Atarazanas, Valencia, Spain
- 2013, Free Style, Palacio Pedreño, Fundación Cajamurcia, Cartagena, Spain
- 2013, Olor de Cadaqués, Museu de Cadaqués, Spain
- 2012, Überall und nirgends, Reydan Weiss Collection, Villa Jauss, Oberstdorf, Germany
- 2011, Eine wunderbare Dekade, Künstlerhaus Bethanien, Berlin
- 2011, Dream and reality, Galerie Miro, Prague
- 2010, Atopia, Centre de Cultura Contemporánea, Barcelona
- 2009, Lust for Life & Dance of Death, Olbricht Collection, Kunsthalle Krems, Austria
- 2008, Go For it!, Obricht Collection, Neues Museum Weserburg, Bremen, Germany]
- 2007, Sexe i Rauxa, Museu d’Art Contemporani de Sabadell, Spain
- 2006, Ironie du Réel, Musée Melik, France
- 2005, Capturating a Momentito, Young Mexican Artists, Americas Society, New York City
- 2005, Dalimitar, Museu d’Empordá, Figueres, Spain
- 2004, Depicting Love, MNCARS, Madrid; Centro Párraga, Seville; Künstlerhaus Bethanien, Berlin
- 2004, Love Loop, Casa América de Madrid, Madrid
- 2004, Love is in the air, AECI, Montevideo, Uruguay; Nau Coclea, Camallera, Spain; Sa Nostra, Palma de Mallorca, Spain
- 2002, Love Loop, II Festival de Video, Fundación Bracara Augusta, Braga, Portugal
- 2001, Video en órbita: Cual mujer, Galería SENDA, Barcelona
- 2000, Metarrealidad, Sala Parés, Barcelona

== Museums and collections ==
- Antoni Vila Casas Foundation, Barcelona
- Banco de España Collection, Madrid
- Bruno Ragazzi Collection, Milan
- Caixa de Pensions de Barcelona Collection, Barcelona
- Caja Madrid Collection, Madrid
- Castillo Foundation, Spain
- Contemporary Art Collection, Pamplona
- Delvaux Collection, Brussels
- El Monte Foundation, Seville
- Fowler Collection, Los Angeles
- Fran Daurel Foundation, Barcelona
- Giuseppe Castiglioni Collection, Milan
- Gregory Fowler Collection, Los Angeles
- Honda Collection, Madrid
- International Catalonia University Collection, Barcelona
- La Caixa Foundation, Barcelona
- L’Oreal Collection, Madrid
- Martínez Guerricabeitia Collection, Valencia
- Olor Visual Collection, Barcelona
- San Fernando Academy, Madrid
- Scheringa Museum, Spanbroek, Netherlands
- Spanish Academy in Rome, Rome
- Thomas Olbrich Collection, Essen, Germany
- Van Damme Collection, Amsterdam
