= Bawdy House Riots of 1668 =

1668 anti-brothel riots in London

The 1668 Bawdy House Riots (also called the Messenger Riots after rioter Peter Messenger) took place in 17th-century London over several days in March during Easter Week, 1668. They were sparked by Dissenters who resented the King's proclamation against conventicles (private lay worship) while turning a blind eye to the equally illegal brothels. Thousands of young men besieged and demolished brothels throughout the East End, assaulting the prostitutes and looting the properties. As the historian Tim Harris describes it:

"The riots broke out on Easter Monday, 23 March 1668, when a group attacked bawdy houses in Poplar. The next day crowds of about 500 pulled down similar establishments in Moorfields, East Smithfield, St Leonard's, Shoreditch, and also St Andrew's, Holborn, the main bawdy house districts of London. The final assaults came on Wednesday, mainly in the Moorfields area, one report claiming there were now 40,000 rioters - surely an exaggeration, but indicating that abnormally large numbers of people were involved. ... On all days the crowds were supposedly armed with 'iron bars, polaxes, long staves, and other weapons', presumably the sort of tools necessary for house demolition. The rioters organised themselves into regiments, headed by a captain, and marching behind colours."

These were not the first anti-brothel riots in 17th-century London. Between 1603 and 1642, Shrove Tuesday riots (mostly involving attacks by apprentices on brothels and playhouses ostensibly to remove sources of temptation during Lent) had occurred at least twenty-four times. They were to some degree tolerated and the people involved had rarely been punished severely. However, the 1668 riots were different in both size and duration, involving thousands of people and lasting for several days. In their aftermath, fifteen of the rioters were indicted for high treason, and four suspected ringleaders were convicted and hanged.

Samuel Pepys recorded the events in his Diary on 24th and 25th March. He documented the attack on the property of brothel keeper Damaris Page, "the great bawd of the seamen", "the most Famous Bawd in the Towne." She was a deeply unpopular figure because of her practice of press-ganging her dock worker clientele into the navy, and her bawdy house was an early target of the riots. She appeared before a local magistrate, Robert Manley, as a victim of the riots who had lost significant property; she was one of the main witnesses brought against Robert Sharpless, a central instigator of the riots. Her evidence was notably given significant weight during the court case, despite her being an unmarried woman and a brothel keeper.

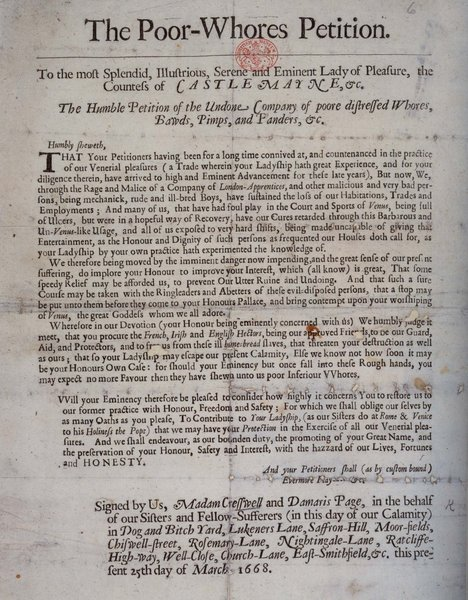
The Poor-Whores Petition

During the riots, attacks were made on the court, the Duke of York, and the bishops. Demands were made for religious toleration and protesters' slogans included "Liberty of Conscience!" Rioters drew up 'mock Petitions' from the 'poor whores' which stressed support for whores by Catholics, and by Anglicans leading the campaign against Nonconformist worship. And a satire made the point explicit in discussion of a bill to be passed in Parliament for a 'full Toleration of all Bawdy-houses' but for the suppression of 'all Preaching, Printing, Private Meetings, Conventacles, etc.' Prostitutes and brothel owners such as Damaris Page and Elizabeth Cresswell who had been affected by the riots published The Poor Whores' Petition, a satirical letter addressed to King Charles II's mistress Lady Castlemaine. It requested that she come to the aid of her "sisters" and pay for the rebuilding of their property and livelihoods, and sought to mock the extravagance and licentiousness of Lady Castlemaine and the royal court. The behaviour of the King, who had been engaged in a series of extra-marital affairs with well-known courtesans, and the debauchery in his court, were seen as one of the causes of the riots. Pepys mentions that the riots were perceived as anti-royal demonstrations by working-class apprentices centred on Moorfields, with echoes of the Puritanism of the Cromwellian era. He noted, "How these idle fellows have had the confidence to say that they did ill in contenting themselves in pulling down the little bawdy-houses, and did not go and pull down the great bawdy-house at Whitehall."
