= Michael Hutcheon =

Canadian medical doctor and author

Michael Hutcheon is a Canadian medical doctor and author. In addition to his medical specialization in respirology, Hutcheon has published widely, predominantly with Linda Hutcheon, on the subject of the representation of medicine in cultural texts.

== Select bibliography ==
- Four Last Songs: Aging and Creativity in Verdi, Strauss, Messiaen, and Britten (2015) (with Linda Hutcheon).
- Opera: The Art of Dying. Harvard University Press, 2004 (with Linda Hutcheon).
- Bodily Charm: Living Opera. Lincoln: University of Nebraska Press, 2000 (with Linda Hutcheon).
- Opera: Desire, Disease, and Death. Lincoln: University of Nebraska Press, 1996 (with Linda Hutcheon)
