= Linda Hutcheon =

Canadian academic

- Born: August 24, 1947 (age 79)

Academic background
- Education: PhD., 1975, University of Toronto
- Thesis: Narcissistic narrative: the paradoxical status of self-conscious fiction (1975)

Academic work
- Institutions: University of Toronto
- Notable students: Susan Bennett

Linda Hutcheon, FRSC, OC (born August 24, 1947) is a Canadian academic working in the fields of literary theory and criticism, opera, and Canadian studies. She is a University Professor Emeritus in the Department of English and of the Centre for Comparative Literature at the University of Toronto, where she has taught since 1988. In 2000 she was elected the 117th President of the Modern Language Association, the third Canadian to hold this position, and the first Canadian woman. She is particularly known for her influential theories of postmodernism.

== Works ==
=== Postmodernism ===
Hutcheon's publications reflect an interest in aesthetic micro-practices such as irony in Irony's Edge (Routledge, 1994), parody in A Theory of Parody (Meuthen, 1985), and adaptation in A Theory of Adaptation (Routledge, 2006). Hutcheon has also authored texts which synthesize and contextualize these practices with regard to broader debates about postmodernism, such as The Politics of Postmodernism (Routledge, 1989), A Poetics of Postmodernism (Routledge, 1988), and Rethinking Literary History (OUP, 2002). She also edited influential texts on post-modernity, chief among them being A Postmodern Reader (SUNY, 1993), co-edited with Joseph P. Natoli.

Hutcheon's version of postmodernism is often contrasted with that of Fredric Jameson in North America: while the latter laments the lack of critical capacities to which postmodern subjects have access, and analyses present capitalist cultural production in terms of a dehistoricized spatial pastiche, Hutcheon highlights the ways in which postmodern modalities actually aid in the process of critique.

Specifically, Hutcheon suggests that postmodernism works through parody to "both legitimize and subvert that which it parodies" (Politics, 101). "Through a double process of installing and ironizing, parody signals how present representations come from past ones and what ideological consequences derive from both continuity and difference" (Politics, 93). Thus, far from dehistoricizing the present or organizing history into an incoherent and detached pastiche, postmodernism can rethink history and offer new critical capacities.

Hutcheon coined the term historiographic metafiction to describe those literary texts that assert an interpretation of the past but are also intensely self-reflexive (i.e. critical of their own version of the truth as being partial, biased, incomplete, etc.) (Poetics, 122-123). Historiographic metafiction, therefore, allows one to speak constructively about the past in a way that acknowledges the falsity and violence of the "objective" historian's past without leaving one in a totally bewildered and isolated present (as Jameson has it).

=== Canadian studies ===
Many of Hutcheon's writings on postmodernism are reflected in a series of books she has written and edited on Canada. The Canadian Postmodern is a discussion of postmodern textual practices used by Canadian authors of the late twentieth century such as Margaret Atwood and Robert Kroetsch. More than the other forms she discusses, Hutcheon sees irony as particularly significant to Canadian identity.

Hutcheon argues irony is a "...semantically complex process of relating, differentiating, and combining said and unsaid meanings - and doing so with an evaluative edge" that is enabled by membership in what she describes as "discursive communities". It is through membership in a shared discursive community that the listener is able to recognize that a speaker might be attempting offer an unsaid evaluation. She argues that Canadians lack of a clear nationalist metanarrative and international influences such as history as a British colony, proximity to the United States of America, and immigration, are disposed to seeing their identities as ironic – caught up in multiple discursive communities. For Hutcheon's work on ethnic minority writing see Other Solitudes: Canadian Multicultural Fiction. Eds. Linda Hutcheon and Marion Richmond. (Oxford U.P. 1990).

=== Opera ===
Since the mid-1990s, Linda Hutcheon has published a number of books on opera with her husband Michael Hutcheon. These works often reflect her interests as a literary critic combined with his interests as a practicing physician and medical researcher.

== Selected publications ==
- Narcissistic Narrative. The Metafictional Paradox. (NY and London: Routledge, 1984).
- A Theory of Adaptation. (NY and London: Routledge, 2006).
- Opera: The Art of Dying. Harvard University Press, 2004 (with Michael Hutcheon).
- Rethinking Literary History: A Forum on Theory. New York: Oxford University Press, 2002 (with Mario J. Valdés).
- "Postmodern Afterthoughts". Wascana Review of Contemporary Poetry and Short Fiction 37.1 (2002): 5-12. [Link to article]
- Bodily Charm: Living Opera. Lincoln: University of Nebraska Press, 2000 (with Michael Hutcheon).
- "A Crypto-Ethnic Confession". The Anthology of Italian-Canadian Writing. Ed. Joseph Pivato. Toronto: Guernica Editions, 1998.
- Hutcheon, Linda (1998). "Crypto-Ethnicity" (PDF). PMLA: Publications of the Modern Language Association of America. 113 (1): 28–51. doi:10.2307/463407. JSTOR 463407. S2CID 155794856.
- Opera: Desire, Disease, and Death. Lincoln: University of Nebraska Press, 1996 (with Michael Hutcheon).
- "The Post Always Rings Twice: The Postmodern and the Postcolonial". Material History Review 41 (1995): 4-23. [Link to article]
- Irony's Edge: The Theory and Politics of Irony. London and New York: Routledge, 1994. Portuguese translation (Belo Horizonte, Brasil: Editora UFMG, 2000); final chapter reprinted in New Contexts of Canadian Criticism (Peterborough: Broadview Press, 2001).
- "Incredulity toward Metanarrative: Negotiating Postmodernism and Feminisms". Collaboration in the Feminine: Writings on Women and Culture from Tessera. Ed. Barbara Godard. Toronto: Second Story, 1994. 186–192. [Link to article]
- The Canadian Postmodern: A Study of Contemporary English-Canadian Fiction. Toronto: Oxford University Press, 1992.
- Splitting Images: Contemporary Canadian Ironies. Toronto: Oxford University Press, 1991.
- "Historiographic Metafiction: Parody and the Intertextuality of History". Intertextuality and Contemporary American Fiction. Ed. P. O'Donnell and Robert Con Davis. Baltimore: Johns Hopkins University Press, 1989. 3-32. [Link to article]
- The Politics of Postmodernism. London & New York: Routledge, 1989.
- "The Postmodern Problematizing of History". English Studies in Canada 14.4 (1988): 365–382. [Link to article]
- A Poetics of Postmodernism: History, Theory, Fiction. London & New York: Routledge, 1988.
- A Theory of Parody: The Teachings of Twentieth-Century Art Forms. 1984; rpt with new introduction; Champaign and Urbana: University of Illinois Press, 2001.
- Leonard Cohen and His Works. Toronto; ECW Press; two different essays on his poetry and fiction, probably 1992 and 1994.[Link to article]
- Narcissistic Narrative 1980, 1985, 2013.

== Awards ==
- 2016, Lorne Pierce Medal
- 2010, invested as an Officer of the Order of Canada
- 2005, awarded the Killam Prize, by the Canada Council for the Arts
- 1990, Fellow of the Royal Society of Canada
