= Street names of Soho =

This is a list of the etymology of street names in the London district of Soho, in the City of Westminster. The following utilises the generally accepted boundaries of Soho viz. Oxford Street to the north, Charing Cross Road to the east, Shaftesbury Avenue to the south and Regent Street to the west.

- Air Street – believed to be a corruption of ‘Ayres’, after Thomas Ayre, a local brewer and resident in the 17th century
- Archer Street – formerly Arch Street, presumed to be after a former archway on this site
- Argyll Street and Little Argyll Street – after John Campbell, 2nd Duke of Argyll, owner of the land in the 18th century
- Bateman's Buildings and Bateman Street – after Sir James Bateman, who owned a house on this site in the 18th century
- Beak Street – after Thomas Beak, or Beake, who owned this land in the late 17th century; the section between Upper James Street and Lexington Street was originally called Silver Street until 1883
- Berwick Street – after James FitzJames, 1st Duke of Berwick, son of James II, as the local landowner James Pollett was a Roman Catholic
- Blore Court – unknown; possibly after 19th century architect Edward Blore, who built the nearby St Luke's House (demolished 1936, now Kemp House)
- Bourchier Street – after Rev. Basil Bourchier, rector of St Anne's Church, Soho in the early 1930s; prior to renaming in 1937 it was Little Dean Street, and further back it has been known as Milk Alley and Hedge Lane
- Brewer Street – after the breweries that existed here in the 17th century; the easternmost section was formerly known as Little Pulteney Street until 1937
- Bridle Lane – thought to be after Abraham Bridle, a carpenter who leased land here in the last 17th century
- Broadwick Street – originally Broad Street, it was renamed in 1936 to avoid confusion with other Broad Streets; the easternmost section between Berwick Street and Wardour Street was formerly called Edward Street, after Edward Wardour
- Cambridge Circus – after Prince George, 2nd Duke of Cambridge, who formally opened the new development of Charing Cross Road in 1887
- Carlisle Street – after Carlisle House on Soho Square, owned by the earls of Carlisle
- Carnaby Street – after Karnaby House, owned by 17th century property developer Richard Tyler; the meaning of the ‘Karnaby’ is unknown
- Chapone Place – after famed Georgian essayist Hester Chapone, who lived nearby on Dean Street; formerly Dean's Yard
- Charing Cross Road – built 1887, and named as it led to the cross at Charing, from the Old English word "cierring", referring to a bend in the River Thames
- D'Arblay Street – after the author Frances Burney, Madame D’Arblay, who lived on Poland Street as a girl
- Dean Street – unknown; possibly by connection with Old Compton Street, named for Henry Compton, Bishop of London in the 1670s, who was also Dean of the Chapel Royal
- Denman Street – after Thomas Denman, 1st Baron Denman, 19th century attorney general, who was born here; it was formerly known Queen Street, in honour of Catherine of Braganza, wife of Charles II
- Diadem Court – unknown, though possibly from a former inn; formerly Crown Court
- Duck Lane
- Dufour's Place – from the early 18th century street builder Paul Dufour
- Falconberg Mews – after Falconberg House (demolished 1924) the former home of Thomas Belasyse, 1st Viscount Fauconberg in the 17th century
- Fareham Street – built in the early 18th century as Titchfield Street, after the Duke of Portland, Marquis of Titchfield (in Hampshire); the street was renamed in 1950 after the neighbouring town of Fareham
- Flaxman Court – after the John Flaxman, 18th – 19th century sculptor who lived on Wardour Street
- Foubert's Place – after Major Henry Foubert, who established a military riding school nearby in the 18th century
- Frith Street – after Robert Frith, late 17th century property develop in the area
- Ganton Street – unknown, though possibly after Ganton, North Yorkshire; prior to 1886 this was three separate streets - Cross Street, Cross Court and South Row
- Glasshouse Street – after a former glass factory on this site
- Golden Square – believed to be a corruption of ‘gelding’, after Gelding's Close, a field in the site prior to the square's creation in 1670
- Goslett Yard – named after A Goslett & Co, builders' merchants, who occupied a building nearby on Charing Cross Road; formerly George Yard
- Great Chapel Street – this formerly approached a Huguenot chapel on the corner with Sheraton Street (then called Little Chapel Street)
- Great Marlborough Street, Little Marlborough Street and Marlborough Court – after John Churchill, 1st Duke of Marlborough, 17th – 18th century general
- Great Pulteney Street – after Sir William Pulteney, who built the street in 1719–20; the ‘great’ prefix was to distinguish it from Little Pulteney Street, now the eastern end of Brewer Street
- Great Windmill Street – after a windmill that formerly stood near here in Ham Yard n the 17th century; the ‘great’ prefix was to distinguish it from Little Windmill Street, now Lexington Street
- Greek Court and Greek Street – after the Greek refugees, and the church they built nearby, who came here fleeing Ottoman rule in the 17th century
- Green's Court – after the paviour Thomas Green, who leased land here from Edward Wardour in 1685
- Ham Yard – after the Ham tavern, now the Lyric, on the corner with Great Windmill Street
- Hills Place – thought to be after local resident in the 1860s TH Hills; formerly Queen Street
- Hollen Street – after its builder Allen Hollen, in the 18th century
- Hopkins Street – after Richard Hopkins, who owned a lease here in the early 18th century
- Ingestre Place – after Lord Ingestre, who financed the building of an artisans’ block here in 1852; before this it was two streets – New Street and Husband Street, after Thomas Husbands, 18th century local building owner
- Kemp's Court
- Kingly Court and Kingly Street – originally ‘King Street’, in honour either of the original owner of this land of Henry III, or James II, reigning monarch when built; it was renamed in 1906 so as to avoid confusion with other King Streets
- Lexington Street – named in 1885 after the Baron Lexington, whose family – the Suttons – purchased this land in 1645; it was formerly known as Little Windmill Street
- Livonia Street – thought to be after Livonia (roughly modern Latvia), in allusion to the nearby Poland Street. Prior to 1894 it was called Bentinck Street, from the family name of the Duke of Portland, local landowners.
- Lower James Street and Upper James Street – after James Axtell, co-owner of the land when Golden Square was developed in the 1670s
- Lower John Street and Upper John Street – after John Emlyn, co-owner of the land when Golden Square was developed in the 1670s
- Lowndes Court – after William Lowndes, 16th-17th century financier and politician, who owned land here
- Manette Street – after the Manette family in Charles Dickens’ A Tale of Two Cities, part of which is set on this street
- Marshall Street – built in the 1730s by the Earl of Craven, whose seat was at Hampstead Marshall, Berkshire
- Meard Street – after John Meard, local carpenter in the 18th century
- Moor Street – unknown
- Newburgh Street
- Noel Street – after Lady Elizabeth Noel, who developed the estate on behalf of her son William Bentinck, 2nd Duke of Portland
- Old Compton Street – as with New Compton Street which extends to the east, it is believed to be named after Henry Compton, Bishop of London in the 1670s
- Orange Yard
- Oxford Circus, Oxford Circus Avenue and Oxford Street – after Edward Harley, 2nd Earl of Oxford and Earl Mortimer who owned much of the local estate; prior to this it was known as Tyburn Road, as it led to the Tyburn gibbet at what is now Marble Arch. Circus is a British term for a road junction; it was formerly Regent Circus, after Regent Street
- Peter Street – thought to be from a nearby saltpetre factory that stood here in the 17th century
- Piccadilly Circus – after Piccadilly Hall, home of local tailor Robert Baker in the 17th century, believed to be named after the pickadils (collars/hem trimmings) which made his fortune. Circus is a British term for a road junction; it was laid out by John Nash in 1819
- Poland Street – from The King of Poland, former pub on this street named in honour of the Polish victory at the Battle of Vienna
- Portland Mews – after William Bentinck, 2nd Duke of Portland, built in the 1730s
- Quadrant Arcade – simply descriptive
- Ramillies Place and Ramillies Street – after the British victory at the Battle of Ramillies in Ramillies, Belgium
- Regent Place and Regent Street – made in the 1810s by John Nash and named after the Prince Regent, later George IV
- Richmond Buildings and Richmond Mews – after Thomas Richmond, local carpenter in the 18th century
- Romilly Street – after 17th – 19th century legal reforming Samuel Romilly, who was born nearby
- Royalty Mews – after the former New Royalty Theatre on this site, demolished in the 1950s
- Rupert Street – after Prince Rupert of the Rhine, noted 17th century general and son of Elizabeth Stuart, daughter of King James I
- St Anne's Court – after the surrounding parish of St Anne's and the church, named after Saint Anne
- St Giles Circus, St Giles High Street and St Giles Passage – after St Giles Hospital, a leper hospital founded by Matilda of Scotland, wife of Henry I in 1117. St Giles was an 8th-century hermit in Provence who was crippled in a hunting accident and later became patron saint of cripples and lepers. Circus is a British term for a road junction
- Shaftesbury Avenue – after Anthony Ashley Cooper, 7th Earl of Shaftesbury, Victorian politician and philanthropist
- Sheraton Street – after Thomas Sheraton, noted furniture maker of the 18th century, who lived nearby
- Sherwood Street – corruption of ‘Sherard’; Francis Sherard was a local developer in the late 17th century
- Silver Place – unknown, possibly by association with the nearby Golden Square
- Smith's Court
- Soho Square and Soho Street – Soho was in times past open hunting ground, and it thought to have gained its name from the hunting cry of ‘soho!’; the square was formerly King Square, thought to be in honour of Charles II
- Sutton Row – Thomas Belasyse, 1st Viscount Fauconberg owned a house here in the 17th century – his country house was Sutton House in Chiswick
- Tenison Court – after the Tenison Chapel, now St Thomas, on Kingly Street; it was named after Thomas Tenison, Archbishop of Canterbury in the early 18th century
- Tisbury Court
- Tyler's Court – after Richard Tyler, late-17th century local bricklayer
- Walker's Court
- Wardour Mews and Wardour Street – named after local 17th century landowners the Wardour family, and formerly called Colman Hedge Lane after a nearby field; the section south of Brewer Street was formerly Prince Street prior to 1878, in parallel with Rupert Street
- Warwick Street – unknown; formerly Dog Lane, later Marrowbone/Marylebone Street
- Wedgewood Mews – after Josiah Wedgwood, Georgian-era manufacturer of high-quality pottery and a campaigner for social reform, who owned a pottery near here
- Wilder Walk
- Winnett Street – named after local business owner William Winnett in 1935; prior to this it was Upper Rupert Street
