= Brewer Street Car Park =

Car park in London

- Turret of the car park

General information
- Type: Car park
- Architectural style: Classical Moderne
- Location: London, England
- Coordinates: 51°30′44″N 0°08′06″W
- Completed: 1929

Design and construction
- Architects: John James Joass and Robert Sharp

Listed Building – Grade II
- Official name: Ncp Multi Storey Car Park
- Designated: 22 March 2002
- Reference no.: 1063903

Brewer Street Car Park often known by its former name Lex Garage is a Grade II listed car park on Brewer Street in Soho, London. It is currently run by National Car Parks.

== History and description ==
The site of the car park was occupied Ayres's Brewery since around 1664, named for Thomas Ayres, a brewer who also gives his name to Brewer Street. In the 1830s it was replaced by a courtyard with houses which was cleared to make way for the car park.

The building was built between 1928 in 1929 to designs by John James Joass and Robert Sharp. Their design involved an off-white exterior in a Classical Moderne or Art Deco style, a prominent feature the Byzantine inspired corner turret on the junction with Lexington Street. The space for parking runs along the rear of buildings fronting onto Lexington Street.

The building was Grade II listed in 2002, following plans to redevelop the land with offices and shops. It was listed both for its architectural significance and as a pioneering example of car parking infrastructure in London. The car park was one of the first to make use of ramps rather than lifts and included dressing rooms and a chauffeurs' club-room. In 2015 and 2016, the car park building was used to host London Fashion Week.

== See also ==
- Welbeck Street Car Park
