= London Fashion Week =

Clothing trade show in London, England

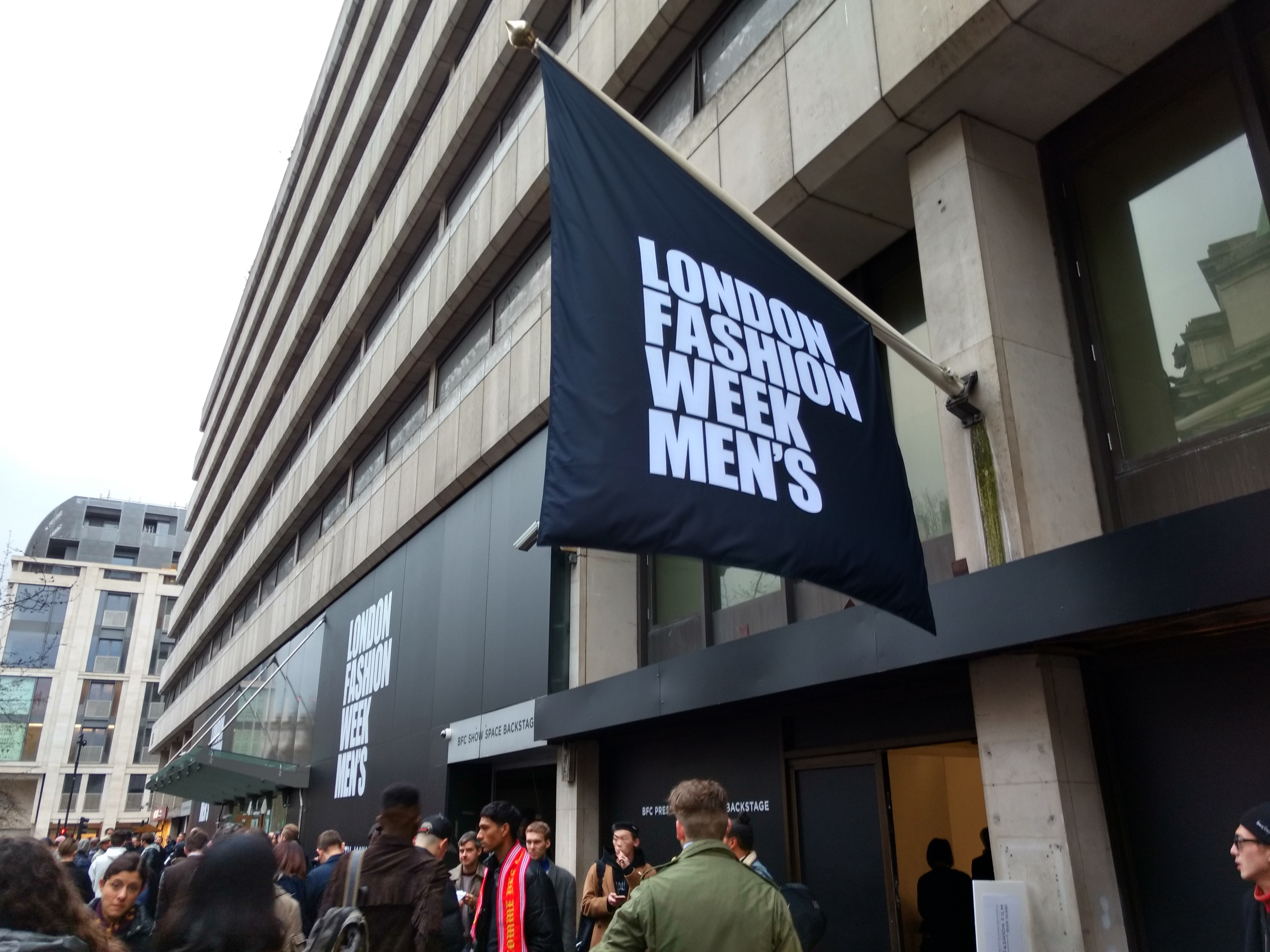
- London Fashion Week Men's in January 2017
- Genre: Fashion catwalk shows and surrounding events
- Frequency: Semi-annually
- Locations: 180 Strand, London, England
- Inaugurated: 1984 (39 years)
- Attendance: Over 5,000 press and buyers
- Organiser: British Fashion Council for the London Development Agency with help from the Department for Business, Energy and Industrial Strategy
- Website: londonfashionweek.co.uk

London Fashion Week (LFW) is a clothing trade show that takes place in London, England, twice a year, in June and September. Showcasing more than 250 designers to an audience of press members and retailers, it is one of the more prominent fashion weeks to be organized.

== History and organisation ==
Organized by the British Fashion Council (BFC) for the London Development Agency with help from the Department for Business, Innovation, and Skills, London Fashion Week first took place in February 1984. Lynne Franks had help to generate the idea of putting together the London shows into a schedule. London Fashion Week currently presents itself to funders as a trade event that also attracts significant attention from the press and benefits taxpayers. More than 5,000 press members and buyers are involved, with orders of more than £100 million placed.

A retail-focused event, London Fashion Week Festival, takes place immediately afterward at the same venue and is open to the general public.

During SS16 (shown September 2015) and AW16 (shown February 2016), British Fashion Council made the decision to host the designers' showrooms at the Vinyl Factory, situated at the active Brewer Street car park in Soho.

Following increasing numbers of anti-fur protesters, the London Fashion Week held in September 2018 was the first major fashion week to be fur-free.

In late 2024, a British Fashion Council representative told Parliament that exotic skins — such as alligator, snake and reptile — would be banned from the event as of 2025.

== Official venues ==
Since its inception in 1984, London Fashion Week (LFW) has utilized various official venues. The inaugural event in March 1984 took place in the car park of the Commonwealth Institute in Kensington. It featured 15 catwalk shows from designers such as Vivienne Westwood, David Fielden, Ghost, and Betty Jackson.

In September 1984, LFW moved to the Duke of York's Barracks on King's Road, remaining there for three seasons before relocating to the larger Olympia venue in March 1986. The early 1990s recession prompted another move, this time to The Ritz Hotel in 1992, where Alexander McQueen showcased his work for the first time since his graduate collection.

By 1994, the official venue shifted to the grounds of the Natural History Museum, with marquees set up for runway shows and showrooms. In September 2002, LFW returned to the Duke of York's Headquarters on King's Road, but due to planning permission issues, it relocated to Battersea Park in February 2005.

In 2009, Somerset House became the new venue, hosting LFW until September 2015, when the event moved to the Brewer Street Car Park in Soho.

The venue was changed again in February 2017 to the Store Studios at 180 Strand, where LFW remained until February 2020.

The COVID-19 pandemic led to the cancellation of physical shows in September 2020. The first LFW event with a live audience after the pandemic was in June 2021. Since then, the British Fashion Council (BFC) has adopted a hybrid digital-physical approach, resulting in no official LFW venue since February 2020.

== Events ==
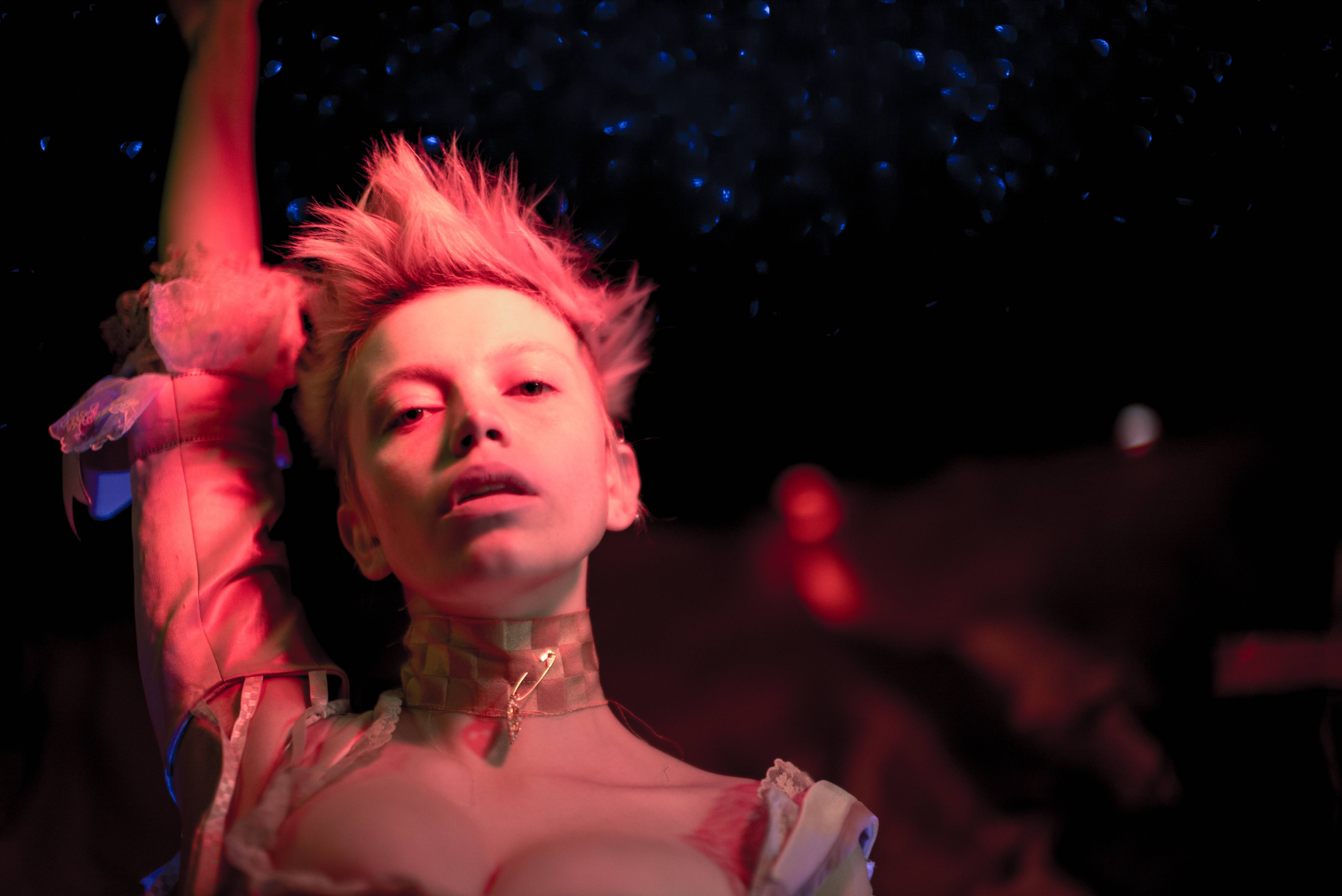
Portrait of a female model made at London Fashion Week in 2016

=== Live streaming ===
In 2009, Burberry returned from showing in Milan to showing in London and the show was live-streamed. This began an era of "see now, buy now" shows. In spring 2010, London Fashion Week became the first of the "Big Four" fashion weeks to offer designers showing collections on the catwalk at Somerset House the opportunity to broadcast their shows live on the Internet.

== London Fashion Week Men's ==
In June 2012, the British Fashion Council launched London Collections: Men, styled LC:M, which included Spring/Summer and Autumn/Winter shows. By June 2015, LC:M had 77 designers showing, a 67% increase since its launch in 2012. The event's name was changed to London Fashion Week Men's for the Autumn/Winter 2017 collections, which launched in January 2017, to better reflect the event's growing consumer focus.

In June 2025, the British Fashion Council moved away from a standalone week of event's for men's fashion, instead launching menswear-focused London show rooms in Paris.

== London Fashion Week Festival ==
Following London Fashion Week each season, the four-day London Fashion Week Festival (LFWF), formerly known as London Fashion Weekend, offers a consumer-orientated fashion week experience.

Held at The Store Studios, 180 The Strand, LFWF allows consumers to shop a curated edit of designer collections at show-exclusive prices, sit front row at catwalk shows by London Fashion Week designers, get a head start on the key trends of the coming season and listen to talks by industry experts.

== See also ==
- Fashion week
- List of fashion events
- BBC Proms – Annual classical music concerts in London
- BFI London Film Festival – Annual event in London, England
- Frieze Art Fair – International contemporary art fair in London
- London Design Festival – Annual arts event in the United Kingdom
