= Beak Street =

Street in Soho, London

Coordinates: 51.5122°N 0.1378°W

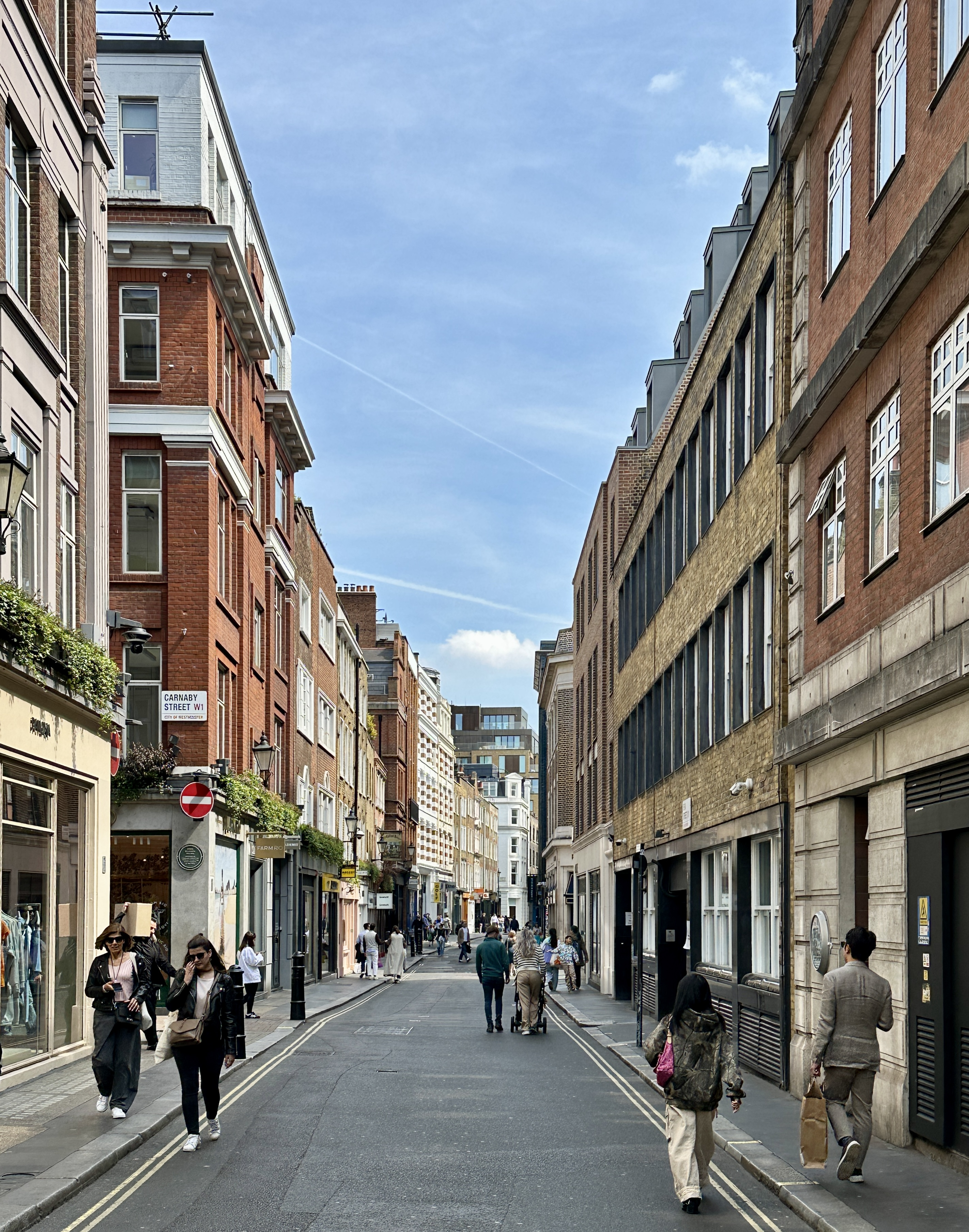
Beak Street in 2026

Beak Street is a street in Soho, London, that runs roughly east–west between Regent Street and Lexington Street.

== Location ==
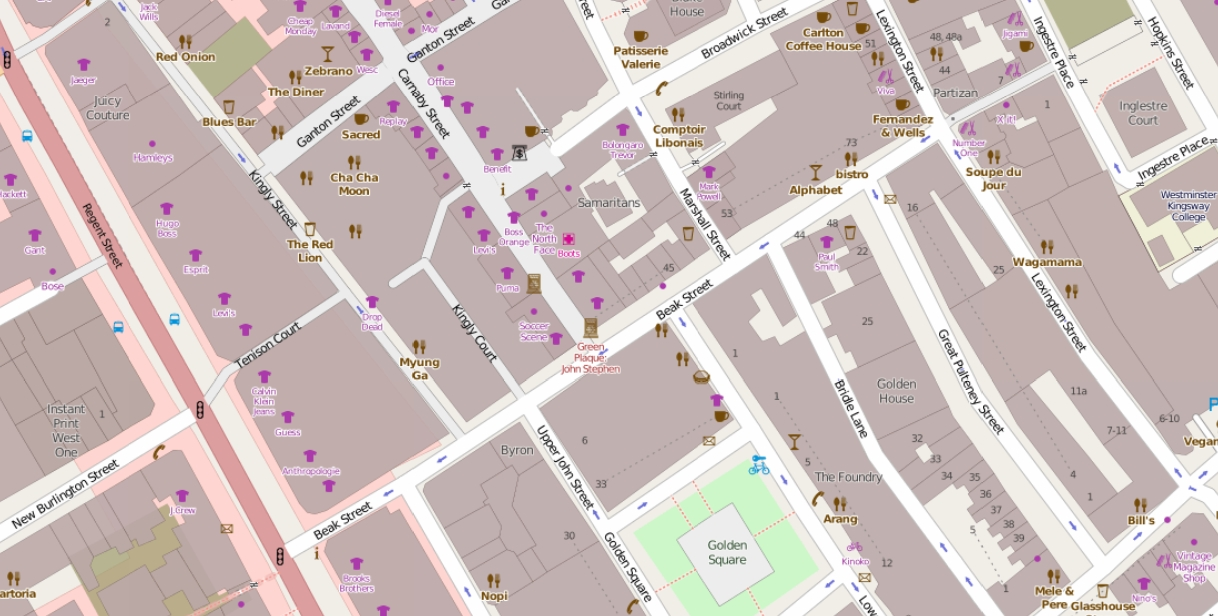
The immediate vicinity of Beak Street

On its south side, Beak Street is joined by Warwick Street, Upper John Street, Upper James Street, Bridle Lane and Great Pulteney Street. On its north side, Beak Street is joined by Kingly Street, Kingly Court, Carnaby Street, and Marshall Street. Beak Street is a one-way street for traffic.

== History ==
The section between Regent and Warwick streets were once part of an ancient city highway that ran from Piccadilly to Oxford Circus.

The street is named after Thomas Beake, later one of the Queen's messengers, who, in the late 17th century, obtained the land on the north side, between Regent and Kingly streets. The name Beak Street first appeared in the ratebooks for 1689, and in 1691 it was ordered that the street be paved with stone.

The remaining section was known as Silver Street until 1883, and was part of Gelding Close until Bridle Lane, where, as Silver Street, it was part of the 'Pulteney estate'.

== Inhabitants ==
The painter Antonio Canaletto lived at number 41 between 1749 and 1752.

Artist's model Betty May, and her husband Raoul Loveday who died at Aleister's Crowley Abbey of Thelema in 1923, lived in Beak Street for a time in 1922 before they went to Sicily.

In 1936, the first classes of the new London Theatre Studio took place in rooms in Beak Street which had once been used as practice rooms by Serge Diaghilev.

== Listed buildings ==
There are a number of listed buildings in Beak Street. Numbers 19, 21, 23, 41 and 43, 73, 77, and 79 are all listed with Historic England.
