= Great Pulteney Street, London =

Street in London, England

Coordinates: 51.512083°N 0.135919°W

View looking north down the street in 2015

Great Pulteney Street is a street in the Soho area of London. It runs from Brewer Street in the south to Beak Street in the north.

== History and description ==
The street was built up during the redevelopment of the Pulteney estate in the early 18th century. It was named for the family which William Pulteney was then at the head of with the "great" used to contrast it with Little Pulteney Street, now the eastern section of Brewer Street. The laying of the street swept away a number of smaller streets alleys and courts that were on the site. It ran a route roughly parallel to Bridle Lane to its west and Lexington Street to its east, although had a slight bend in its route. A number of the houses from the period of rebuilding survive, with most of the remainder replaced by warehouses.

== Former residents ==
- Charles Rainsford, general, No. 16.
- Jacob Kirkman, founder of firm of harpsichord and piano makers, No. 17.
- Joseph Haydn, composer, stayed at No. 18.
- Thomas Sandby, painter and architect, No. 23.
- Francis Fuller, colonel, Robert Melvill, antiquary, No. 25.
- Richard Corbet, politician, Allen McLean, general, No. 26.
- William Oram, painter, No. 27.
- John Clegg, violinist, Michael Christian Festing, musician, Nos. 28–32
- Burkat Shudi, harpsichord maker, James Flemming, lieutenant-general, James Montresor, colonel, Clifton Wintringham, physician, William Roy, colonel, Francisco de Miranda, Venezuelan revolutionary, Nos. 32–35.
- John William Polidori, writer and physician, No. 38.
- Abraham Kirkman, member of the Kirkam family, No. 40.

== See also ==
- Lexington Street
