= National Car Parks =

United Kingdom car park operator

- Type: Private
- Industry: Car parking
- Founded: 3 January 1931
- Founder: Colonel Frederick Lucas
- Headquarters: London, England
- Number of locations: 340 (March 2026)
- Area served: United Kingdom
- Revenue: £187 million (2023)
- Net income: £11 million (2023)
- Number of employees: 682 (2026)
- Parent: Martin Property Group
- Website: ncp.co.uk

National Car Parks (NCP) is a British car park operator. Founded in 1931, it manages off-street car parks in towns and cities, including sites at airports, hospitals and National Rail stations. In March 2026 it entered voluntary administration.

== History ==
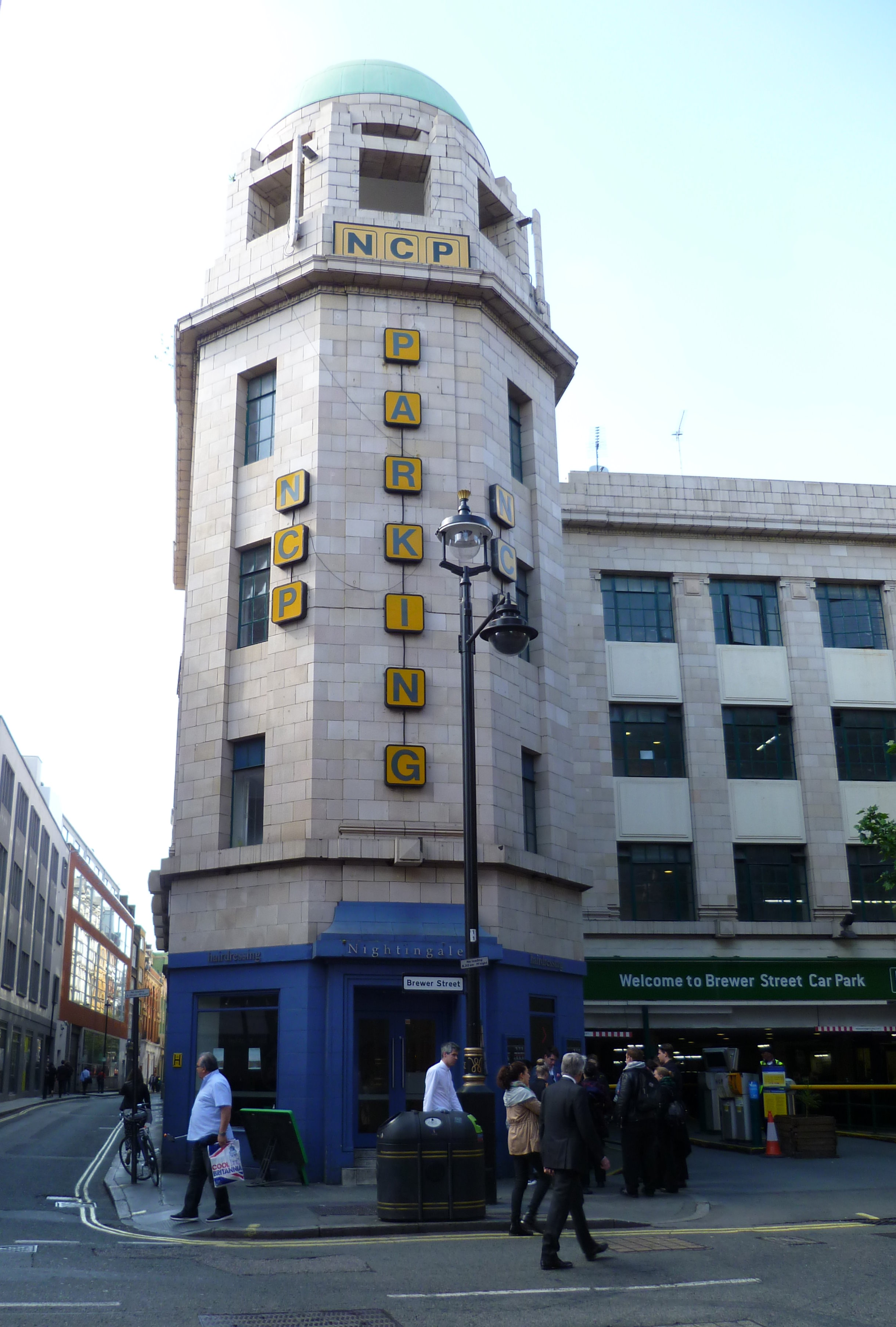
NCP car park in Brewer Street, London

NCP was incorporated in 1931 and is commonly traced to its founder, Colonel Frederick Lucas. It expanded after being acquired in 1959 by Central Car Parks, a business formed by Ronald Hobson and Donald Gosling, who developed car parks on vacant sites in Central London after World War II.

In 1993 NCP chief executive Gordon Layton was acquitted in an Old Bailey trial following allegations of industrial espionage against rival company Europarks.

In 1998 NCP was sold to the US company Cendant for £801 million. In 2005 it was acquired by 3i for £555 million. In 2007, 3i sold NCP's off-street parking business to a fund managed by Macquarie Group for £790 million. In 2017 Macquarie sold NCP to a consortium of Park24 and the Development Bank of Japan.

Part of an NCP-operated multi-storey car park in Nottingham collapsed on 19 August 2017, leaving vehicles hanging over the edge of the building; no injuries were reported.

In March 2026 NCP entered voluntary administration with PwC appointed as administrator while the business continued to trade. By May 2026 29 sites had closed. In October 2026, NCP was saved by Northern Ireland property company Martin Property Group, including 93 out of 340 locations, 52 other car parks owned by Martin Property Group would be converted to the NCP brand.

== Operations ==
NCP operates off-street car parks across the United Kingdom, including locations in town and city centres and at major transport hubs.

NCP previously operated a portfolio of Transport for London station car parks; the contract was awarded to Saba with effect from January 2023.

In November 2005 NCP began operating bus routes 33 and 419 through its NCP Challenger subsidiary under contract to Transport for London. It later operated routes 272, 283, 440 and E11.
