= Fiddle City =

1981 novel by Dan Kavanagh

- First edition
- Author: Dan Kavanagh (pseudonym of Julian Barnes)
- Language: English
- Publisher: Jonathan Cape
- Publication date: 1 Oct 1981
- Publication place: United Kingdom
- Media type: Print
- Pages: 176
- ISBN: 0-224-01977-5
- Preceded by: Duffy
- Followed by: Putting the Boot In

Fiddle City is a novel by Julian Barnes writing under the pseudonym of Dan Kavanagh. It is the second of a four-novel series featuring Duffy, a bisexual private detective with a 'phobia of ticking watches and a penchant for Tupperware'. Originally published by Jonathan Cape in 1981, it was republished by Orion books in 2014.

== Plot introduction ==
Heathrow Airport has the nickname of Fiddle City, but for Roy Kendrick who runs a transport business out of the airport, petty thievery has got out of hand as a number of shipments have gone astray and he employs Duffy to investigate. Conveniently McKay, one of Kendrick's employees has recently had a near-fatal car crash on the M4 and Duffy steps into his shoes and works undercover in Kendrick's warehouse. Duffy feels himself being watched by Mrs Boseley the dour HR manager as he uncovers evidence of cocaine smuggling.

== Reception ==
David Montrose found the novel less impressive than Duffy, though interesting in some ways. Richard Brown praised the way in which Fiddle City provides 'vivid low-life detail'.
