= Duffy (novel) =

Novel by Julian Barnes

- First edition
- Author: Dan Kavanagh (pseudonym of Julian Barnes)
- Language: English
- Publisher: Jonathan Cape
- Publication date: 3 Jul 1980
- Publication place: United Kingdom
- Media type: Print
- Pages: 181
- ISBN: 0-224-01822-1
- Followed by: Fiddle City

Duffy is a novel by Julian Barnes writing under the pseudonym of Dan Kavanagh. Barnes published the novel the year after he married the literary agent Pat Kavanagh, to whom he dedicated the book. It is the first of a four-novel series featuring the title character Duffy, a bisexual private detective and ex-policeman with a 'phobia of ticking watches and a penchant for Tupperware'. Originally published by Jonathan Cape in 1980, it was republished by Orion books in 2014.

== Plot introduction ==
In the quiet Surrey village of West Byfleet two masked men break into Brian McKechnie's house, cut his wife and spit roast his cat. This leads to blackmail and McKechnie goes to the local police but finds them strangely uninterested and so he hires Duffy to investigate. The investigator uses his contacts in the seedy Soho underworld to identify those responsible and finds they have links to his ex-colleagues in the police and to his own dismissal from their ranks four years earlier after being set-up for underage homosexual sex.

== Reception ==
John Sutherland in the London Review of Books writes, "Duffy’s principal attraction is a kind of voyeurism on voyeurism, as the hero investigates the square mile’s ‘saunas’, peepshows and sex shops. The report which the novel offers as to what goes on in these establishments is given in a callously brutal and tasteless rhetoric"
