= Brewer Street =

Street in Soho

Coordinates: 51°30′41.5″N 0°8′8″W

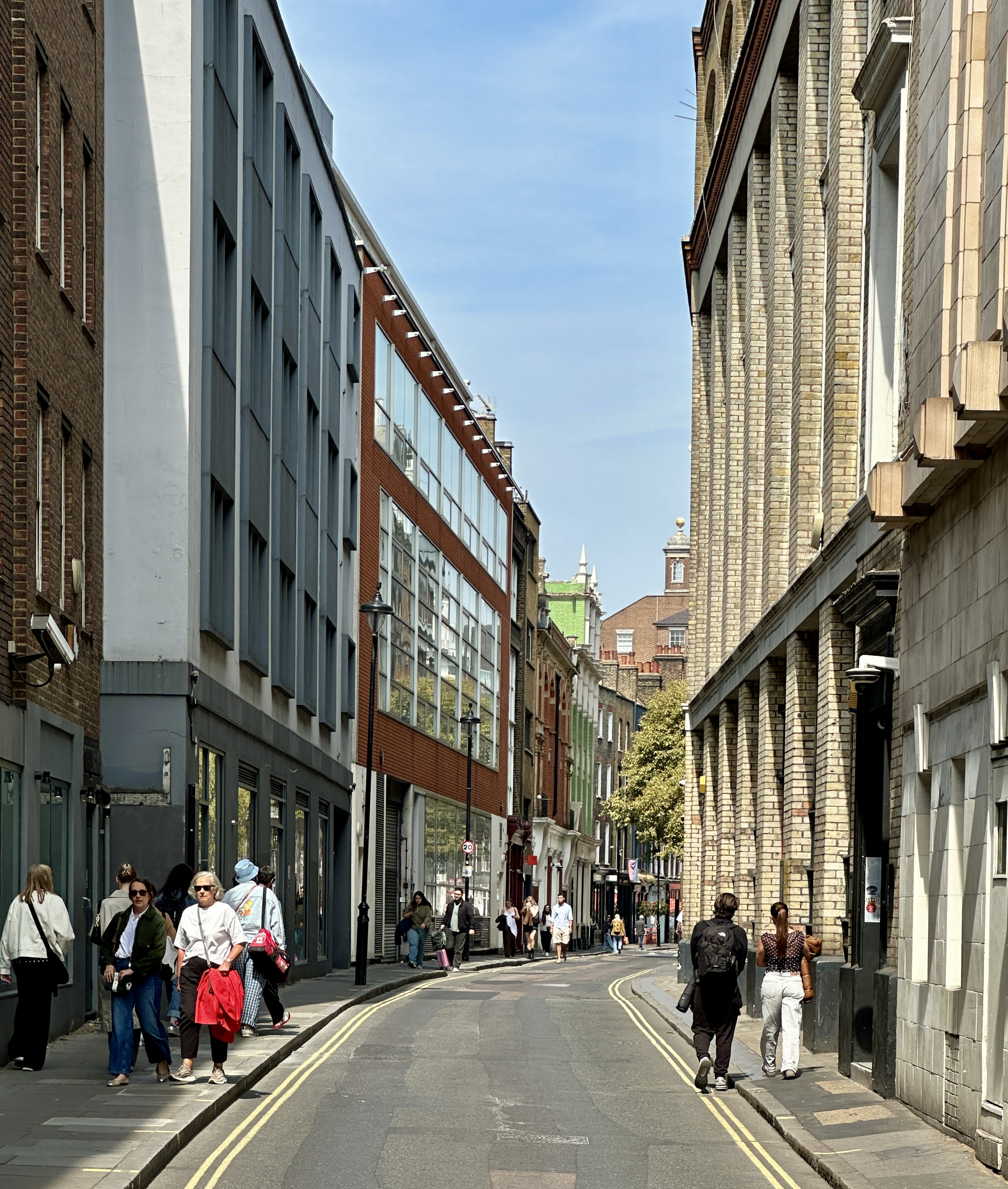
Brewer Street in 2026

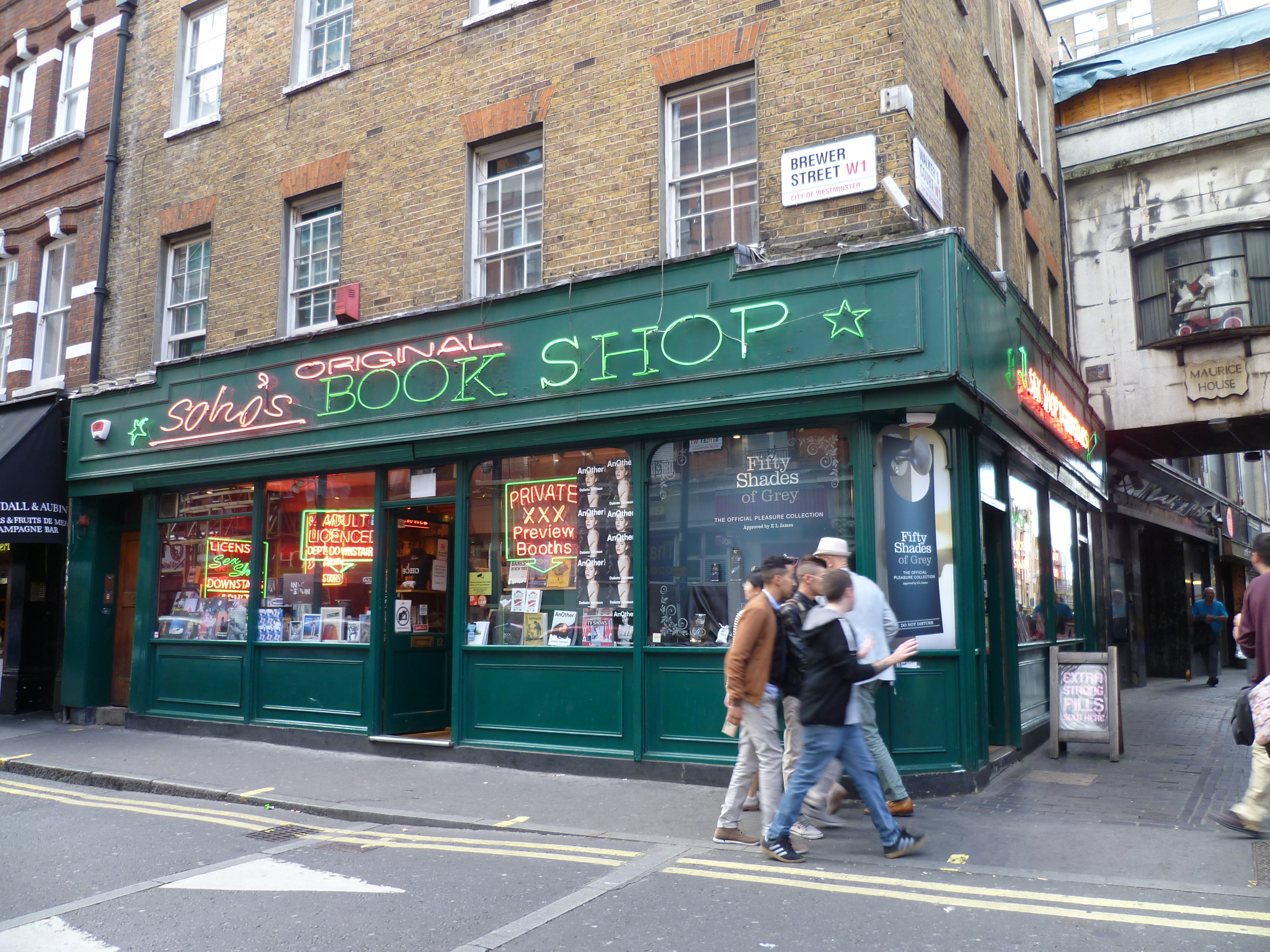
Soho's Book Shop on Brewer Street

Brewer Street is a street in the Soho area of central London, running for about 350 metres west to east from Glasshouse Street to Wardour Street.

The street was developed in the late 17th century by the landowner Sir William Pulteney. It first appears on a map of 1664, and was built up over the following decades from east to west. The street is named after two breweries, Ayres's and Davis's (both demolished), which stood from 1674 at the eastern end of the street then known as Knaves' Acre. This part of the street was later called Little Pulteney Street until renamed Brewer Street in 1937. The buildings on the south side between Rupert Street and Great Windmill Street (odd numbers) are from 1883 to 1885. The scheme was planned by architect, Arthur Cates to include shops at ground level with artisan dwellings above. The four and five-storey red brick buildings were designed by Robert Sawyer. One section's facade has been replaced because of World War II bomb damage. Prior to the 1880s rebuilding the site consisted of courts and alleys. Walker's Court, opposite Rupert Street is a remnant of the old layout.

On the north side at Lexington Street is a Grade II listed multi-storey Brewer Street Car Park operated by National Car Parks. It was opened in 1929 as Lex Garage and is one of the oldest surviving car parks of its type in England. It has a Classical-Moderne style front elevation.

The street is now known for its variety of shops and entertainment establishments typical of Soho.

The street crosses, or meets with, Wardour Street, Rupert Street, Walker's Court, Greens Court, Lexington Street, Great Pulteney Street, Bridle Lane, Sherwood Street, Lower James Street, Lower John Street and Air Street, before meeting with Glasshouse Street at its western end.
