= Lexington Street, London =

Street in London, England

Coordinates: 51.512520°N 0.135762°W

Northern end of Lexington Street

Lexington Street is a street in the Soho area of London. It runs from Brewer Street in the south to Broadwick Street in the north.

== History and description ==
Building on the street began in the 1670s, with the southern section going up first with buildings by Henry Davis's brewhouse. This section was first named Walker's Court, although it would come to be known as Little Windmill Street, as opposed to Great Windmill Street and the northern section as Cambridge Street. Both sections were given the current single name in 1885 for Robert Sutton, Baron Lexinton (sic) whose title was inherited by the Pulteney family.

The early 18th century saw much of the broader Pulteney estate redeveloped and the streets buildings were nearly entirely replaced. Most of the current streets buildings are Victorian and Edwardian warehouses, with surviving early Georgian houses, now with shops, of architectural note in the northern part. Also at the northern end is the John Snow public house.

== See also ==
- Great Pulteney Street
