= Soho =

District in London, England

Coordinates: 51°30′46″N 0°7′52″W

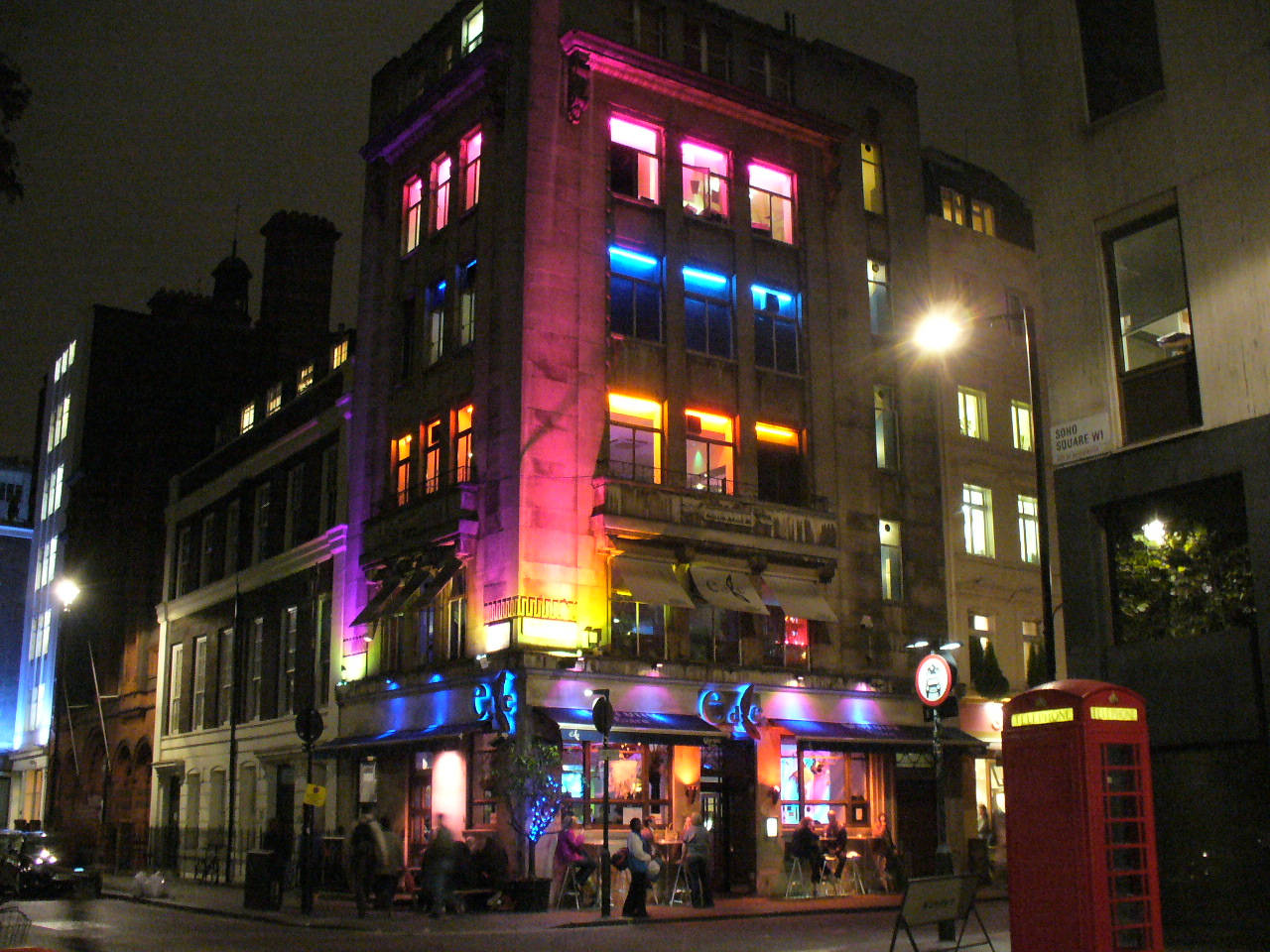
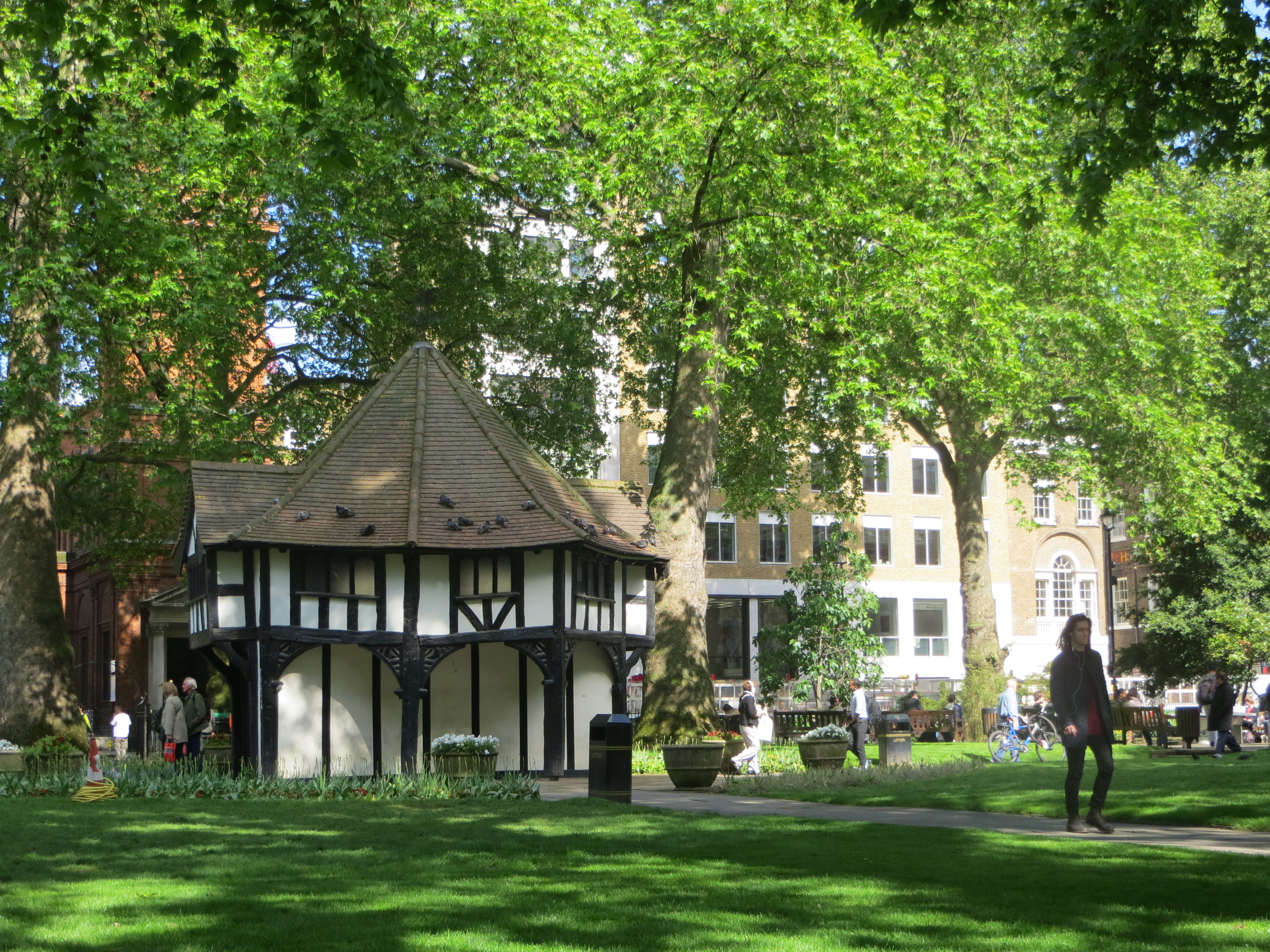
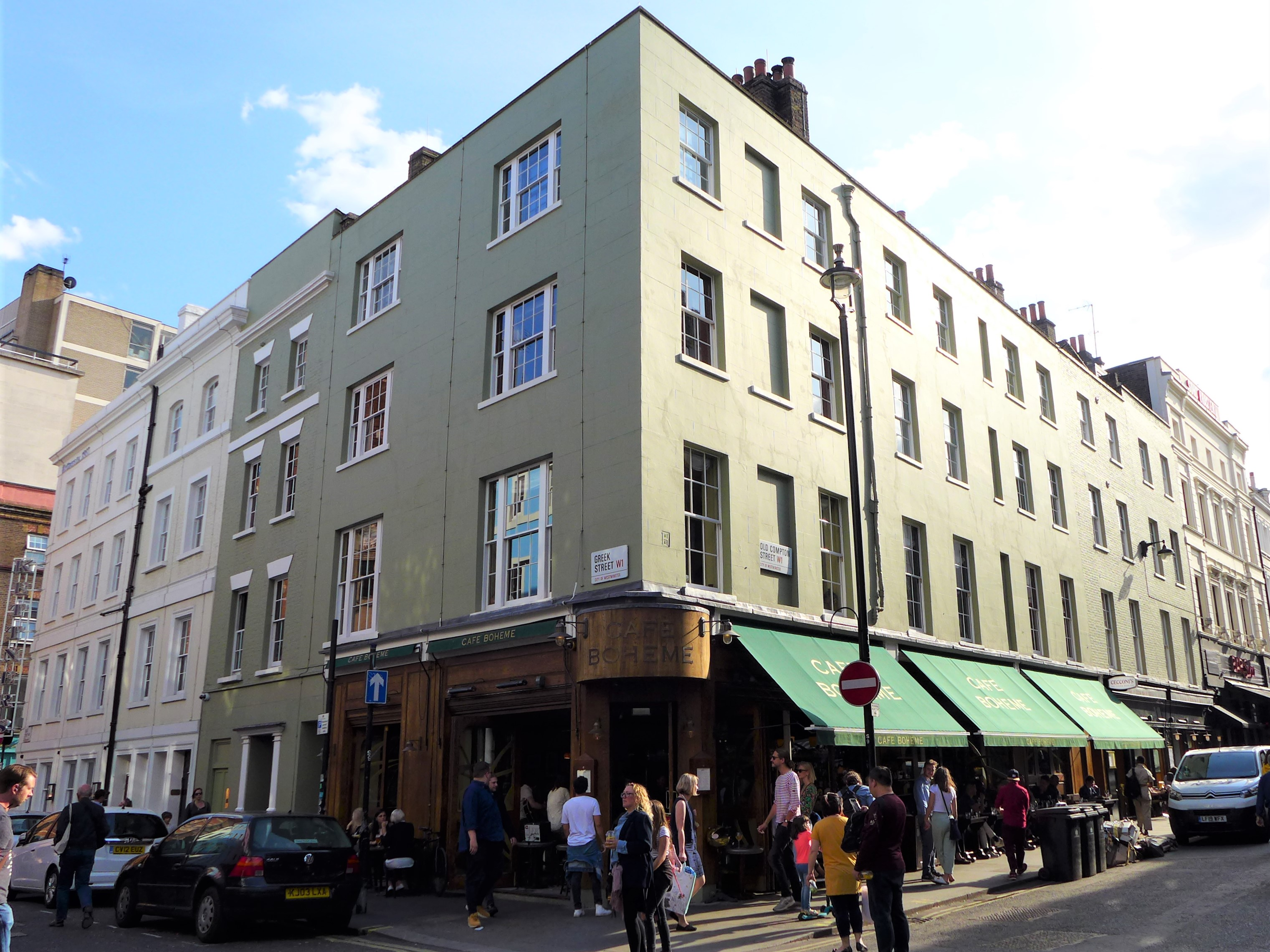
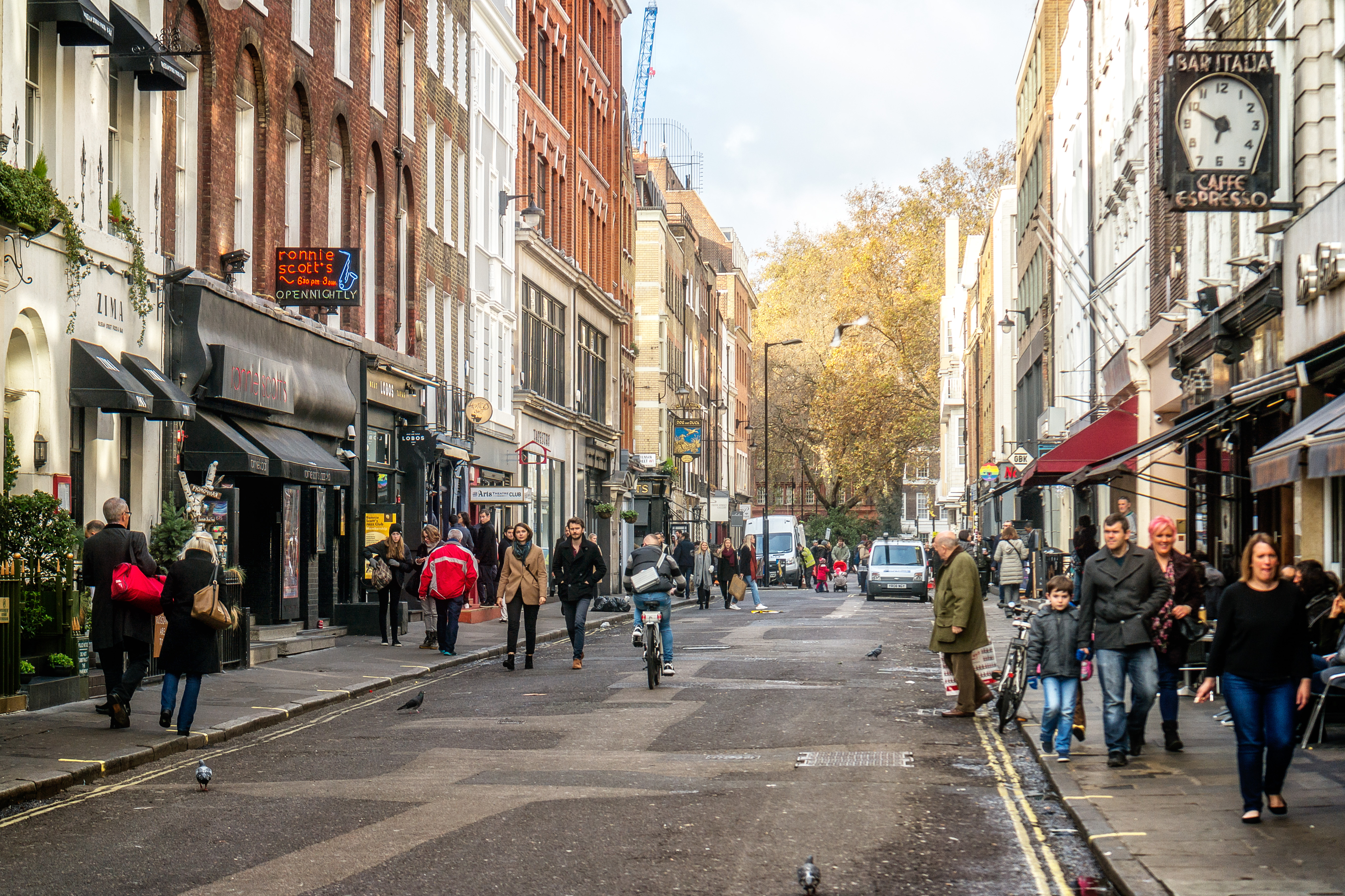
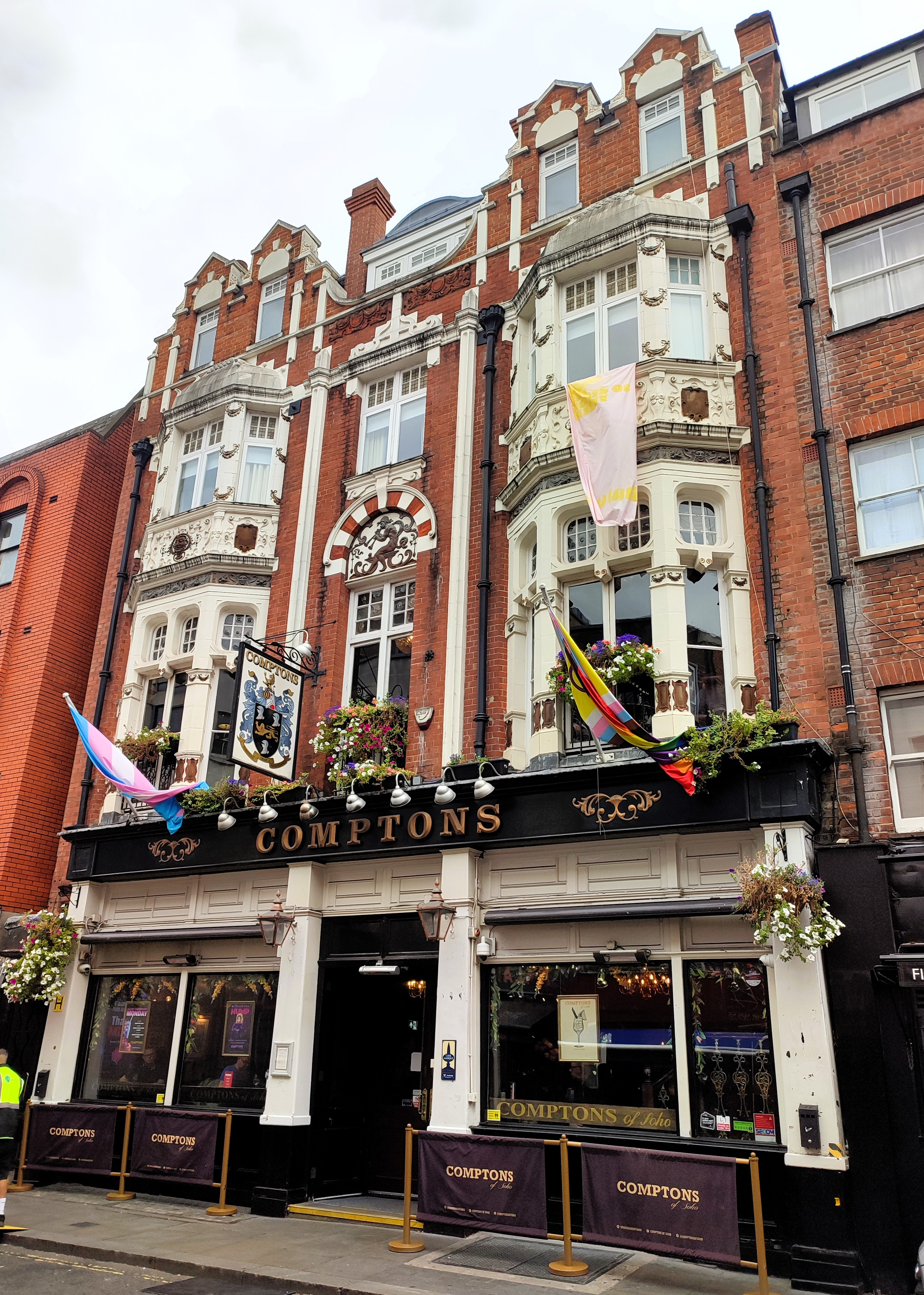
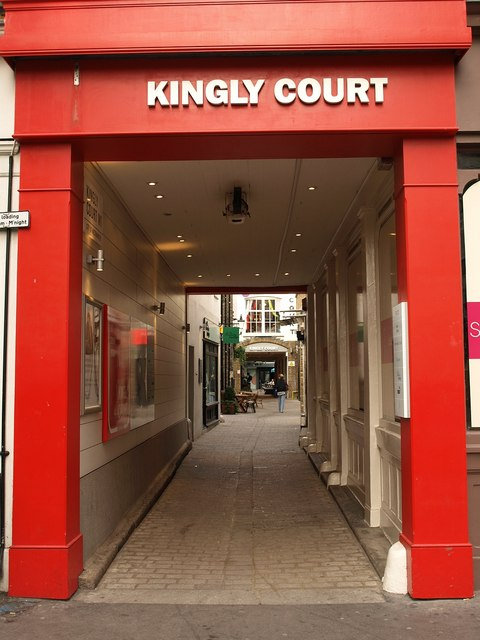
- Bar in Soho Gardeners Hut, Soho Square Greek Street Ronnie Scott's Jazz Club Compton's, Soho Kingly Court

- Location within Greater London
- Population: 2,600
- OS grid reference: TQ294810
- London borough: Westminster
- Ceremonial county: Greater London
- Region: London
- Country: England
- Sovereign state: United Kingdom
- Post town: London
- Postcode district: W1
- Dialling code: 020
- Police: Metropolitan
- Fire: London
- Ambulance: London
- UK Parliament: Cities of London and Westminster
- London Assembly: West Central

Soho is a district of Westminster, in the City of Westminster in the West End of London. Originally a fashionable district for the aristocracy, it has been one of the main entertainment districts in the capital since the 19th century.

The area was developed from farmland by Henry VIII in 1536, when it became a royal park. It became a parish in its own right in the late 17th century, when buildings started to be developed for the upper class, including the laying out of Soho Square in the 1680s. St Anne's Church was established during the late 17th century, and remains a significant local landmark; other churches are the Church of Our Lady of the Assumption and St Gregory and St Patrick's Church in Soho Square. The aristocracy had mostly moved away by the mid-19th century, when Soho was particularly badly hit by an outbreak of cholera in 1854. For much of the 20th century Soho had a reputation as a base for the sex industry in addition to its night life and its location for the headquarters of leading film companies. Since the 1980s, the area has undergone considerable gentrification. It is now predominantly a fashionable district of upmarket restaurants and media offices, with only a small remnant of sex industry venues. London's most prominent gay village is centred on Old Compton Street in Soho.

Soho's reputation as a major entertainment district of London stems from theatres such as the Windmill Theatre on Great Windmill Street and the Raymond Revuebar owned by entrepreneur Paul Raymond, and music clubs such as the 2i's Coffee Bar and the Marquee Club. Trident Studios was based in Soho, and the nearby Denmark Street has hosted numerous music publishing houses and instrument shops from the 20th century onwards. The independent British film industry centres on Soho, including the British headquarters of Twentieth Century Fox and the British Board of Film Classification offices. The area has been popular for restaurants since the 19th century, including the long-standing Kettner's which was visited by numerous celebrities. Near to Soho is London's Chinatown, centred on Gerrard Street and containing several restaurants and shops.

== Name ==
The name "Soho" first appears around 1636. The name is derived from a former hunting cry. James Scott, 1st Duke of Monmouth, used "soho" as a rallying call for his men at the Battle of Sedgemoor on 6 July 1685, half a century after the name was first used for this area of London.

The Soho name has been reused by other entertainment and restaurant districts such as SoHo, Hong Kong, which derives its name from being located south of Hollywood Road, and the cultural and commercial area of Soho in Málaga, Spain. The New York City neighbourhood of SoHo, Manhattan, gets its name from its location south of Houston Street, but is also a reference to London's Soho. The Pittsburgh neighbourhood of Uptown was also formerly called Soho, most likely having been named by its founder James Tustin after the London district, though it may refer to Soho, West Midlands.

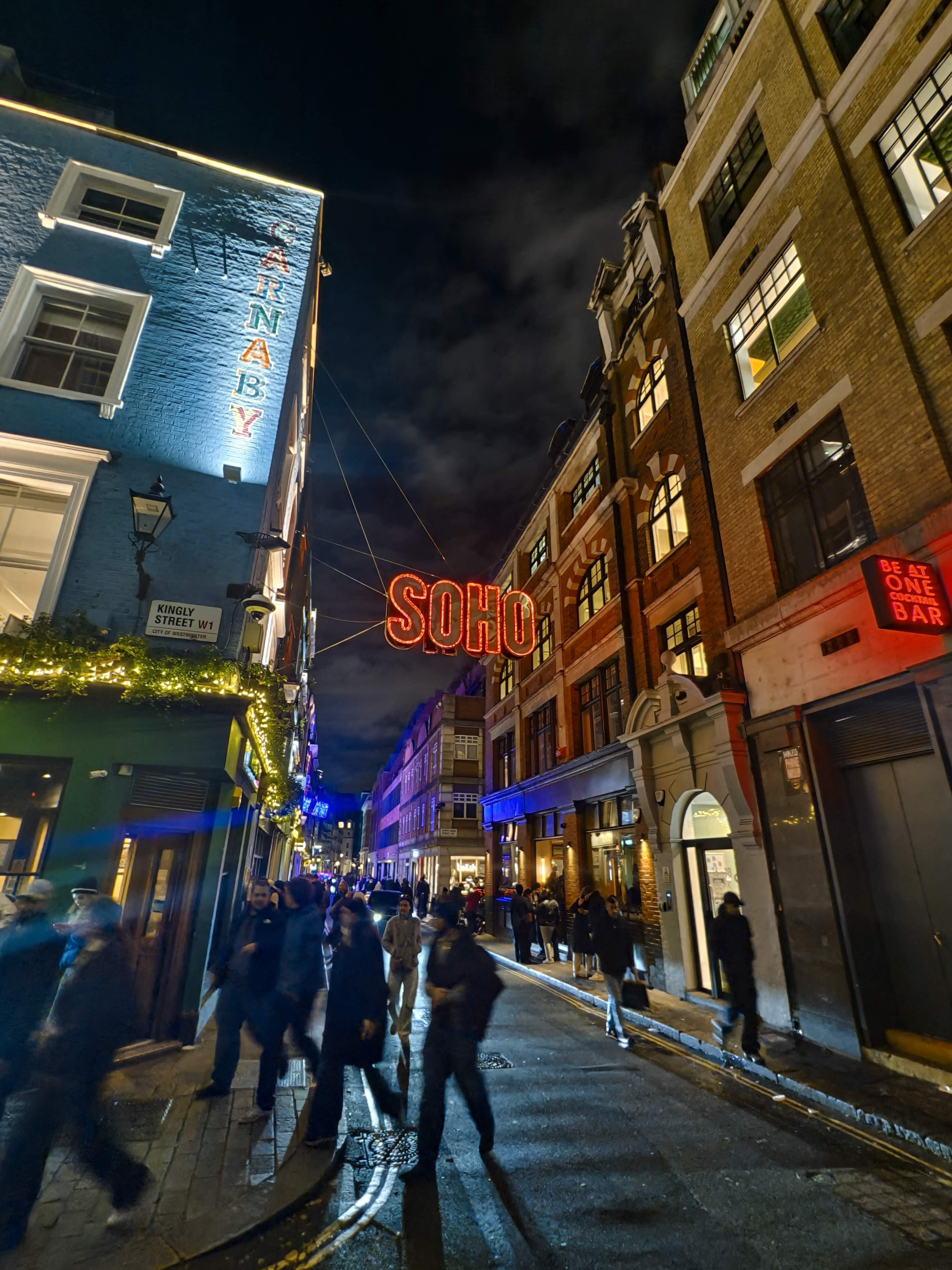
The neon SOHO sign at the intersection of Beak and Kingly Streets, London, UK

== Location ==
Map of Soho

Soho has never been an administrative unit with formally defined boundaries; it is about 1/4 square mile (0.65 km^{2}) in area, and is usually considered to be bounded by Shaftesbury Avenue to the south, Oxford Street to the north, Regent Street to the west, and Charing Cross Road to the east. Apart from Oxford Street, all of these roads are 19th-century metropolitan improvements. The area to the west is known as Mayfair, to the north Fitzrovia, to the east St Giles and Covent Garden, and to the south St James's. Soho is part of the West End electoral ward which elects three councillors to Westminster City Council.

The nearest London Underground stations are Oxford Circus, Piccadilly Circus, Tottenham Court Road, Leicester Square and Covent Garden.

== History ==
=== Early history ===
During the Middle Ages, the area that is now Soho was farmland that belonged to the Abbot and Convent of Abingdon and the master of Burton St Lazar Hospital in Leicestershire, who managed a leper hospital in St Giles in the Fields. In 1536, the land was taken by Henry VIII as a royal park for the Palace of Whitehall. The area south of what is now Shaftesbury Avenue did not stay in the Crown possession for long; Queen Mary sold around 7 acres (2.8 ha) in 1554, and most of the remainder was sold between 1590 and 1623. A small 2-acre (0.81 ha) section of land remained, until sold by Charles II in 1676.

In the 1660s, ownership of Soho Fields passed to Henry Jermyn, 1st Earl of St Albans, who leased 19 out of the 22 acres (89,000 m^{2}) of land to Joseph Girle. He was granted permission to develop property and quickly passed the lease and development to bricklayer Richard Frith. Much of the land was granted freehold in 1698 by William III to William Bentinck, 1st Earl of Portland, while the southern part of Soho was sold piecemeal in the 16th and 17th centuries, partly to Robert Sidney, Earl of Leicester.

Soho was part of the ancient parish of St Martin in the Fields, forming part of the Liberty of Westminster. As the population started to grow, a new church was provided, and in 1687 a new parish of St Anne was established for it. The parish stretched from Oxford Street in the north to Leicester Square in the south and from what is now Charing Cross Road in the east to Wardour Street in the west; it therefore included all of contemporary eastern Soho, including the Chinatown area. The western portion of modern Soho, around Carnaby Street, was part of the parish of St James, which was split off from St Martin in 1686.

=== Gentrification ===
Building progressed rapidly in the late 17th century, with large properties such as Monmouth House (built for James Scott, 1st Duke of Monmouth, Charles II's eldest illegitimate son), Leicester House, Fauconberg House, Carlisle House and Newport House.

Soho Square was first laid out in the 1680s on the former Soho Fields; by 1691, 41 houses had been completed there. It was originally called King Square in honour of Charles II, and a statue of him was based in the centre. Several upper-class families moved into the area, including those of Richard Graham, 1st Viscount Preston, and Edward Howard, 2nd Earl of Carlisle. The square had become known as Soho Square by 1720, at which point it had fashionable houses on all sides. Only No 10 and No 15 from this period have survived into the 21st century.

Though the Earls of Leicester and Portland had intended Soho to be an upper-class estate comparable to Bloomsbury, Marylebone and Mayfair, it never developed as such. Immigrants began to settle in the area from around 1680 onwards, particularly French Huguenots after 1688. The area became known as London's French quarter. The French church in Soho Square was founded by Huguenots and opened on 25 March 1893, with a façade of terracotta and coloured brick designed by Aston Webb.

=== Cholera outbreak ===
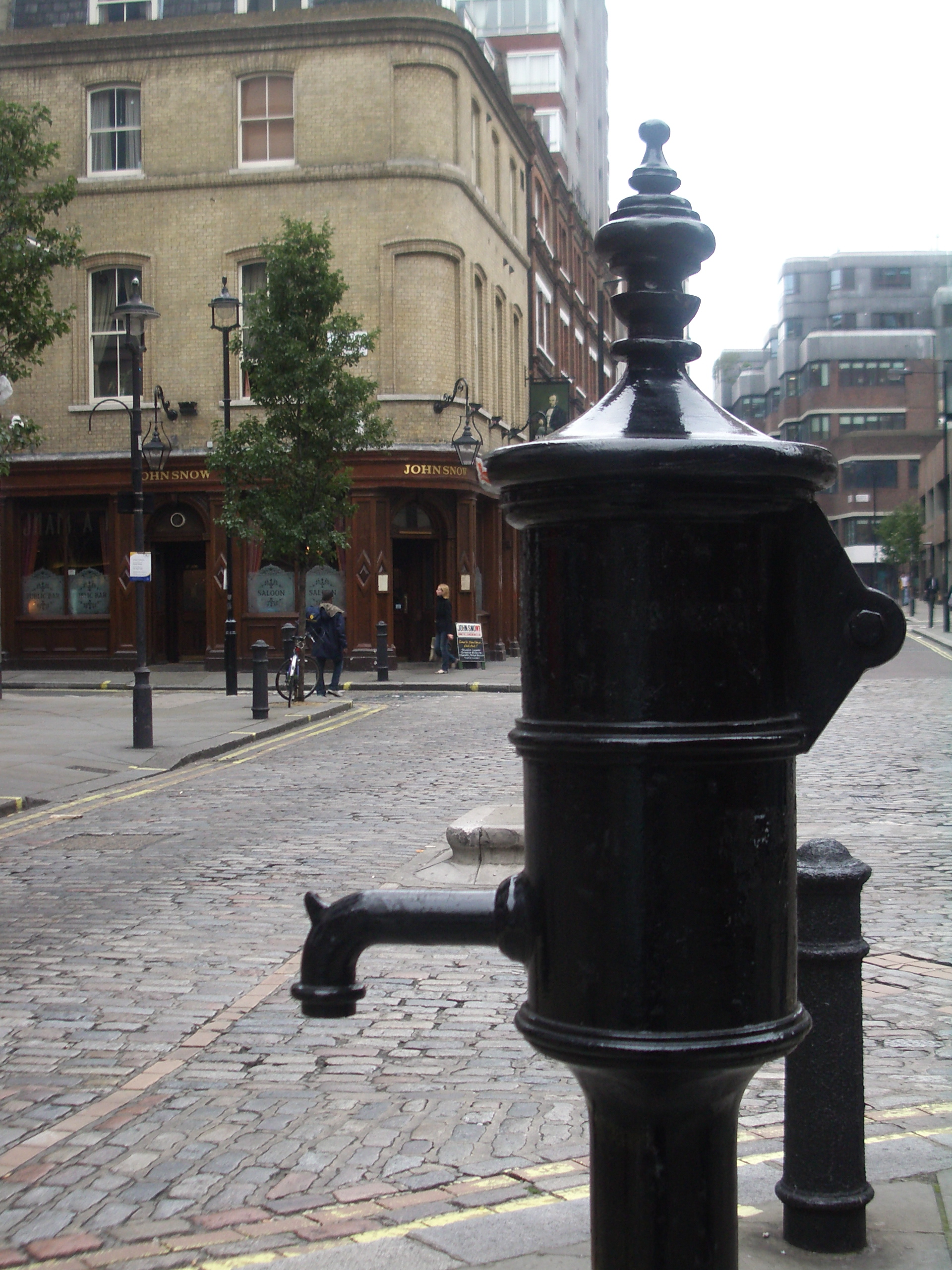
John Snow memorial, with the pub shown in the background

A significant event in the history of epidemiology and public health was John Snow's study of an 1854 outbreak of cholera in Soho. He identified the cause of the outbreak as water from the public pump at the junction of Broad Street (now Broadwick Street) and Cambridge Street (now Lexington Street), close to the rear wall of what is today the John Snow public house.

Snow mapped the addresses of the sick and noted that they were mostly people whose nearest access to water was the Broad Street pump. He persuaded the authorities to remove the handle of the pump, thus preventing any more of the infected water from being collected. The spring below the pump was later found to have been contaminated with sewage. This is an early example of epidemiology, public health medicine and the application of science—the germ theory of disease—in a real-life crisis. Science writer Steven Johnson has written about the changes related to the cholera outbreak, and notes that almost every building on the street that existed in 1854 has since been replaced. A replica of the pump, with a memorial plaque and without a handle (to signify Snow's action to halt the outbreak) was erected in 1992 near the location of the original.

=== Decline ===
By the mid-18th century, the aristocrats who had been living in Soho Square or Gerrard Street had moved away, as more fashionable areas such as Mayfair became available. The historian and topographer William Maitland wrote that the parish "so greatly abound with French that is an easy Matter for a Stranger to imagine himself in France." Soho's character stems partly from the ensuing neglect by rich and fashionable London, and the lack of the redevelopment that characterised the neighbouring areas.

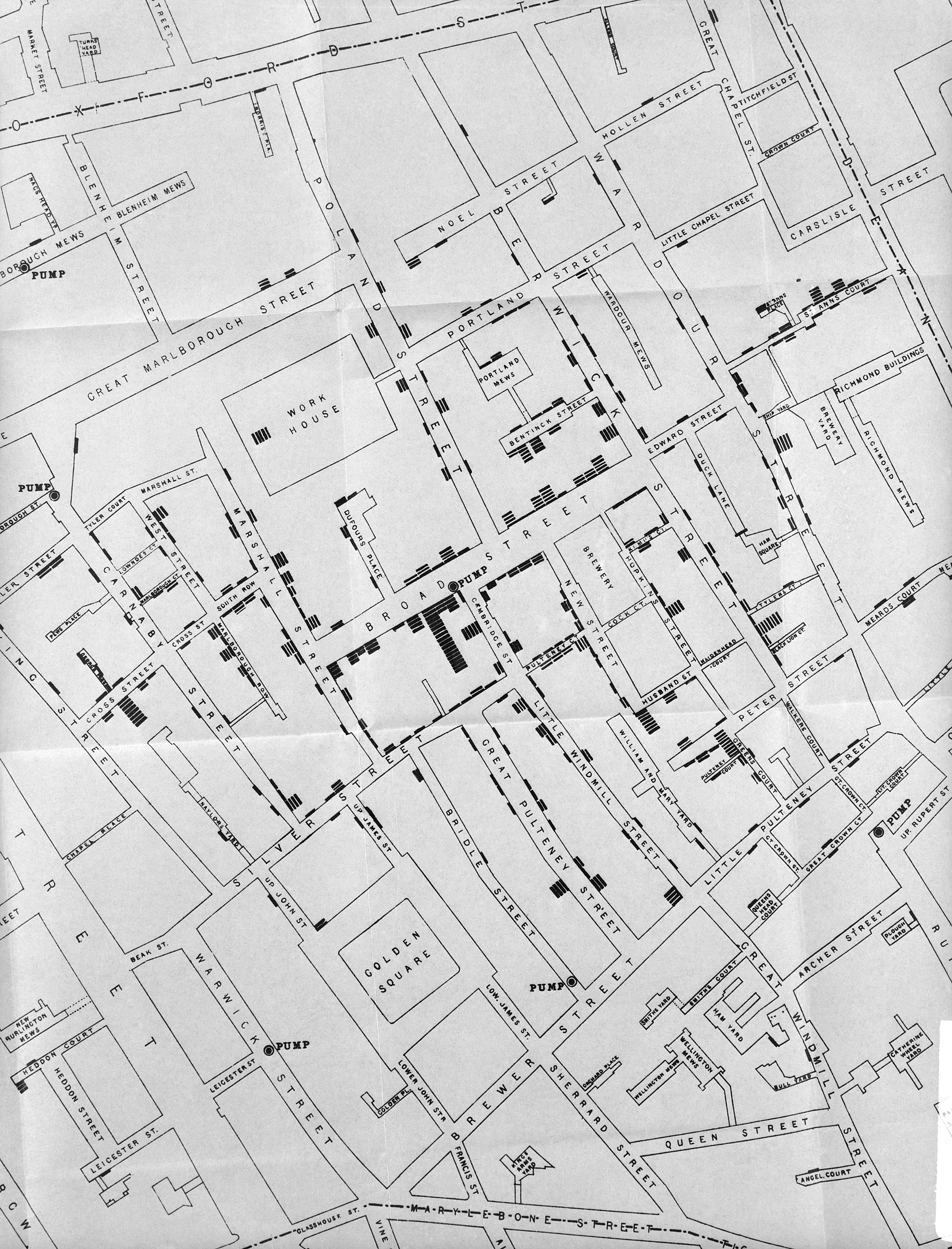
Map showing cholera deaths around Soho in 1854

The aristocracy had mostly disappeared from Soho by the 19th century, to be replaced by prostitutes, music halls and small theatres. The population increased significantly, reaching 327 inhabitants per acre by 1851, making the area one of the most densely populated areas of London. Houses became divided into tenements with chronic overcrowding and disease. The 1854 cholera outbreak caused the remaining upper-class families to leave the area. Numerous hospitals were built to cope with the health problem; six were constructed between 1851 and 1874. Businesses catering to household essentials were established at the same time.

The restaurant trade in Soho improved dramatically in the early 20th century. The construction of new theatres along Shaftesbury Avenue and Charing Cross Road improved the reputation of the area, and a meal for theatre-goers became common. Public houses in Soho increased in popularity during the 1930s and were frequented by struggling authors, poets and artists.

=== Recent history ===
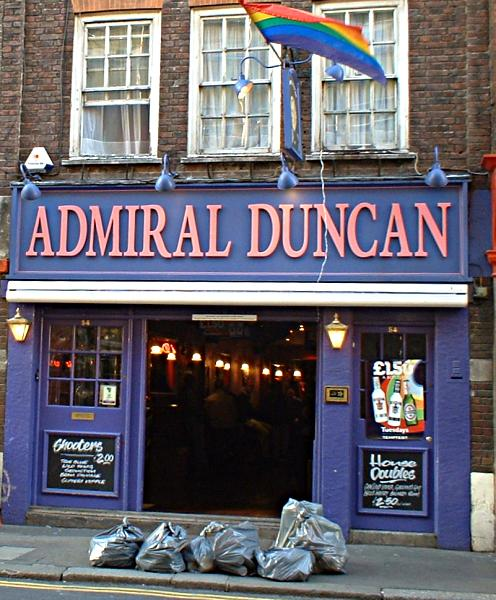
The Admiral Duncan pub, Soho landmark and site of the Soho nail-bombing

Since the decline of the sex industry in Soho in the 1980s and 1990s, the area has returned to being more residential. The Soho Housing Association was established in 1976 to provide reasonable rented accommodation. By the 21st century, it had acquired around 400 flats. St Anne's Church in Dean Street was refurbished after decades of neglect, and a Museum of Soho was established.

On 30 April 1999, the Admiral Duncan pub on Old Compton Street, which serves the gay community, was damaged by a nail bomb that left three dead and 30 injured. The bomb was the third that had been planted by David Copeland, a neo-Nazi who was attempting to stir up ethnic and homophobic tensions by carrying out a series of bombings.

In early February 2020, parts of an unexploded Second World War bomb was discovered by construction workers developing a new mixed residential building in Richmond Mews, near Dean Street. Residents, employees, and pedestrians on Richmond Mews, Dean Street, Meard Street and St Anne's Court were evacuated on both the 3 and 4 February 2020. All road junctions connecting to the streets closed during retrieval of the bomb fragments as well.

== Properties ==
=== Theatre and film ===
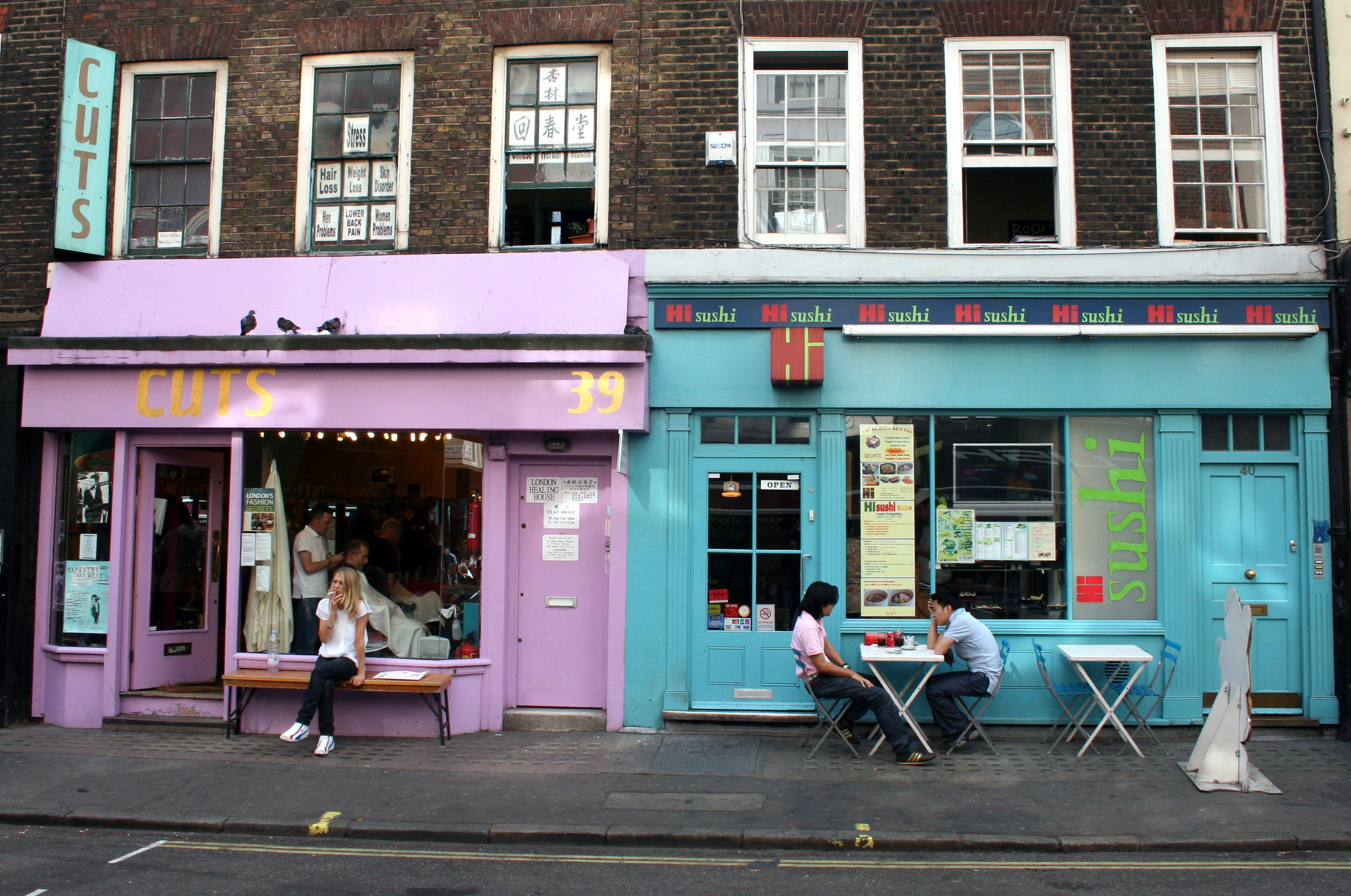
Colourful shop windows in a typical Soho backstreet in London

Soho is near the heart of London's theatre area. It is home to the Soho Theatre, built in 2000 to present new plays and comedy.

The Windmill Theatre was based on Great Windmill Street, and was named after a windmill at this location that was demolished in the 18th century. It initially opened as the Palais de Luxe in 1910 as a small cinema, but was unable to compete with larger venues and was converted into a theatre by Howard Jones. It re-opened in December 1931, but was still unsuccessful. In 1932, the general manager Vivian Van Damm introduced a non-stop variety show throughout the afternoon and evening. It was famous for its nude tableaux vivants, in which the models had to remain motionless to avoid the censorship laws then in place. The theatre claimed that, aside from a compulsory closure between 4 and 16 September 1939, it was the only theatre in London which did not close during the Second World War; this led it to use the slogan "We never closed". Several prominent comedians including Harry Secombe, Jimmy Edwards and Tony Hancock began their careers at the Windmill. It closed on 31 October 1964 and was again turned into a cinema.

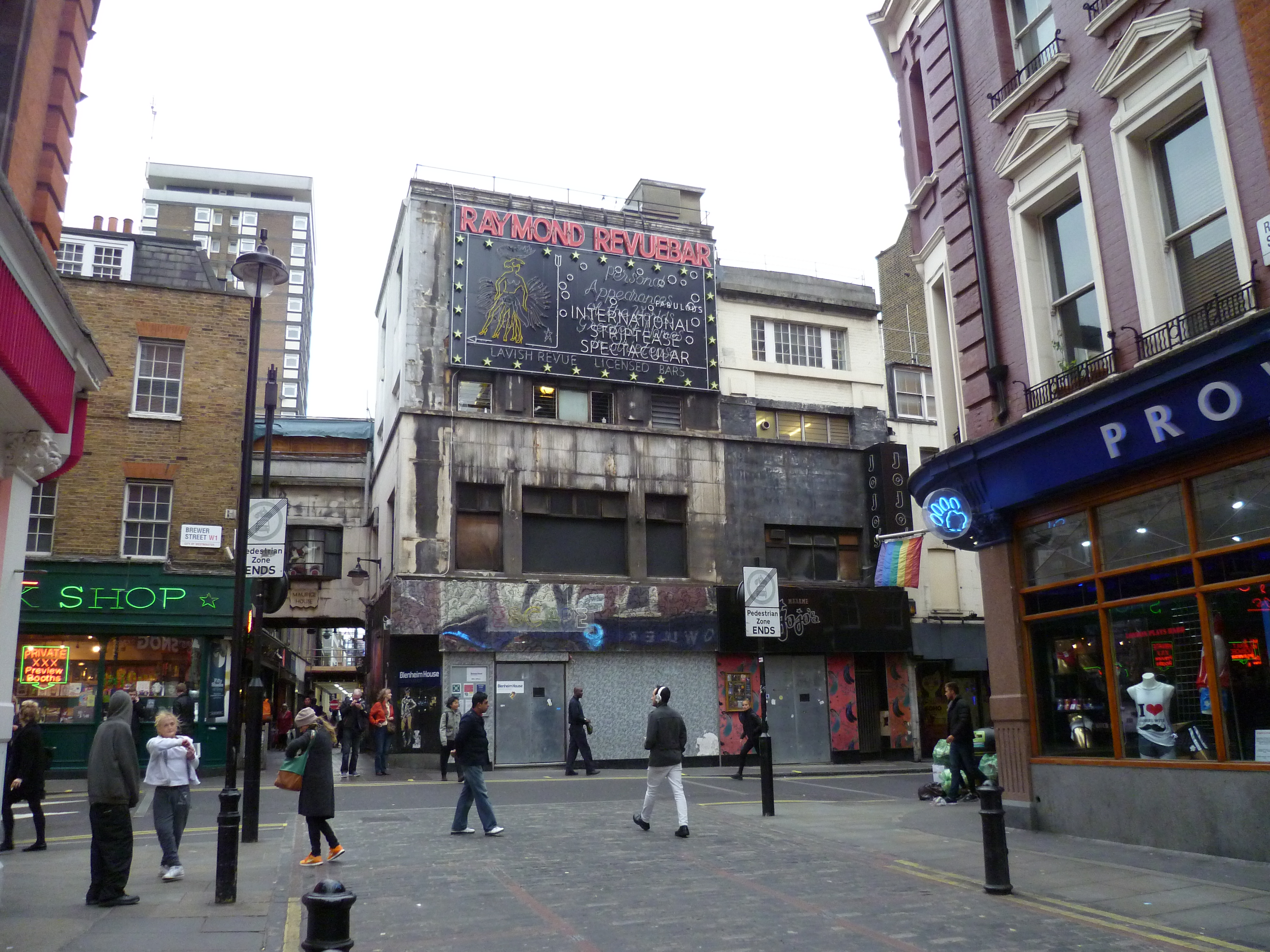
Façade of the Raymond Revuebar in 2015

The Raymond Revuebar at No. 11 Walker's Court was a small theatre specialising in striptease and nude dancing. It was owned by Paul Raymond and opened in 1958. The facade supported a brightly lit sign declaring it to be the "World Centre of Erotic Entertainment". Raymond subsequently bought the lease of the Windmill and ran it as a "nude entertainment" venue until 1981. The upstairs became known as the Boulevard Theatre and in 1980 was adopted as a comedy club called "The Comic Strip" by a small group of alternative comedians including Rik Mayall, Dawn French, Jennifer Saunders, Alexei Sayle and Adrian Edmondson, before they found wider recognition with the series The Comic Strip Presents on Channel 4. The name and control of the theatre (but not the property itself) were bought by Raymond's business associate Gérard Simi in 1996. The theatre suffered financial difficulties owing to increasing rent, leading to its closure in 2004. It became a gay bar and cabaret venue called Too2Much; in 2005, Elton John staged a joint bachelor party there with his longtime partner David Furnish in anticipation of their civil partnership. The venue was subsequently renamed to the Soho Revue Bar, but closed in 2009.

Soho is a centre of the independent film and video industry as well as the television and film post-production industry. Audio post duo White Lightning (Robbie Weston and Rick Dzendzera) opened two audio post-production facilities in different parts of Soho between 1978 and 1987: Silk Sound at 13 Berwick Street, and The Bridge Facilities at 55-57 Great Marlborough Street. Silk Sound was acquired by Bubble TV in 2010, and was rebranded under Bubble's banner in 2018, while The Bridge went defunct altogether in 2009. White Lightning also opened a third studio at 16 Dufours Place, named Space Facilities, in late 1995. However, Space closed in 2008, just a year before The Bridge did. Twentieth Century House in Soho Square was built in 1937 for Twentieth Century Fox. Since 1947, Soho has also been home to De Lane Lea Studios, which is currently owned by Warner Bros. The British Board of Film Classification, formerly known as the British Board of Film Censors, has been based in Soho Square since 1950. Soho's key fibre communications network has been managed by Sohonet since 1995, which connects the Soho media and post-production community to British film studios such as Pinewood and Shepperton, along with other locations worldwide include HBO and Warner Brothers. In the 2010s, research commissioned by Westminster City Council showed 23 per cent of the workforce in Soho worked in the creative industries.

=== Restaurants and clubs ===
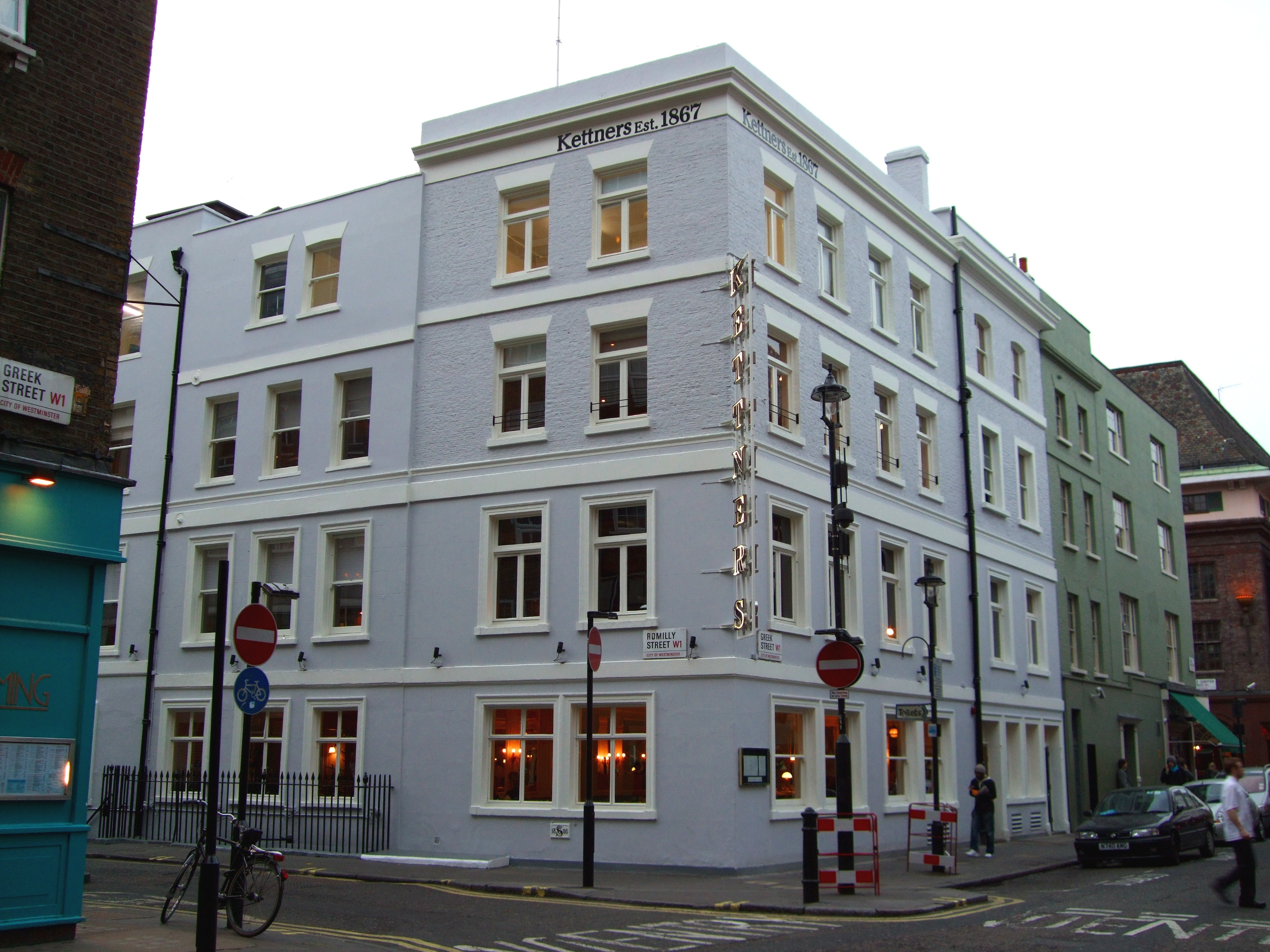
Kettner's

Many small and easily affordable restaurants and cafes were established in Soho during the 19th century, particularly as a result of Greek and Italian immigration. The restaurants were not looked upon favourably at first, but their reputation changed at the start of the 20th century. In 1924, a guide reported "of late years, the inexpensive restaurants of Soho have enjoyed an extraordinary vogue." Arthur Ransome's Bohemia in London (1907) mentions Old and New Soho, including details about Soho coffee-houses including The Moorish Café and The Algerian.

Kettner's was a restaurant on Romilly Street, established in 1867 by Napoleon III's chef Auguste Kettner. It was frequently visited by Albert, Prince of Wales (where he is alleged to

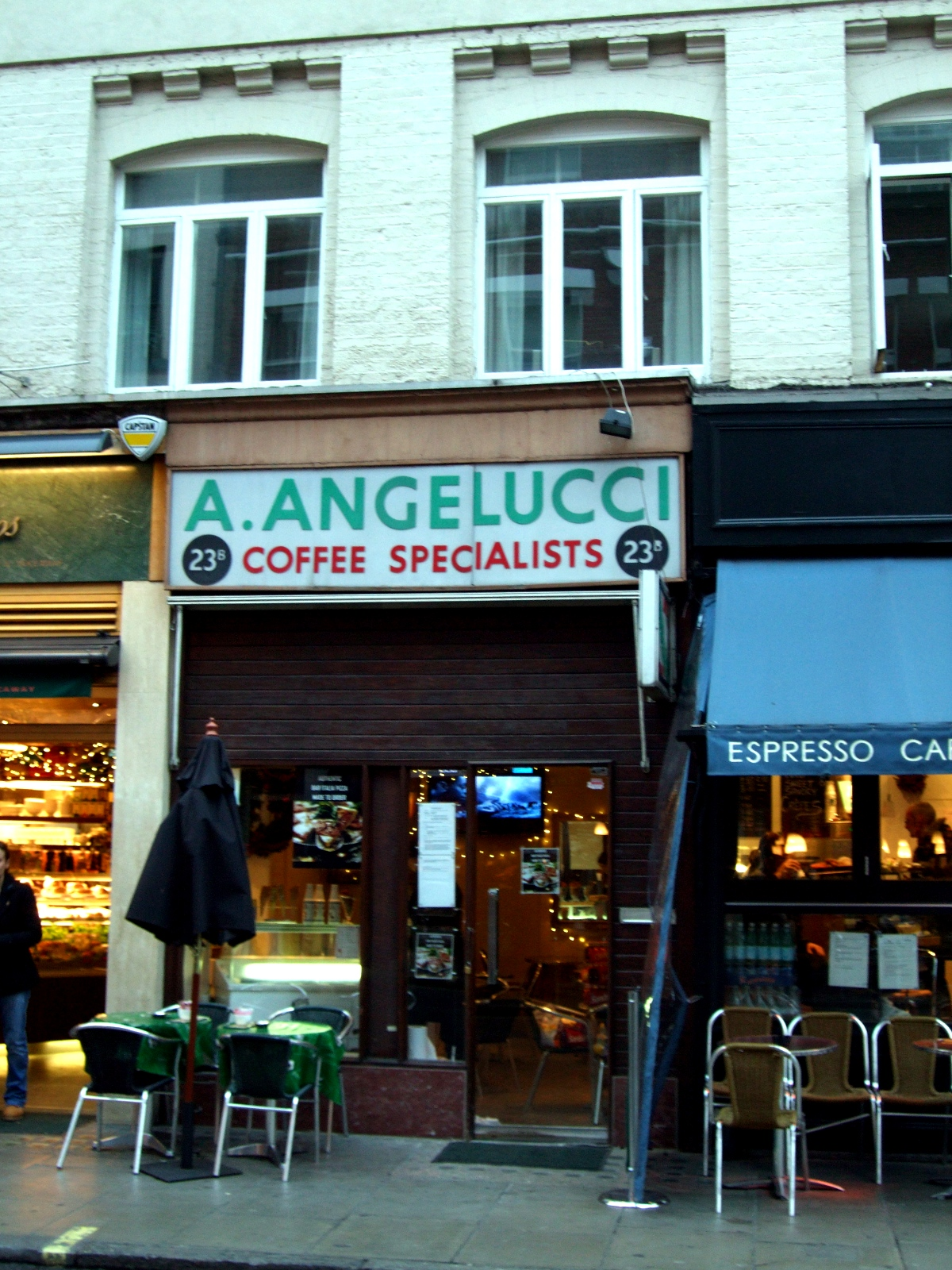
A.Angelucci, a now closed Italian coffee shop on Frith Street which once hosted a cluster of Italian food businesses

have dined with his mistress, Lillie Langtry) and Oscar Wilde. The restaurant survived both World Wars without incident, and was regularly visited by Agatha Christie and Bing Crosby.

In the 20th century, several Soho pubs and private members clubs gained notoriety for both their proprietors and clientele. Clive Jennings says of regular clientele such as journalist Jeffrey Barnard and artist Francis Bacon that "the lethal triangle of The French, The Coach & Horses and The Colony were the staging points of the Dean Street shuffle, with occasional forays into other joints such as The Gargoyle or the Mandrake ... The Groucho or Blacks". Christopher Howse notes of the coterie of bohemian heavy drinkers that "There was no worry about pensions in Soho. People didn't live that long."

The Gargoyle Club opened at 69 Dean Street in 1925. It was founded by the socialite the Hon David Tennant as a place where writers, artists and musicians could mingle with the upper crust and eat and drink at affordable prices for the next three decades. In May 1979 the Gargoyle's uppermost room started hosting a weekly club-night on Saturdays called the Comedy Store, which made the reputations of many of the UK's upcoming "alternative comedians". Among the original lineup here were Alexei Sayle, Rik Mayall and Adrian Edmondson who broke away in 1980 to establish The Comic Strip team at Raymond's Revue Bar, before they found wider recognition with the series The Comic Strip Presents on Channel 4. The Gargoyle's success and Bohemian clientele led to other restaurants being founded around Soho, including the Eiffel Tower and Bellotti's.

During the 1970s the building at 69 Dean Street housed another nightspot in its cellars, initially known as Billy's, and run by Soho's only Jamaican club owner, Vince Howard. The Blitz Kids, a group of London clubgoers who spearheaded the New Romantic movement in the early 1980s, originally met at Billy's. The club changed its name to Gossip's and became part of London's clubland heritage by spawning several weekly club-nights that influenced British music and fashion during the 1980s. Soho contains numerous restaurants influenced by historical patterns of migration in London. The area includes establishments associated with Italian and French communities, as well as Asian and Middle Eastern cuisines.

Gerrard Street is the centre of London's Chinatown, and along with Lisle Street and Little Newport Street, house a mix of import companies, oriental food shops and restaurants. Street festivals are held throughout the year, particularly on the Chinese New Year. In March 2022, Cadbury opened a temporary vegan chocolate shop at 15 Bateman Street.

=== Radio ===
Soho Radio is an internet radio station on Great Windmill Street, next to the Windmill Theatre. Since May 2014 it has been streaming live and pre-recorded programming from its premises, which also function as a retail space and coffee shop. The station states on its website that it aims "to reflect the culture of Soho through our vibrant and diverse content". There is no playlist policy, and presenters are allowed to play any music they like. In 2016, it was voted the world's best radio station at Mixcloud's Online Radio Awards.

=== Religion ===
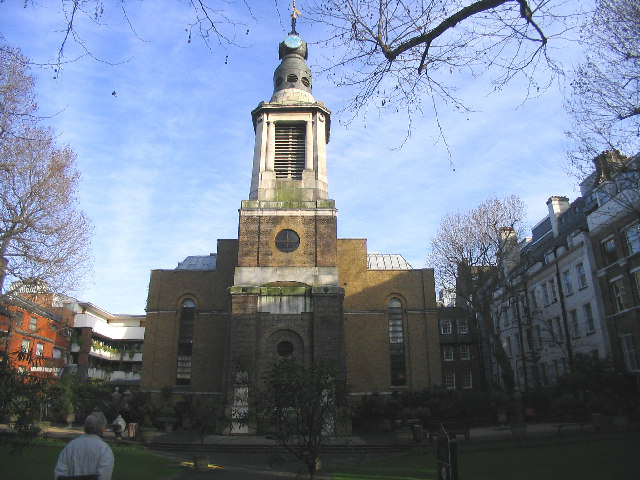
St Anne's Church

Soho is home to numerous religious and spiritual groups. St Anne's Church on Wardour Street was built between 1677 and 1686, possibly to the design of Sir Christopher Wren or William Talman. An additional tower was built in 1717 by Talman and reconstructed in 1803. The church was damaged by a V1 flying bomb during World War II in 1940, but the tower survived. In 1976, John Betjeman campaigned to save the building. The church was fully restored in the late 1980s and formally re-opened by the Princess Royal on 12 March 1990. The Church of Our Lady of the Assumption and St Gregory on Warwick Street was built in 1788 and is the only remaining 18th-century Roman Catholic embassy chapel in London and principal church of the Personal Ordinariate of Our Lady of Walsingham. St Patrick's Church in Soho Square was built in 1792 to accommodate Irish immigrants who had moved to the area.

Other religious buildings in Soho include the Hare Krishna Temple off Soho Square, which was part-funded by George Harrison and opened in 1979. There exists a small mosque on Berwick Street. The French Protestant Church of London, the only one of its kind in the city and constructed in the Flemish Gothic style, has been at Nos. 8–9 Soho Square since 1893.

=== Music ===
The music scene in Soho can be traced back to 1948 and Club Eleven, generally regarded as the first venue where modern jazz, or bebop, was performed in the UK. It closed in 1950 following a drugs raid. The Harmony Inn was a hang-out for musicians on Archer Street operating during the 1940s and 1950s.

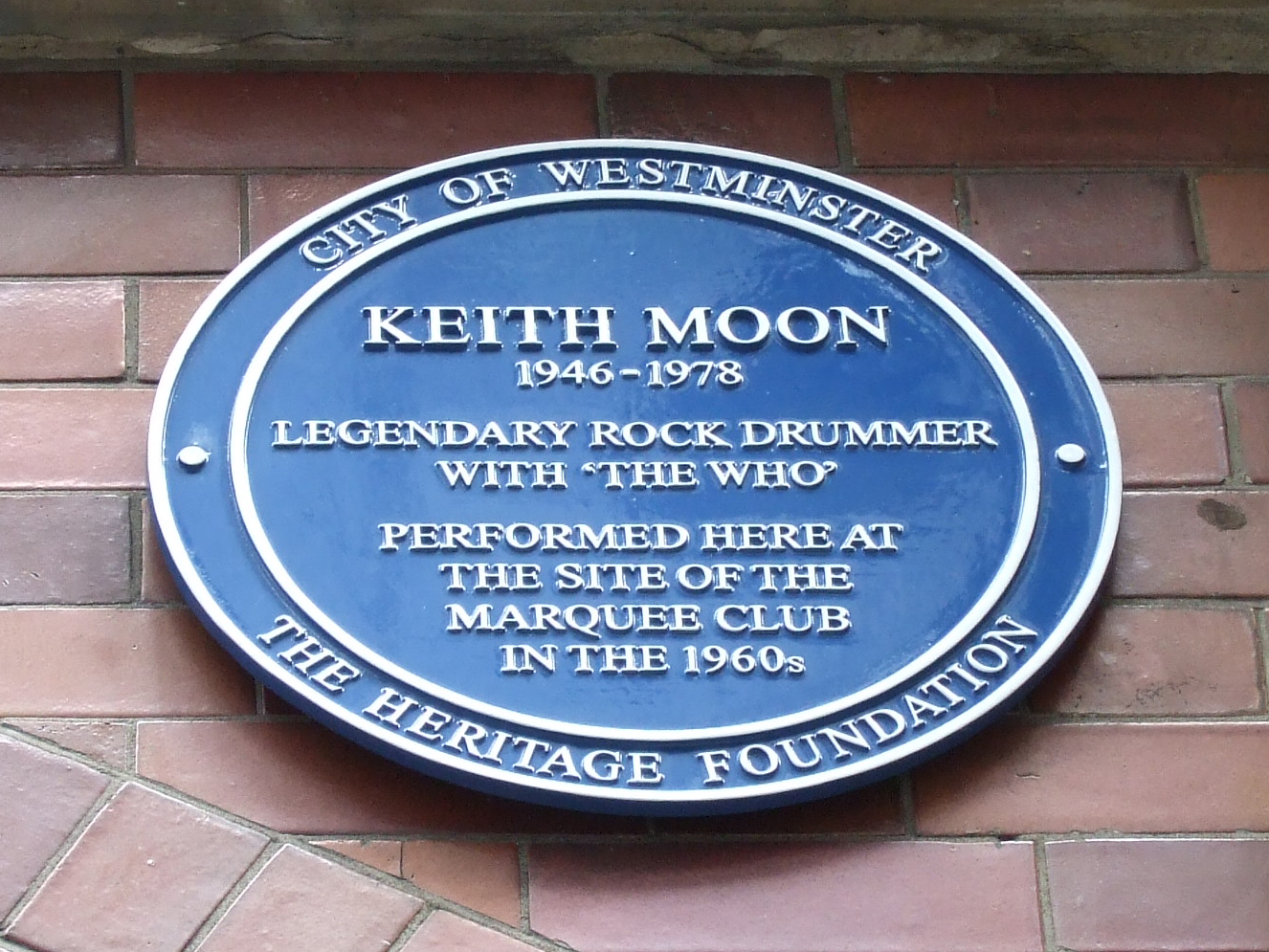
A blue plaque at the site of the Marquee Club on Wardour Street, Soho, commemorating Keith Moon's performances there with The Who

The Ken Colyer Band's 51 Club, a venue for traditional jazz, opened on Great Newport Street in 1951. Blues guitarist and harmonica player Cyril Davies and guitarist Bob Watson launched the London Skiffle Centre, London's first skiffle club, on the first floor of the Roundhouse pub on Wardour Street in 1952. It was renamed the London Blues and Barrelhouse Club in the late 1950s, and closed in 1964.

In the early 1950s, Soho became the centre of the beatnik culture in London. The first coffee bar to open was Moka at No. 29 Frith Street. It was formally opened in 1953 by the film star Gina Lollobrigida, and the frothed coffee produced from stainless steel machines was pioneering in British culture. Le Macabre on Wardour Street, had coffin-shaped tables, fostered beat poetry, jive dance and political debate. The Goings On, in Archer Street, was a Sunday afternoon club organised by the beat poet Pete Brown, active in the mid-1960s. For the rest of the week, it operated as an illegal gambling den. Pink Floyd played at the club at the beginning of their career.

The 2i's Coffee Bar was one of the first rock clubs in Europe. It initially opened on No. 44 Gerard Street in 1956, but soon moved to its more famous venue of No. 59 Old Compton Street. Soho quickly became the centre of the fledgling rock scene in London. Clubs included the Flamingo Club, a regular gig for Georgie Fame, Ronan O'Rahilly's The Scene, which opened in 1963 and catered for the Mod movement with regular attendees including Steve Marriot and Andrew Loog Oldham, and jazz clubs like Ronnie Scott's, which opened in 1959 at 39 Gerrard Street and moved to 47 Frith Street in 1965.

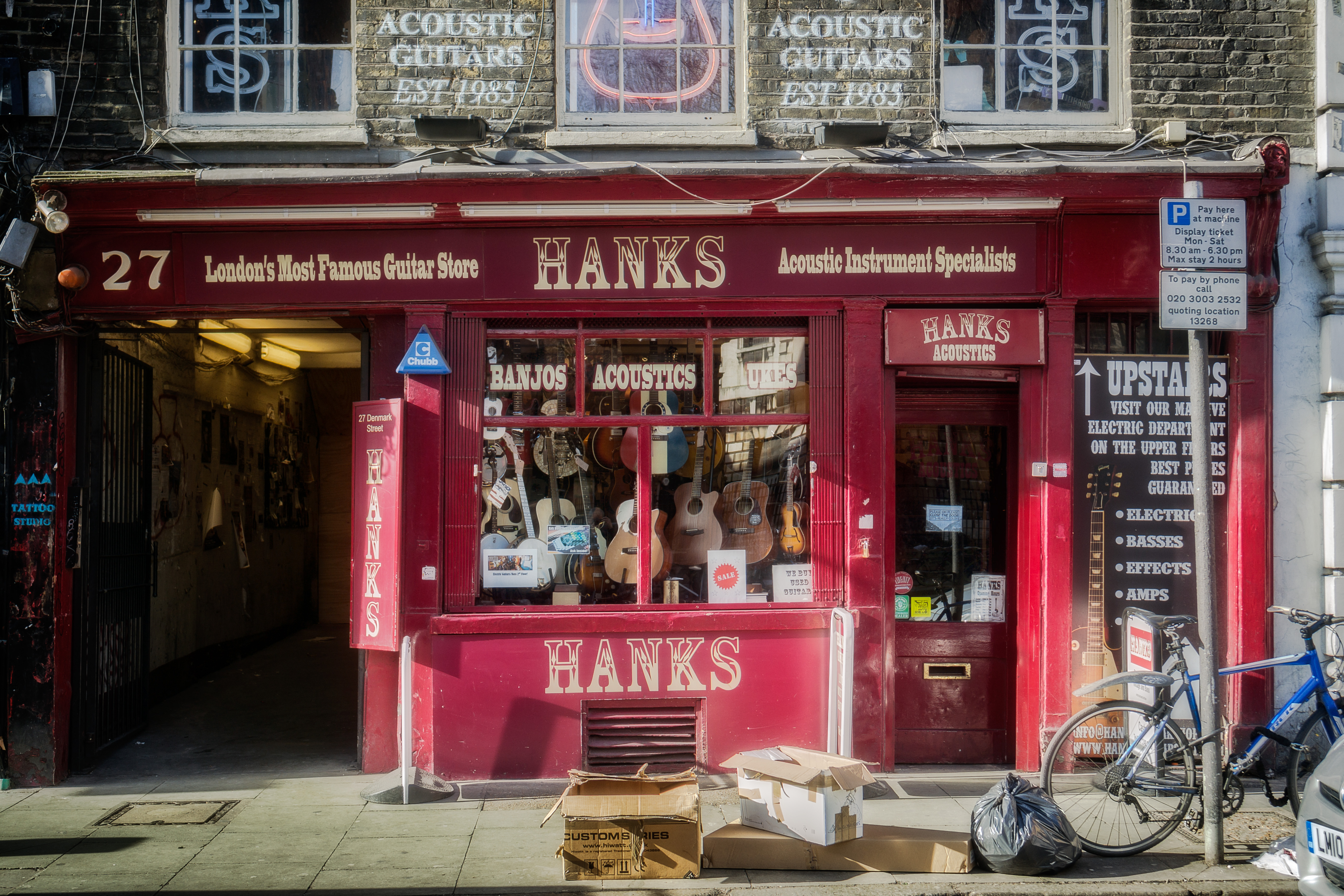
A typical music shop on Denmark Street

Soho's Wardour Street was the home of the Marquee Club, which opened in 1958. In the 1960s, numerous major rock bands played at the venue, including early performances from the Rolling Stones in July 1962 and The Who in late 1964, Jimi Hendrix, David Bowie, Led Zeppelin, Pink Floyd, Jethro Tull, AC/DC and Iron Maiden. Eric Clapton and Brian Jones both lived for a time in Soho, sharing a flat with future rock publicist, Tony Brainsby.

Trident Studios was based at 17 St Anne's Court, Soho and was a major London recording studio. It was established by Norman and Barry Sheffield in 1968, who wanted to expand from the small studio they had above their music shop. It became immediately successful after The Beatles decided to record several tracks on The White Album there, as the facilities were better than Abbey Road studios. Queen were originally managed by the Sheffields, and recorded their first four albums at Trident. Other artists who recorded at Trident include David Bowie, Elton John, Free and Thin Lizzy. It closed as a general-purpose recording studio in 1981, but has since reopened in various guises, including providing sound and mixing services for television.

Although technically not part of Soho, the adjacent Denmark Street is known for its connections with British popular music, and is nicknamed the British Tin Pan Alley due to its large concentration of shops selling musical instruments. The Sex Pistols lived beneath No. 6 and recorded their first demos there. Jimi Hendrix, the Rolling Stones and David Bowie have all recorded at studios on Denmark Street and Elton John wrote his hit "Your Song" in the street. Led Zeppelin's first rehearsal in 1968 was in a basement studio on Gerrard Street.

=== Sex industry ===
St Anne's Court in the early 1960s

The Soho area has been at the heart of London's sex industry for more than 200 years; between 1778 and 1801, 21 Soho Square was location of the White House, a brothel described by the magistrate Henry Mayhew as "a notorious place of ill-fame". Shortly before World War I, two rival gangs, one led by Chan Nan (also called "Brilliant Chang") and the other by Eddie Manning, controlled drugs and prostitution in Soho. Both were eventually arrested and imprisoned; Manning died midway through a three-year sentence in 1933. Following World War II, gangs set up rings of prostitutes in the area, concentrated around Brewer Street and Rupert Street. Photographers also visited Soho in the hope of being able to blackmail people caught in the act of visiting prostitutes.

When the Street Offences Act 1959 drove prostitution off the streets, many clubs such as the Blue Lagoon at No. 50 Carnaby Street became fronts for it. Gangs controlled the clubs and the prostitutes, and the police were bribed. In 1960 London's first sex cinema, the Compton Cinema Club (a members-only club to get around the law), opened at 56 Old Compton Street. It was owned by Michael Klinger and Tony Tenser who later produced two early Roman Polanski films, including Repulsion (1965). As post-war austerity relaxed into the "swinging '60s", clip joints also surfaced; these unlicensed establishments sold coloured water as champagne with the promise of sex to follow, thus fleecing tourists looking for a "good time". Harrison Marks, a "glamour photographer" and girlie magazine publisher, had a photographic gallery on Gerrard Street and published several magazines in the 1950s and '60s. The model Pamela Green prompted him to take up nude photography, and she remained the creative force in their business.

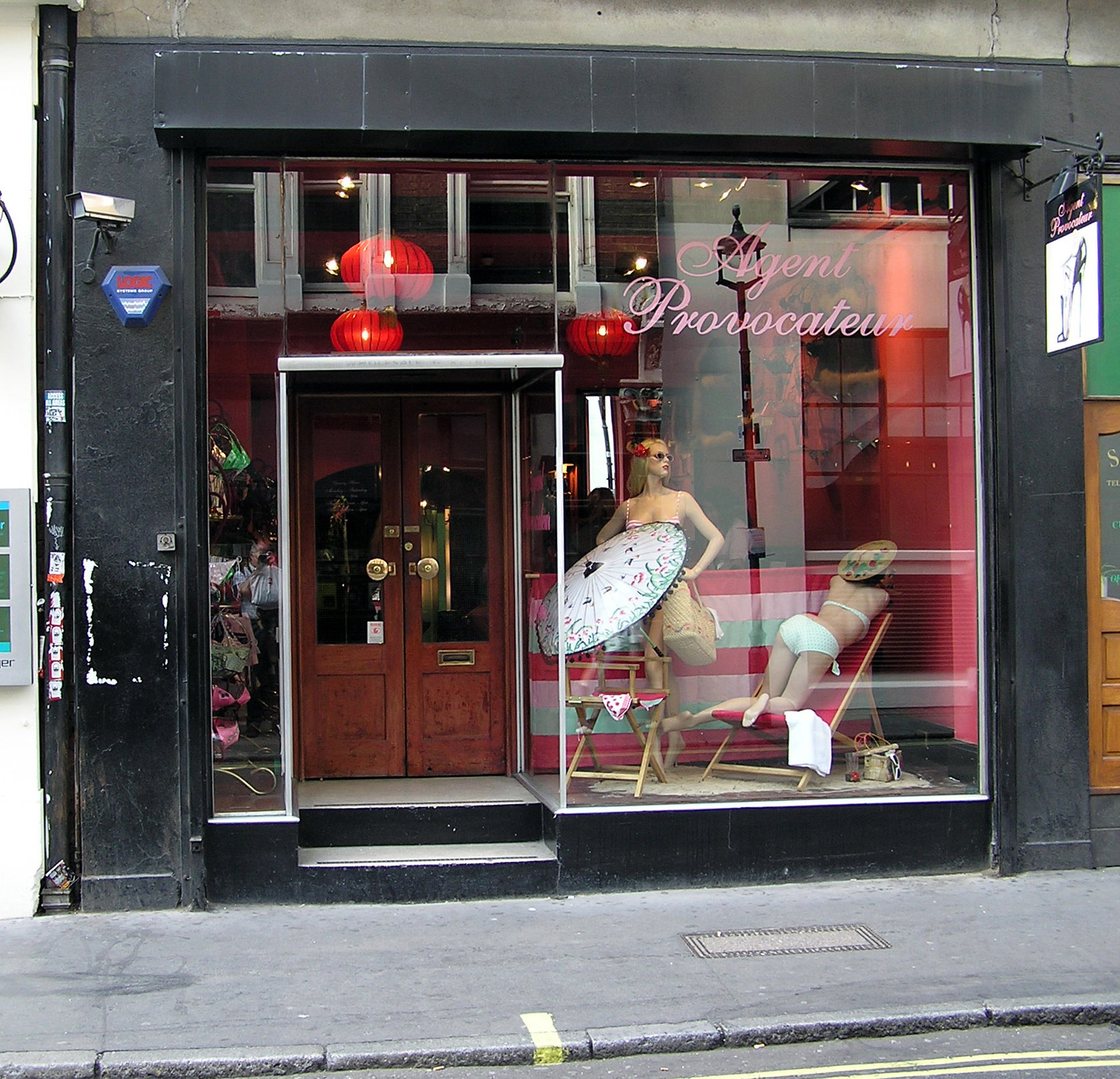
Agent Provocateur, lingerie retailer at 6 Broadwick Street

By the 1970s, the sex shops had grown from the handful opened by Carl Slack in the early 1960s. From 1976 to 1982, Soho had 54 sex shops, 39 sex cinemas and cinema clubs, 16 strip and peep shows, 11 sex-oriented clubs and 12 licensed massage parlours. The proliferation of sex shops dissuaded some people from visiting Soho. The growth of the sex industry in Soho during this time was partly caused by corruption in the Metropolitan Police. The vice squad at the time suffered from police officers enforcing against organised crime in the area, while simultaneously accepting bribes. This changed following the appointment of Robert Mark as Commissioner, who began to crack down on corruption. In 1972 local residents started the Soho Society in order to control the increasing expansion of the sex industry in the area and improve it with a comprehensive redevelopment plan. This led to a series of corruption trials in 1975, following which several senior police officers were imprisoned. This caused a small recession in Soho which depressed property values at the time Paul Raymond had started buying freeholds there.

By the 1980s, purges of the police force along with pressure from the Soho Society and new and tighter licensing controls by the City of Westminster led to a crackdown on illegal premises. The number of sex industry premises dropped from 185 in 1982 to around 30 in 1991. By 2000, substantial relaxation of general censorship, the ready availability of non-commercial sex, and the licensing or closing of unlicensed sex shops had reduced the red-light area to just a small area around Berwick Street. Much of the business has been reported to have been run by Albanian gangs. By the end of 2014, gentrification and competition from the internet had reduced the number of flats in Soho used for prostitution (see Soho walk-up), but the area remains a red-light district and a centre of the sex industry in London.

=== Health and welfare ===
The National Hospital for Diseases of the Heart and Paralysis was established at No. 32 Soho Square in 1874. The property had previously been owned by the naturalist and botanist Sir Joseph Banks. It moved to Westmoreland Street in 1914, and then to Fulham Road in 1991.

In July 2019, Soho was reported to be the unhealthiest place to live in Britain. Researchers from the University of Liverpool found that the area had the greatest access to takeaways, pubs and off-licences and these were combined with high levels of air pollution and low levels of parks and green spaces.

== Streets ==
Berwick Street was built between 1687 and 1703, and is probably named after James FitzJames, 1st Duke of Berwick, the illegitimate son of James II of England. It has held a street market since the early 18th century, which has been formally organised since 1892.

Carnaby Street was laid out in the late 17th century. It was named after Karnaby House, built on the street's eastern side in 1683. It was a popular residence for Huguenots at first, before becoming populated by shops in the 19th century. In 1957, a fashion boutique was opened, and Carnaby Street became the fashion centre of 1960s Swinging London, although it quickly became known for poor quality "kitsch" products.

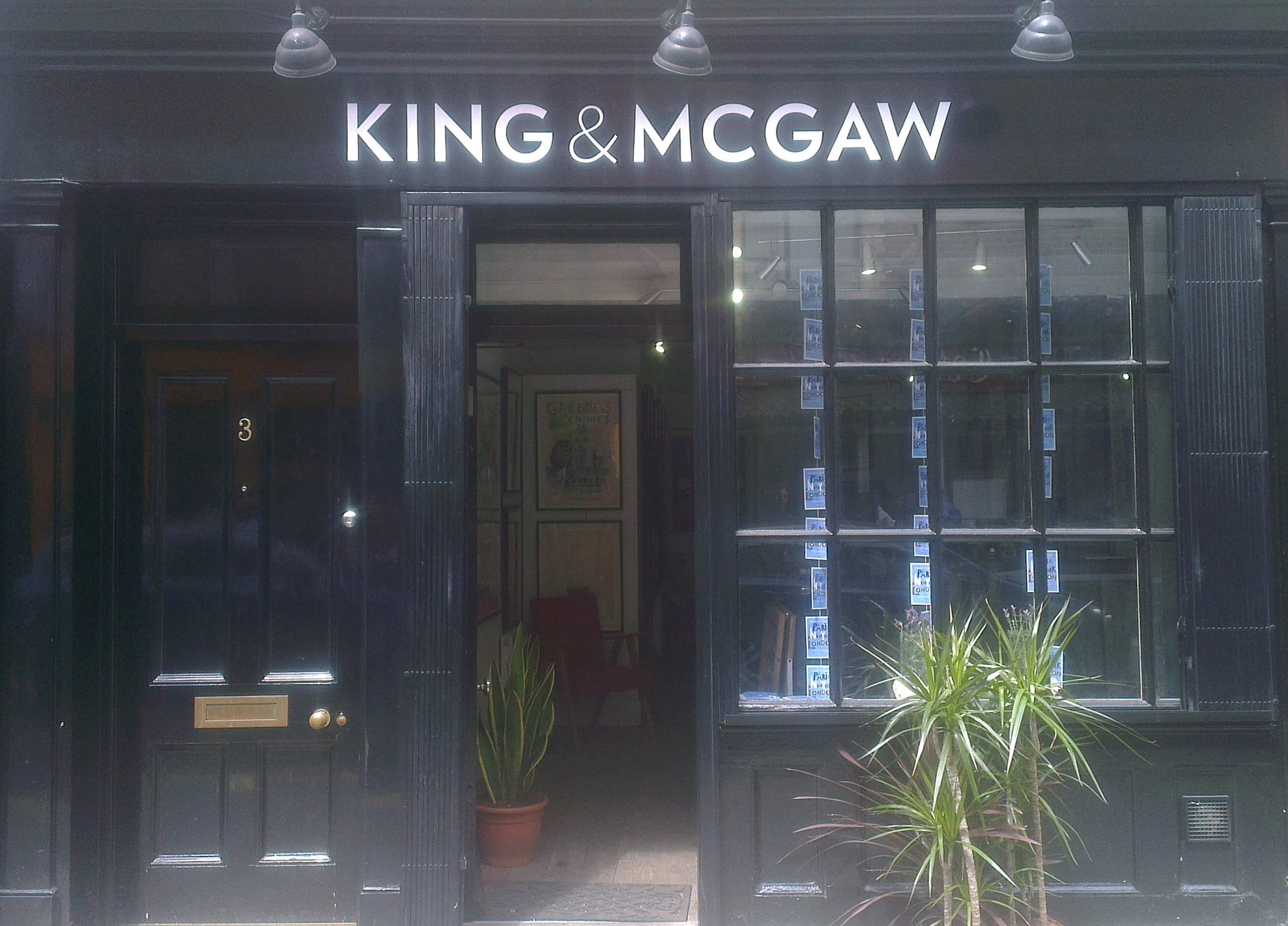
A pop-up shop on D'Arblay Street, London

D'Arblay Street was laid out between 1735 and 1744. It was originally known as Portland Street after William Bentinck, 2nd Duke of Portland, and given its current named in 1909 in commemoration of Frances Burney, Madame D'Arblay, who had lived in Poland Street nearby, when she was young. The George public house at No. 1 was opened in 1889, but there has been a tavern on this site since 1739. Several of the original houses have survived into the 21st century.

Dean Street was built in the 1680s and was originally settled by French immigrants. It is home to the Soho Theatre and a pub known as The French House, which during the Second World War was popular with the French government-in-exile. Karl Marx lived at No. 64 Dean Street around 1850. The Colony Club was founded by Muriel Belcher and based at No. 41 Dean Street from 1948 to 2008. It was frequented by several important artists including Francis Bacon, Lucian Freud and Frank Auerbach.

Frith Street was named after Richard Frith, a local builder. On Rocque's Map of London it is marked as Thrift Street. It was a popular aristocratic residence, although without as many foreign residents as some other streets. A plaque above the stage door of the Prince Edward Theatre identifies the site where Mozart lived as a child between 1764 and 1765. John Logie Baird first demonstrated television in his laboratory at No 22 in 1926; the site is now the location of Bar Italia. Ronnie Scott's Jazz Club is located at No 46 Frith Street, having moved there from Gerrard Street in 1965.

Greek Street was first laid out around 1680 and was named after a nearby Greek church. It initially housed several upper-class tenants including Arthur Annesley, 5th Earl of Anglesey, and Peter Plunket, 4th Earl of Fingall. Thomas De Quincey lived in the street after running away from Manchester Grammar School in 1802. Josiah Wedgwood ran his main pottery warehouse and showrooms at Nos. 12–13 between 1774 and 1797. The street now mostly contains restaurants, and several historical buildings from the early 18th century are still standing.

Gerrard Street was built between 1677 and 1685 on land, called the Military Ground, which was owned by Charles Gerard, 1st Earl of Macclesfield. The initial development contained a large house belonging to the Earl of Devonshire, which was subsequently occupied by Charles Montagu, 4th Earl of Manchester, Thomas Wharton, Baron Wharton, and Richard Lumley, 1st Earl of Scarbrough. Several foreign restaurants had become established on Gerrard Street by the end of the 19th century, including the Hotel des Etrangers and the Mont Blanc. Ronnie Scott's Jazz Club opened at 39 Gerrard Street in 1959 and remained there until its move to No 47 Frith Street in 1965. Scott kept 39 Gerrard Street open for up-and-coming British jazz musicians (referred to as 'the Old Place') until the lease ran out in 1967. The 43 Club was based on Gerrard Street. It was one of the most notorious clubs in Soho, run as a cover for organised crime and illegal after-hours selling of alcohol; following a police investigation, the owner Kate Meyrick was jailed in 1928. During the 1950s, the cheap rents on Gerrard Street attracted Chinese Londoners, many who moved from Poplar. By 1970, the street had become the centre of London's Chinatown, and it became pedestrianised and decorated with a Chinese gateway and lanterns. It continues to host numerous Chinese restaurants and shops into the 21st century.

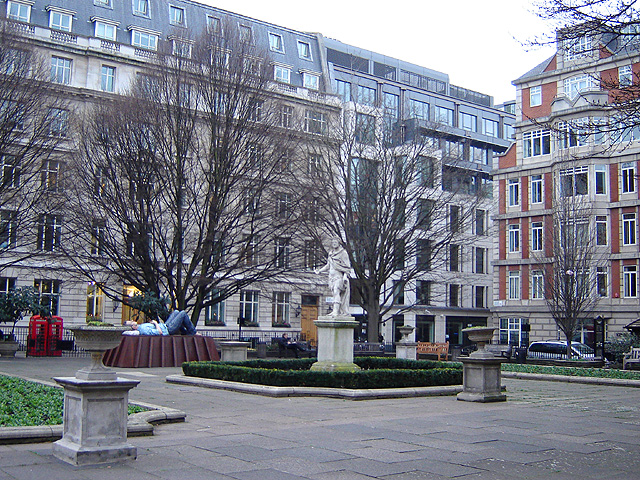
Golden Square

Golden Square is a garden square to the southwest of Soho. Built over land formerly used for grazing, its name is a corruption of gelding. Building began in 1675 and it was complete by the early 18th century. It was originally home to several upper-class residents, including Barbara Villiers, Duchess of Cleveland, James Brydges (later to become 1st Duke of Chandos), and Henry St John, 1st Viscount St John. By the mid-18th century the aristocracy had moved west towards Mayfair, and a number of foreign embassies were established around the square. In the 19th century, it became a popular residence for local musicians and instrument makers, while by the 20th it had become an established centre of woollen merchants. A statue of King George II sits in the centre of the square, designed by John Van Nost and constructed in 1753.

Great Marlborough Street was first laid out in the early 18th century, and named after the military commander John Churchill, 1st Duke of Marlborough. The street was initially fashionable and was home to numerous peers. The London College of Music was based at No. 47 from 1896 to 1990, while the department store Liberty is on the corner with Regent Street. The street was the location of Philip Morris's original London factory and gave its name to the Marlboro brand of cigarettes. Marlborough Street Magistrates Court was based at No. 20–21 and had become one of the country's most important magistrates courts by the late 19th century. The Marquess of Queensberry's libel trial against Oscar Wilde took place here in 1895. The Rolling Stones' Mick Jagger and Keith Richards were tried for drugs possession at the court in 1967, with fellow band member Brian Jones being similarly charged a year later.

Great Windmill Street (Note: Great Windmill Street (not indicated on this map, but located below Lexington Street)) was named after a 17th-century windmill on this location. The Scottish anatomist William Hunter opened his anatomical theatre at No. 16 in 1766, running it until his death in 1783. It continued to be used for anatomical lectures until 1831. The principles of The Communist Manifesto were laid out by Karl Marx in 1850 at a meeting in the Red Lion pub.

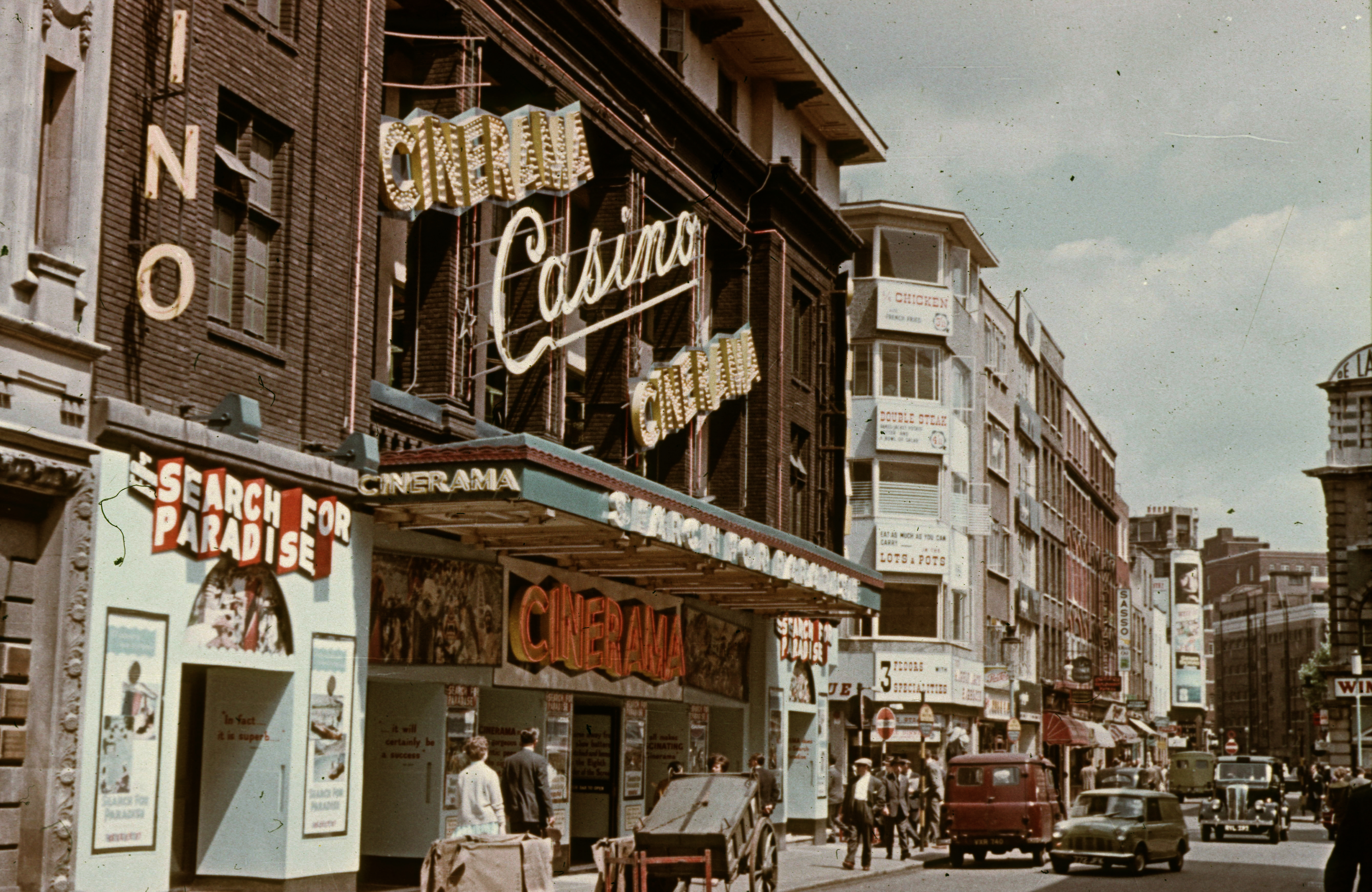
Old Compton Street in 1960

Old Compton Street is named after the Bishop of London Henry Compton, and was first laid out in the 1670s, fully developed by 1683. During the late 18th and 19th centuries, it became a popular meeting place for French exiles. The street was the birthplace of Europe's rock club circuit (2i's club) and contained the first adult cinema in England (The Compton Cinema Club). Dougie Millings, who was the famous tailor for The Beatles, had his first shop at 63 Old Compton Street, which opened in 1962. Old Compton Street is now the core of London's main gay village, where there are several businesses catering for the gay community.

Poland Street was named for the King of Poland pub which stood at one end. It was destroyed by a bomb in 1940. Henry Howard, 6th Earl of Suffolk lived at No. 15 in 1717, while Percy Bysshe Shelley briefly lodged in the street in 1811. William Blake lived at No. 28 from 1785 to 1791, and wrote several works there, including Songs of Innocence and The Book of Thel. The street was the site of the St James Workhouse whose infirmary is believed to be the predecessor to the St. James Infirmary. The first multi-storey car park in London opened on Poland Street in 1934.

Wardour Street dates back to 1585, when it was known as Commonhedge Lane and connected Oxford Street to the King's Mews (now part of Trafalgar Square). It began to be built up in the 1680s and was named after local landowner Edward Wardour. Most of the original houses were rebuilt in the 18th century, and the street became known for antiques and furniture dealers. Several music publishers were established along Wardour Street in the early 20th century, including Novello and Co at Nos. 152–160. The most famous location of the Marquee Club was at No. 90 Wardour Street between 1964 and 1988. Another 1970s rock hangout was The Intrepid Fox pub (at 97/99 Wardour Street), originally dedicated to Charles James Fox (who is featured on a relief on the outside of the building). It subsequently became a haven for the Goth subculture before closing in 2006.

== Cultural references ==
A detailed mural depicting Soho characters, including writer Dylan Thomas and jazz musician George Melly, is in Broadwick Street, at the junction with Carnaby Street.

In fiction, Robert Louis Stevenson had Dr. Henry Jekyll set up a home for Edward Hyde in Soho in his novel, Strange Case of Dr Jekyll and Mr Hyde. Charles Dickens referred to Soho in several of his works; in A Tale of Two Cities, Lucie Manette and her father Dr. Alexandre Manette live on Soho Square, while Golden Square is mentioned in Nicholas Nickleby, in which Ralph Nickleby has a house on the square, and the George II statue in the centre is described as "mournful". Joseph Conrad used Soho as the home for The Secret Agent, a French immigrant who ran a pornography shop. Dan Kavanagh (Julian Barnes)'s 1980 novel Duffy is set in Soho.

Lee Ho Fook's is mentioned in Warren Zevon's song "Werewolves of London". The Who song "Pinball Wizard", also covered by Elton John, contains the line "From Soho down to Brighton, I must've played them all", in reference to the locations frequented by the title character. The Pogues 1986 song "A Rainy Night in Soho", written and sung by Shane MacGowan (and covered by Bono and Johnny Depp) frames night-time in the district. "Lola" by The Kinks sees the story-teller of the song meeting a transgender woman by the name of Lola in a club in Soho.

Soho Stories is a 1996 BBC fly on the wall series filmed around Soho and directed by Chris Terrill.

The area is the setting for the 2021 film Last Night in Soho by Edgar Wright.

== See also ==
- List of schools in the City of Westminster
- Street names of Soho
