= Metroland =

Metroland may refer to:

- Metro-land, an informal name for a suburban area north-west of London, England served by the Metropolitan Line
- Metro-land (1973 film), a BBC TV documentary (1973) by Sir John Betjeman about the area
- Metroland (novel), a book by Julian Barnes where the subject comes from that part of London

- Metroland (film), a 1997 film based on the Julian Barnes novel
- Metroland (soundtrack), the soundtrack by Mark Knopfler

- Metroland Media Group, a publisher of daily and community newspapers in Canada
- "Metroland", a song by Orchestral Manoeuvres in the Dark from the album English Electric
- Metroland (newspaper), a defunct alternative newsweekly published in Albany, New York, whose editorial staff largely formed its successor The Alt
- Metroland, a former theme park in the MetroCentre complex in Gateshead, England
