= Amanda Ryan =

British actress (born 1971)

- Born: 10 October 1971 (age 54); London, England
- Education: Royal Academy of Dramatic Art
- Occupation: Actress

Amanda Ryan (born 10 October 1971) is an English actress who trained at London's Royal Academy of Dramatic Art. She is best known for portraying Lettice Howard in Elizabeth and Vera Campbell in Britannic, as well as for her role on Channel 4's popular comedy drama Shameless as Sgt. Carrie Rogers and her appearance in the music video for "Walk Away" by Funeral for a Friend.

== Career ==
Ryan's most internationally recognised role was when she played Lettice Howard, the fictional lover of the Duke of Norfolk in the Academy Award winning 1998 film Elizabeth starring Cate Blanchett.

The previous year Ryan played Joanna in the 1997 film Metroland, based on the 1980 novel of the same name by Julian Barnes. She starred in the Inspector Morse episode "The Daughters of Cain" as Kay Brooks. She has appeared in productions such as the BBC2 series Attachments, and the television adaptations of The Forsyte Saga and as Agnes Wickfield in the 1999 BBC adaptation of the Charles Dickens novel David Copperfield. She also played Vera Campbell in the 2000 Fox Family Channel movie Britannic and Verity Wright in EastEnders.

Ryan's stage career includes credits in British productions of Patrick Marber's Closer, Simon Gray's Otherwise Engaged, Chekhov's The Wood Demon and in 2008 the part of Cathy in an adaptation of Wuthering Heights by April De Angelis.

== Filmography ==
Film and television
Year	Title	Role	Notes
1993	The Micronots!	Jasmine (navigator)	TV series
1996	The Bill	Jodie	TV series – episode: "Bits and Pieces"
1996	Wycliffe	Jane Trethowan	TV series – episode: "Last Judgement"
1996	Jude	Gypsy Saleswoman	Film
1996	Poldark	Cuby Trevanion	TV film
1996	Inspector Morse	Kay Brooks	TV series – episode: "The Daughters of Cain"
1997	The New Adventures of Robin Hood	Catherine	TV series – episode: "The Birthday Trap"
1997	The Hunger	Musidora	TV series – episode: "The Swords"
1997	Metroland	Joanna	Film
1997	The Woodlanders	Sukey Damson	Film
1998	The Man Who Held His Breath	Lulu	Short
1998	Elizabeth	Lettice Howard	Film
1998	Supply & Demand	Natasha	TV Miniseries – episodes: "Blood Ties: Part 1"; "Blood Ties: Part 2"
1999	Simon Magus	Sarah	Film
1999	Kavanagh QC	Charlotte Sinclair	TV series – episode: "Previous Convictions"
1999	The Escort	Ann	Film
1999	David Copperfield	Agnes Wickfield	TV film
2000	Britannic	Vera Campbell	TV film
2000	Best	Mrs. Crevand	Film
2000	Attachments	Sophie Moore	TV series
2001	The Inspector Lynley Mysteries	Deborah St. James	TV series – episode: "A Great Deliverance"
2002	The Forsyte Saga	Holly	TV Miniseries
2002	Whoosh	Josie	Short
2002	Dalziel and Pascoe	Kate Lowry	TV series – episode: "The Unwanted"
2003	Real Men	Greta Banham	TV film
2003	The Forsyte Saga: To Let	Holly Dartie née Forsyte	TV Miniseries
2004	Murphy's Law	Romy	TV series – episode: "Ringers"
2004	Stealing Lives	DV Karen Hearst	TV film
2005	Murder Investigation Team	Helen Cousins	TV series – episode: No. 2.2
2005	Christmas Merry	Julia	Short
2005	Red Mercury	Electra	Film
2006	The Amazing Mrs. Pritchard	Ronnie Johnson	TV series – episode: No. 1.4
2007	Sparkle	Kate	Film
2007	EastEnders	Verity	TV series – episodes: 28 May 2007, 4 May 2007, 1 May 2007
2007–2009	Shameless	Carrie Rogers	TV series – 21 episodes
2009	Midsomer Murders	Martha Filby	TV series – episode: ""The Creeper"
2011	Lewis	Gina Goffe	TV series – episode: "Wild Justice"
2014	Suspects	Rachel Sullivan	1 episode
2014	Casualty	Scarlet Wren	1 episode – 26 April 2014
2015	Anti-Social	Claire	Film
2024	Casualty	Melanie Sinclair	TV series
2025-present	Emmerdale	DS Walsh	TV series
