= A History of the World in 10½ Chapters =

1989 novel by Julian Barnes

- First edition
- Author: Julian Barnes
- Cover artist: Morgan Bible folio 2v
- Language: English
- Publisher: Jonathan Cape (United Kingdom), Alfred A. Knopf (United States), Knopf Canada (Canada)
- Publication date: October 7, 1989 (United States)
- Publication place: United Kingdom
- Media type: Print (Hardcover)
- Pages: 307
- ISBN: 0-224-03190-2 (First Edition); ISBN 0-394-58061-3 (First American Edition); ISBN 0-394-22121-4 (First Canadian Edition)
- OCLC: 8569817
- Dewey Decimal: 823.914
- LC Class: PR6052.A6657
- Preceded by: Staring at the Sun
- Followed by: Talking It Over

A History of the World in 10½ Chapters is a 1989 book by English writer Julian Barnes. Usually described as a novel, it is actually a collection of subtly connected short stories written in different styles. In a review Joyce Carol Oates describes them as "a gathering of prose pieces, some fiction, others rather like essays".

One of the several recurrent motifs is that of ships.

== Plot ==
Chapter 1, "The Stowaway", is an alternative account of the story of Noah's Ark from the point of view of the woodworms, who were not allowed onboard and were stowaways during the journey. The woodworm who narrates the first chapter questions the wisdom of appointing Noah as God's representative. The woodworm was left out of the ark, just like the other "impure" or "insignificant" species; but a colony of woodworms enters the ark as stowaways and they survive the Great Deluge. The woodworm becomes one of the many connecting figures, appearing in almost every chapter and implying processes of decay, especially of knowledge and historical understanding.

Chapter 2, "The Visitors", describes the hijacking of a cruise liner, similar to the 1985 incident of the Achille Lauro.

Chapter 3, "The Wars of Religion", reports a trial against the woodworms in a church, as they have caused the building to become unstable.

Chapter 4, "The Survivor", is set in a world in which the Chernobyl disaster was "the first big accident". Journalists report that the world is on the brink of nuclear war. The protagonist escapes by boat to avoid the assumed inevitability of a nuclear holocaust. Whether this occurred or is merely a result of the protagonist's paranoia is left ambiguous.

Chapter 5, "Shipwreck", is an analysis of Géricault's painting, The Raft of the Medusa. The first half narrates the historical events of the shipwreck and the survival of the crew members. The second half of the chapter analyses the painting itself. It describes Géricault's "softening" the impact of reality in order to preserve the aestheticism of the work, or to make the story of what happened more palatable.

Chapter 6, "The Mountain", describes the journey of a religious woman to a monastery where she wants to intercede for her dead father. The Raft of the Medusa plays a role in this story as well.

Chapter 7, "Three Simple Stories", portrays a survivor from the RMS Titanic, the Biblical story of Jonah and the whale, and the Jewish refugees on board the MS St. Louis in 1939, who were prevented from landing in the United States and other countries.

Chapter 8, "Upstream!", consists of letters from an actor who travels to a remote jungle for a film project, described as similar to The Mission (1986). His letters grow more philosophical and complicated as he deals with the living situations, the personalities of his costars and the director, and the peculiarities of the indigenous population, coming to a climax when his colleague is drowned in an accident with a raft.

The unnumbered half-chapter, "Parenthesis", is inserted between Chapters 8 and 9. It is in the form of an essay rather than a short story and offers a philosophical discussion on love, and briefly history. There is a direct reference to Julian Barnes in this half chapter. A parallel is drawn with El Greco's painting Burial of the Count of Orgaz, in which the artist confronts the viewer. The piece includes a discussion of lines from Philip Larkin's poem "An Arundel Tomb" ("What will survive of us is love") and from W. H. Auden's "September 1, 1939" ("We must love one another or die").

Chapter 9, "Project Ararat", tells the story of a fictional astronaut Spike Tiggler, based on James Irwin. Tiggler launches an expedition to recover what remains of Noah's Ark. There is overlap with Chapter 6, "The Mountain."

Chapter 10, "The Dream", is an account of a modernized version of heaven, where even Hitler is found. It is individualised for each person and the occupants eventually "die".

== Critical reception ==
Reviewing A History of the World in 10½ Chapters for The Guardian, Jonathan Coe found that it, "while hardly a ground-breaking piece of experimentalism, succeeds to the extent that it is both intelligent and reasonably accessible. Where it falls down is in denying its reader any real focus of human attention or involvement". He added that, "To dismiss the book as being too clever (or merely clever, for that matter) would be ungenerous as well as facile. Barnes is clearly serious about his themes, and there's more than a nod towards emotional commitment. One of his central concerns is the nature of history, and naturally enough - as a good, free-thinking, commonsense, late-20th-century liberal - he rejects any theory of history as pattern or continuum: 'It's more like a multi-media collage,' he explains, and this, of course, is the rationale behind the novel's own structural disjointedness". Coe judged that the book failed to explore history's relationship with the exercise of power "via the interaction of character. And this is where Barnes disappoints: I can't remember reading a novel which showed so little interest in the politics of everyday relationships - or one, at any rate, which isolated them so ruthlessly from the speculative realm of 'ideas'". Coe found the "Parenthesis, or half-chapter" to be "both too florid and too cool at the same time", but concluded that, overall, "Readers of this novel will feel awed, I'm sure, by the range of its concerns, the thoroughness of its research, and the agility with which it covers its ground. But when there are such big themes at stake, the reader can get tired of being teased, however ever waggishly. It's like finally going to bed with the partner of your dreams and then, instead of making love, being given a jolly good tickle".

Writing in The New York Times, Joyce Carol Oates began by noting, "Post-modernist in conception but accessibly straightforward in execution, Julian Barnes's fifth book is neither the novel it is presented as being nor the breezy pop-history of the world its title suggests. Influenced to varying degrees by such 20th-century presences as the inevitable Borges, Calvino and Nabokov, as well as by Roland Barthes and perhaps Michel Tournier among others, A History of the World in 10 1/2 Chapters is most usefully described as a gathering of prose pieces, some fiction, others rather like essays". She found his "concerns throughout are abstract and philosophical, though his tone is unpretentious [...]. Very like Borges, Julian Barnes has a predilection for tracing leitmotifs through a variety of metamorphoses". For Oates, "Given the principle of repetition, of permutations and combinations, it is inevitable that some of Mr. Barnes's prose pieces are more successful than others.[...] the second piece, The Visitors, [...] is wholly unbelievable, and the head terrorist speaks a stagey, mock-Hollywood lingo". "But", she wrote, "as A History of the World in 10 1/2 Chapters progresses and leitmotifs recur, often in comically ingenious combinations, the book becomes increasingly engaging and entertaining; and [...] the book attains that genial mastery of tone that characterized Flaubert's Parrot." Oates concluded by writing, "A History of the World in 10 1/2 Chapters demystifies its subjects and renders them almost ordinary: 'Myth will become reality, however sceptical we might be.' In so doing it deconstructs, perhaps even mocks, its own ambition. If the reader does not come to the book with certain of the expectations of prose fiction - that ideas will be dramatized with such narrative momentum that one forgets they are 'ideas,' and that complete worlds will be evoked by way of prose, not merely discussed - this is a playful, witty and entertaining gathering of conjectures by a man to whom ideas are quite clearly crucial: a quintessential humanist, it would seem, of the pre-post-modernist species".

For D. J. Taylor, writing in The Spectator, "[...] A History of the World in 10 1/2 Chapters is not a novel, according to the staider definitions; it possesses no character who rises above the level of a cipher and no plot worth speaking of. It is sharp, funny and brilliant without suggesting that this sharpness, humour and brilliance is sufficient to carry through its purpose to any satisfactory conclusion. Yet it is a significant novel, if only because it provides an inventory of the hoops through which the contemporary novelist has to jump if he wants to be taken seriously". He went on to claim that "there exists a whole pack of modern writers who delight in giving the game away, in telling you that they are making it up, in indulging in outrageous manipulations of character and plot. The result is that hardly anyone in these novels — brilliant novels, swimming with lively conceits — has that most necessary fictional quality, a life of their own" and that "A History is another of these newfangled romps, a series of neat, artfully stage-managed stories which combine to create a bizarre, off-centre view of world history". In the end, he decided, "This is an entertaining book, containing any number of sparkling jokes, but to suggest, as one or two people have begun to suggest, that it pushes back some sort of fictional frontier would be a mistake. [...] Like a great deal of theoretical literary criticism — to which it bears a strong resemblance — A History expends vast ingenuity on proving something that might be regarded as an axiom. Tous les significations sont arbitraires, ["all significations are arbitrary"] as a French theorist once put it. Well, we knew that".
