= Edward Pygge =

Pseudonym

Edward Pygge was a pseudonym used by Ian Hamilton, John Fuller, Clive James, Russell Davies, and Julian Barnes.

Hamilton invented the name, and he and James used it for satirical poems attacking current poetic fashions in Hamilton's influential literary magazine The Review. Davies also wrote poems and performed work using the name at a one-night show at the ICA in the Mall, unofficially called The Edward Pygge Revue. John Fuller and Colin Falck also wrote one or two pieces as Pygge for The Review.

Pygge made it to two double-page spreads in the New Statesman and there inspired contributors to their poetry competition wanting to submit a spoof; thus Edwina Pygge, Kedward Pygge and Hedwig Pygge.

Later, in Hamilton's next magazine, The New Review, Barnes also wrote a column under the name. The name also appeared in a 2003 BBC World Book Club programme discussing Barnes' 1984 novel, Flaubert's Parrot, when the presenter, Harriett Gilbert, read a question telephoned in by an "Edward Pygge."

== Works ==
- The Wasted Land (a parody of T. S. Eliot's The Waste Land) by James, first published under the name Pygge, is reprinted in James' collection The Book of My Enemy.
