= Dr. Pozzi at Home =

Painting by John Singer Sargent

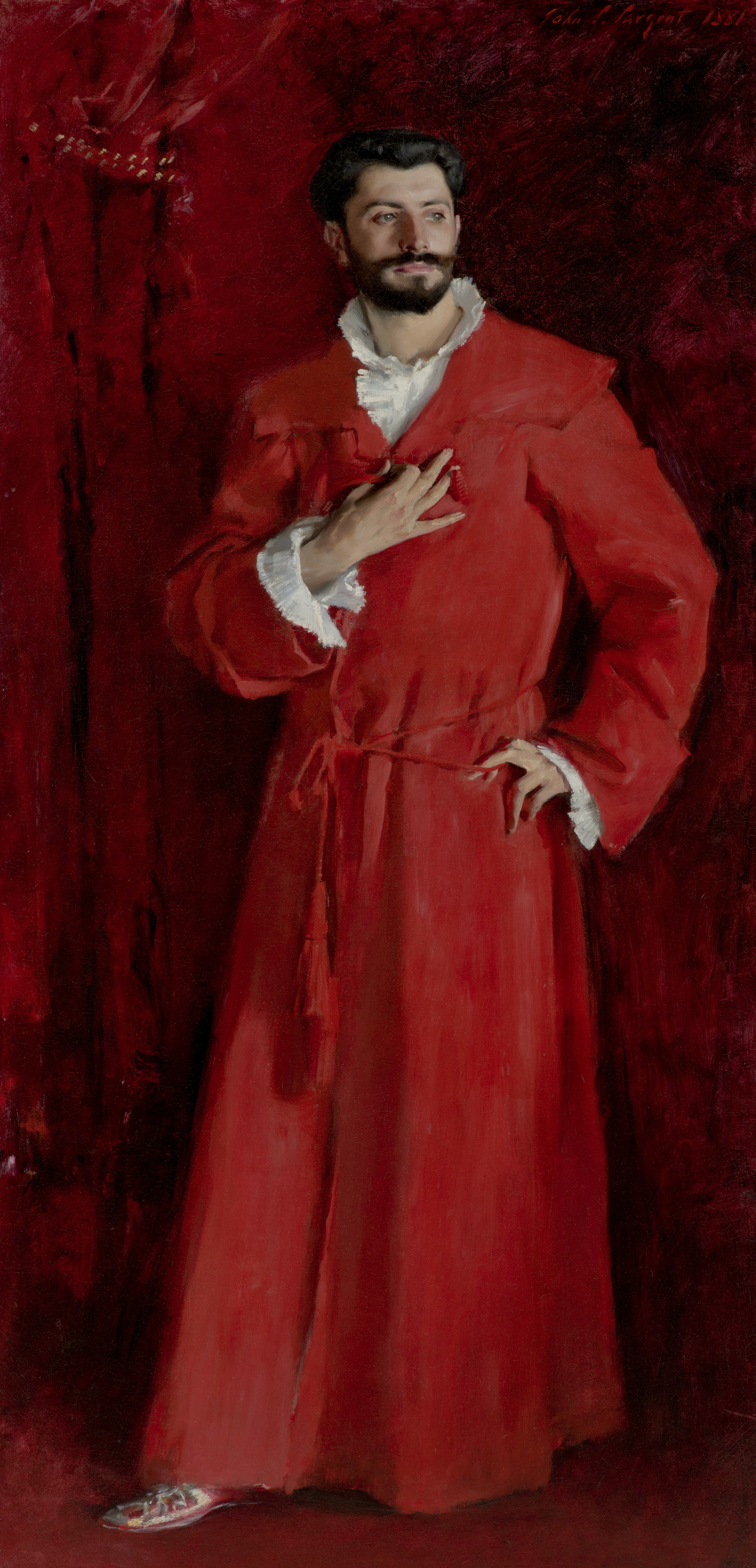
- Artist: John Singer Sargent
- Year: 1881
- Medium: Oil on canvas
- Dimensions: 201.6 cm × 102.2 cm (79.4 in × 40.2 in)
- Location: Hammer Museum, Los Angeles

Dr Pozzi at Home is an 1881 oil painting by the American artist John Singer Sargent. The portrait of the French gynaecologist and art collector Samuel Jean de Pozzi was Sargent's first large portrait of a male subject: it measures 201.6 cm × 102.2 cm (6 ft 7.4 in × 3 ft 4.2 in). It was the first work that Sargent exhibited at the Royal Academy in London. It was acquired by Armand Hammer in 1967, and has been held by the Hammer Museum in Los Angeles since 1991.

== Appearance ==
The aesthetic and charismatic Dr Pozzi was painted around the age of 35, but the composition departs markedly from the usual formal academic portraits of medical doctors in sombre professional clothing. Pozzi is depicted standing informally "at home", dressed in a voluminous full-length bright scarlet robe de chambre, tied with a red cord at the waist with provocatively dangling tassel. His robe is reminiscent of a monastic habit, and recalls Renaissance portraits of Catholic popes and cardinals, but also resembles a woman's full-length tea gown. He is standing back on his left leg, with his head also turned to his left; his right foot is poking out from the hem of his robe, shod in a red slipper with white embroidery. The intense red colour is repeated in the floor covering and the velvet curtains in the background, also gathered with a cord. The dominant colour may be a reference to the blood of his patients spilled in his professional activities as a surgeon, against which the hands and face of the bearded young doctor stand out, and the white ruffles of his shirt peeking out at the neck and wrists.

The long elegant fingers of Pozzi's hands are clearly depicted, the right hand clasping a closure at his breast and the left loosening the cord at his left hip. The attention paid to his hands compliments his surgical skill, but also alludes to the sensuality of man who insisted on performing intimate manual examinations of his female patients. At the time the painting was made, his watery eyes and mottled knuckles could have been intended to imply he was suffering from neurasthenia.

Sargent chose not to exhibit his larger-than-life-size portrait of Pozzi in Paris, perhaps to protect Pozzi's reputation: it was first exhibited at the Royal Academy's Summer Exhibition of 1882 in London under the title A Portrait, and then at the first Les XX exhibition in Brussels in 1884. It was the first of his works to be exhibited in London, before he moved there in 1884 following the scandal caused in Paris by his sensuous Portrait of Madame X.

== Owners ==
The portrait was retained by Dr Pozzi until his death in 1918, and then kept by his widow and later inherited by his son, Jean Pozzi. It was acquired by Armand Hammer after Jean's death in 1967; and after Hammer's death in 1990, the painting was transferred to the Hammer Museum in Los Angeles in 1991.

An exhibition which included the painting in 2015, at the National Portrait Gallery, London and later that year at the Metropolitan Museum of Art in New York, was the trigger for the 2019 book by Julian Barnes, The Man in the Red Coat.

== Gallery ==
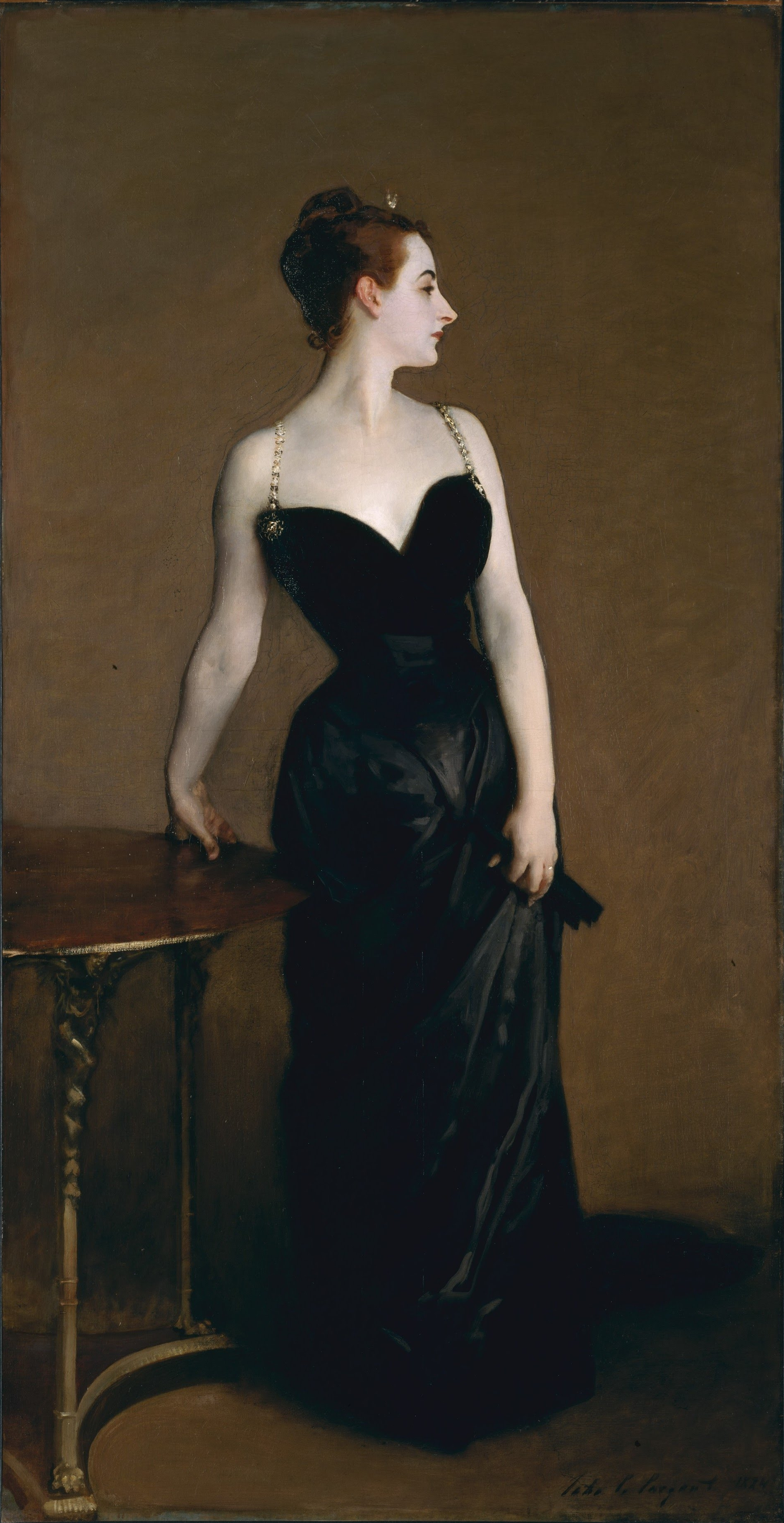
John Singer Sargent, Portrait of Madame X, 1884, Metropolitan Museum of Art

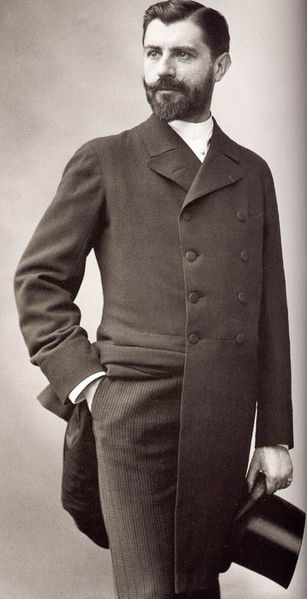
Contemporaneous photograph of Pozzi in more formal attire, by Paul Nadar

== See also ==
- List of works by John Singer Sargent
