= The Porcupine =

1992 novel by Julian Barnes

- First UK edition
- Author: Julian Barnes
- Language: English
- Genre: novel, political novel
- Publisher: Jonathan Cape
- Publication date: 1992
- Publication place: United Kingdom
- Media type: Print (Hardback & Paperback)
- Pages: 138 pp
- ISBN: 0-224-03618-1
- Preceded by: Talking It Over 1991
- Followed by: Cross Channel 1996

The Porcupine is a short novel by Julian Barnes originally published in 1992. Before its British release date the book was first published earlier that year in Bulgarian, with the title Бодливо свинче (Bodlivo Svinche, meaning Porcupine in Bulgarian) by Obsidian of Sofia.

== Synopsis ==
Set in a post-communist fictional country, likely based on Bulgaria, the novel concerns the trial of Stoyo Petkanov, a character judged to be loosely based on Todor Zhivkov, the former communist leader of Bulgaria. As the newly appointed Prosecutor General attempts to ensnare the former dictator with his own totalitarian laws, Petkanov springs a few unwelcome surprises on the court by conducting a formidable defense.

The Times described the book as 'Superbly humane in its moral concerns...an excellent novel'.
