= Metroland (film) =

- Theatrical release poster
- Directed by: Philip Saville
- Screenplay by: Adrian Hodges
- Based on: Metroland by Julian Barnes
- Produced by: Andrew Bendel
- Starring: Christian Bale; Emily Watson; Lee Ross; Elsa Zylberstein
- Cinematography: Jean-François Robin
- Edited by: Greg Miller
- Music by: Mark Knopfler
- Production companies: Arts Council England; Blue Horizon Productions
- Distributed by: Metrodome Distribution
- Release dates: 30 August 1997 (Venice); 21 August 1998 (UK)
- Running time: 105 minutes
- Country: United Kingdom
- Language: English
- Box office: $109,342 (Canada/USA/UK)

Metroland is a 1997 British comedy-drama film directed by Philip Saville and starring Christian Bale and Emily Watson. Written by Adrian Hodges, based on the 1980 novel Metroland by Julian Barnes, the film is about a man whose tranquil and ordinary life is disrupted by the sudden reappearance of his best friend, which leads him to remember his rebellious youth in Paris, to question some of his life choices, and to re-evaluate his priorities and marriage.

== Plot ==
In 1977, Chris (Christian Bale) and Marion (Emily Watson) are leading a peaceful married life with their child in Eastwood in the London suburbs known as Metro-land, the staid commuter region at the end of the London Underground's Metropolitan line. Their stagnant life is disrupted by an early morning phone call from Chris's childhood friend Toni (Lee Ross), who's returned to England after several years travelling through Africa, Europe and the United States as a bohemian poet. Years before, the two shared a dream of escaping boring suburban existence to live in avant-garde splendour in Paris. Toni's return sparks memories in Chris about their wild days in Paris in the late 1960s.

Disillusioned with the life he's chosen—having abandoned his youthful passion for photography for a steady job as a London banker—Chris takes long walks at night, making lists in his head of things for which he should feel grateful. Feeling that something is missing in his life, Chris sees in Toni the person he could have become—a free spirit living a vagabond's existence without worries or responsibilities. Toni outspokenly criticises Chris for his acceptance of a middle class life, a mortgage and a nine-to-five job. One night, Chris goes to a punk rock club with Toni who gets him stoned on cannabis. Envious of his friend, Chris begs Toni to reveal his secret for happiness and Toni responds that it's doing what you want, not what others want.

With his dull and tranquil marriage, Chris increasingly obsesses on the past. He rediscovers naked pictures of his former French girlfriend, Annick (Elsa Zylberstein), and in the coming days he thinks back to 1968 when they were in Paris. He remembers taking on the persona of a French beatnik with a hatred for all things English. His French fantasy was interrupted when he met Marion, who was on holiday in Paris with some friends. Taken aback by this educated and strait-laced Englishwoman, Chris began spending time with her, telling her about Annick and his conflicting feelings towards England. Unimpressed with his unrealistic dreams, Marion informed him that eventually he'd get married because he was "not original enough" to avoid marriage and a conventional future. When Annick learned about his friendship with the Englishwoman, she broke off their relationship.

Back in the present, Chris is unable to get over the feeling that he has surrendered his youth and ideals to a life he once swore he'd never lead. One night he attends a party at Toni's girlfriend's house, arriving without his wife. There he hears Toni casually mentioning that his girlfriend just had an abortion, then sees him flirting with another woman at the party—doing what he wants to do. Later, Chris meets a beautiful woman, Joanna (Amanda Ryan), who invites him to sleep with her. After learning that Toni in fact asked her to sleep with his friend as a way of ruining his marriage, Chris rejects the offer and returns home to Marion.

The next day, Chris comes home from work and finds Toni in the house with Marion. Toni hints that he and Marion had sex and the two friends get into a fight in the garden. Later, Marion tells him that Toni tried it on and that she rejected him. She tells him that despite all of his talk, Toni is really only jealous of Chris and the life he leads. The next day, Toni shows up at Chris' house to say goodbye before headed to Malibu, where he intends to do some screenwriting. He tries to tempt Chris into leaving his life behind and come with him, but Chris refuses, admitting, "I like my life; I'm content." That night, while Chris is on one of his walks, Marion approaches and asks what he'd put on the list for "happy." Chris responds, "Happy—if not now, never."

== Cast ==
- Christian Bale as Chris Lloyd
- Emily Watson as Marion Lloyd
- Lee Ross as Toni Barbarowski
- Elsa Zylberstein as Annick
- John Wood as The Retired Commuter
- Rufus as Henri
- Amanda Ryan as Joanna
- Jonathan Aris as Dave
- Ifan Meredith as Mickey
- Boris Terral as Jacques
- Lucy Speed as Punk Girl
- Bill Thomas as Middle-Aged Commuter
- Bethan Fairbairn as Amy Lloyd
- Daisy Fairbairn as Amy Lloyd

== Production ==
=== Theme ===
Metroland explores the tension between the youthful idealism of a hedonistic existence and that of middle-class establishment. The film title refers to the London suburbs which are served by the expansive London Underground network, an environment that Chris and Toni had always promised themselves they would escape. The narrative format is largely the flashback, with extended portions showing Chris as a 21-year-old living in Paris.

=== Screenplay ===
The screenplay was written by Adrian Hodges, based on the novel Metroland by Julian Barnes. The primary difference between film and the novel is the narrative structure: the book proceeds chronologically from Chris' youth to the early years of his marriage; the film uses flashbacks to his time in Paris. In the book, Chris is a post-graduate student while in Paris; in the film, he is a photographer. Finally, in the book, Chris' encounter with another woman at a party was not arranged by Toni, nor is there any indication that Toni has made a pass at Chris' wife Marion. Much of the dialogue from the book is preserved in the film.

=== Filming locations ===
Metroland was filmed on location in Amersham, London and Uxbridge in England and in Paris. Studio filming was done at Twickenham Film Studios in Middlesex, England.

=== Soundtrack ===
Mark Knopfler wrote the score and produced the Metroland soundtrack, which is supplemented by some additional tracks appropriate to the period depicted in the film.

The executive producer Andrew Bendel and director Philip Saville needed three songs from the punk era to be included in the live band scenes played by a fictitious group called The Subverts. Danny de Matos and Del Bartle were asked to write the songs to be included in the film. These three particular songs featured in the film (although not included on the Polygram soundtrack) "Amerikkka We Hate You", "Destroy the Hoi Polloi" and "You Destiny" were also produced by Danny de Matos.

== Reception ==
In his review for Variety magazine, David Rooney called the film "sexy and entertaining" with a "witty script and strong performances". Rooney concluded:

The flashback scheme taking in the Paris period and Chris and Toni's early-'60s schooldays is very structured and straightforward, and the observations about fidelity, commitment and compromise are far from new. But screenwriter Adrian Hodges' clever dialogue and director Saville's unpretentious approach make this a more satisfying experience than its narrow scope would indicate.

In his review for Entertainment Weekly, Owen Gleiberman gave the film an A− score, calling it "a no-fuss movie that casts a rich, tranquil spell." Gleiberman concluded, "It's the rare portrait of a happy marriage that is honest about the complex currents of desire, and the drama is beautifully played by Bale, who gawks with soulful sweetness, and Watson, who does her most piercing work since Breaking the Waves."

In his review for the Chicago Sun-Times, Roger Ebert gave the film three out of four stars, noting director Philip Saville ability to tell this "straightforward story of life choices" while avoiding a dependence on sentiment. Commenting on the lead character's memories of his past and his choices, Ebert writes:

The memories are often about the two women he met in Paris that year—the one he married, and the one he didn't. Annick (Elsa Zylberstein) is one of those young Parisians who live on air and use the cafes as living rooms. They meet, they flirt, they become a couple. The soundtrack of their romance is '60s rock, mixed with Django Reinhardt, and with Annick he learns about sex ("Is it the first time?" she asks, with reason). Then into his world drifts a visiting English girl, Marion (Emily Watson), who is sensible, cheerful, supportive, reassuring and wholesome. She sizes him up and informs him that he will get married, probably to her, because "you're not original enough not to." He does, and life in Metroland continues happily until Toni calls at 6 a.m. one morning. Toni tempts Chris with tastes of the life he left behind, and at a party they attend, an available girl makes him an offer so frank and inviting he very nearly cannot refuse. Yet the movie is not about whether Chris will remain faithful to Marion; it's about whether he chose the right life in the first place.

Rotten Tomatoes gives Metroland a rating of 64% from 28 reviews.

The film grossed $82,660 in the United Kingdom and $26,682 in the United States.
