= Elizabeth Finch =

Elizabeth Finch may refer to:

- Elizabeth Younger (1699–1762), married name Elizabeth Finch, actress
- Elizabeth Finch, 1st Countess of Winchilsea (1556–1634), English peeress
- Elizabeth Finch (novel), a 2022 novel by Julian Barnes

== See also ==
- Elisabeth R. Finch, American TV writer
