= Departure(s) =

2026 novel by Julian Barnes

- First edition
- Author: Julian Barnes
- Language: English
- Genre: Fiction
- Publisher: Jonathan Cape
- Publication date: 20 January 2026
- Publication place: United Kingdom
- Media type: Print
- Pages: 176
- ISBN: 978-1-78733-572-1
- Preceded by: Elizabeth Finch

Departure(s) is a novel by British writer Julian Barnes. Released on 20 January 2026 to coincide with the writer's 80th birthday, the book was published almost simultaneously in several major markets, including the United Kingdom, the United States, Canada, and Russia, among others. This is Barnes's 15th novel and, according to him, his last.

== Structure and synopsis ==
Blending fiction, memoir, and essay, it is narrated by a writer named Julian. Julian, living in north London and grappling with blood cancer, reflects on the loss of his wife to a brain tumour. His story focuses on a love affair between two of his college friends, whom he originally introduced. After parting ways as students, the couple rekindle their relationship decades later.

== Reception ==
Since Barnes called the novel his final work of fiction, most critics focused their reviews on this fact. Dinah Birch (The Times Literary Supplement) called Departure(s) "a final withdrawal from conventional categories of writing," noting the ambiguity of its genre; the book contains elements of both a novel ("It isn't quite a novel, though it does incorporate the vividly conceived germ of a story — "a story within a story") and autofiction, but is neither fully one nor the other. Birch also praised Barnes for his reflections on the unreliable functions of memory, the construction of the self, the limits of autonomy, noting primarily the influence of and references to Proust, as well as Virginia Woolf, Charles Baudelaire, Théophile Gautier, and Gustave Flaubert — "these disparate elements are bound together by the skillful management of theme and tone."
