= Maria Theresia von Paradis =

Austrian musician and composer (1759–1824)

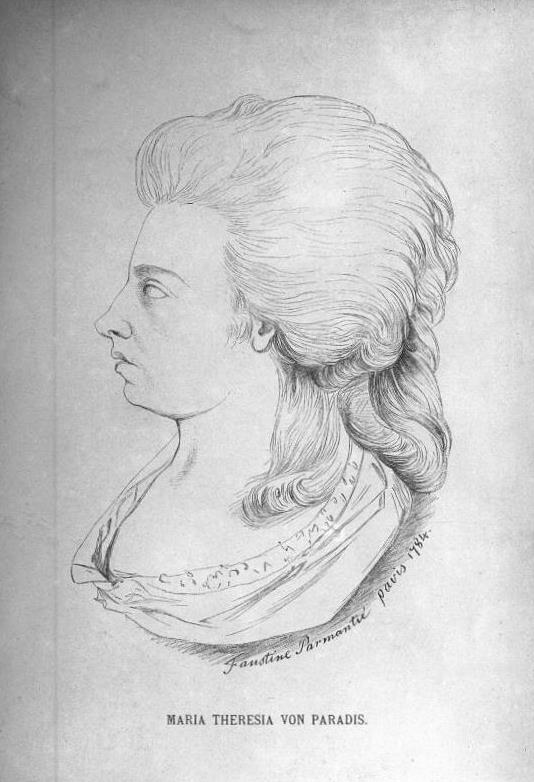
Portrait drawing of Paradis

Maria Theresia Paradis (May 15, 1759 – February 1, 1824) was an Austrian musician and composer who lost her sight at an early age, and for whom her close friend Mozart may have written his Piano Concerto No. 18 in B♭ major. She was also in contact with Salieri, Haydn, and Gluck.

== Early life ==
Maria Theresia Paradis was the daughter of Joseph Anton Paradis, Imperial Secretary of Commerce and Court Councilor to the Empress Maria Theresa, for whom she was named. The Empress, however, was not her godmother, as was often believed. Between the ages of 2 and 5 she lost her eyesight.

She received a broad education in the musical arts from:

- Karl Frieberth (music theory and composition)
- Leopold Kozeluch (piano)
- Vincenzo Righini (singing)
- Antonio Salieri (singing and composition)
- Abbé Vogler (music theory and composition).

By all accounts, Paradis had an excellent memory and exceptionally accurate hearing, as she was widely reported to have learned over sixty concertos by heart, as well as a large repertoire of solo and religious works.

In 1773 she was commissioned to perform an organ concerto by Antonio Salieri which survives but without its second movement.

By 1775, Paradis was performing as a singer and pianist in various Viennese salons and concerts.

Paradis was treated from late 1776 until the middle of 1777 by the famous Franz Anton Mesmer, who was able to improve on her blindness temporarily until she was removed from his care, amid concerns on the one hand of possible scandal, on the other hand at the potential loss of her disability pension. In any case, on her departure from Dr. Mesmer the blindness came back permanently.

== Touring Europe ==
Paradis did not stay confined to Vienna. In 1783, she set out on an extended tour towards Paris and London, accompanied by her mother and librettist Johann Riedinger who invented a composition board for her. In August of that year they visited the Mozarts in Salzburg, though Nannerl's diary seems to place this meeting in September. She played in Frankfurt and other German cities, then Switzerland. Paradis finally reached Paris in March 1784. Her first concert there was given in April at the Concert Spirituel; the review in the Journal de Paris for it remarked: "...one must have heard her to form an idea of the touch, the precision, the fluency and vividness of her playing." In all she made a total of 14 appearances in Paris, to excellent reviews and acclaim. She also assisted in helping Valentin Haüy ("the father and apostle of the blind") establish the first school for the blind, which opened in 1785.

Paradis performed a piano concerto by Joseph Haydn (HXVIII: 4), which may have premiered in Paris also in 1784, but it appears to have been composed in the 1770s, and the original manuscript is now lost.

Also in 1784 Paradis performed a piano concerto (probably No. 18, K.456) by Mozart. While K.456 is believed to be the concerto intended for Paradis, there are continuing doubts concerning this. Ruth Halliwell comments:

It is not certain which concerto this was. Leopold [in a letter from Vienna] simply described it to Nannerl as a ‘glorious concerto’ and said it had been written for Maria Theresia von Paradis ‘for Paris.’ His description suggests that neither he nor Nannerl knew it already; if this is so, it must have been a later one than K.453, which seems to have been the newest they had in Salzburg at this date.

Paradis traveled to Westminster in late 1784 and performed over the next few months at court, Carlton House (the town house of the Prince of Wales), and in the Professional Concerts at Hanover Square, Westminster, among other places. She played Handel fugues to George III and later accompanied the Prince of Wales, a cellist. However, her concerts were less well received and attended in England than in Paris. She continued to tour in Western Europe (including Hamburg where she met Carl Philipp Emanuel Bach), and after passing through Berlin and Prague, ended up back in Vienna in 1786. Further plans were made for her to give concerts in the Italian states and Russia, but nothing came of these. She returned to Prague in 1797 for the production of her opera Rinaldo und Alcina.

== Compositions and later life ==
During her tour of Europe, Paradis began composing solo music for piano as well as pieces for voice and keyboard. The earliest music attributed to her is often cited as a set of four piano sonatas from about 1777, but these are really by Pietro Domenico Paradisi, to whom much of her music is often mistakenly attributed. Her earliest major work in existence is the collection Zwölf Lieder auf ihrer Reise in Musik gesetzt, composed between 1784 and 1786.

By the year 1789, Paradis was spending more time with composition than performance, as shown by the fact that from 1789 to 1797 she composed five operas and three cantatas. After the failure of the opera Rinaldo und Alcina from 1797, she shifted her energy more and more to teaching. In 1808, she founded her own music school in Vienna, where she taught singing, piano and theory to young girls. A Sunday concert series at this school featured the work of her outstanding pupils. She continued to teach up until her death in 1824.

When composing, she used a composition board invented by Riedinger, and for correspondence the hand-printing machine invented by Wolfgang von Kempelen. Her songs are mostly representative of the operatic style, which displays coloratura and trills. Salieri's influence may be seen in the dramatically composed scenes. Much of the stage work is modeled on the Viennese Singspiel style, while her piano works show a great influence by her teacher Leopold Kozeluch.

=== Sicilienne ===
The most famous composition ascribed to Paradis, the Sicilienne in E♭ major for violin and piano is a musical hoax by a 20th Century violinist Samuel Dushkin. The piece is based on the Larghetto movement from Carl Maria von Weber's Violin Sonata in F major, Op. 10, No.1.

== List of works ==
=== Stage works ===
- Ariadne und Bacchus, melodrama, June 20, 1791 (lost)
- Der Schulkandidat, December 5, 1792, pt of Act 2 and all of Act 3 (Overture: ClarNan Editions; rest lost)
- Rinaldo und Alcina, Zauberoper, June 30, 1797 (lost)
- Große militärische Oper 1805 (lost)
- Zwei ländliche Opern (lost)

=== Cantatas ===
- Trauerkantate auf den Tod Leopolds II, 1792 (lost)
- Deutsches Monument Ludwigs des Unglücklichen, 1793
- Kantate auf die Wiedergenesung meines Vaters (lost)

=== Instrumental works ===
- Pianoforte Concerto in G (lost)
- Pianoforte Concerto in C (lost)
- 12 Piano Sonatas, 1792 (lost)
- Pianoforte Trio, 1800 (lost)
- Fantasie in G, pf, 1807
- Fantasie in C, pf, 1811
- Keyboard Variations (lost)
- An meine entfernten Lieben, pf (lost)
- Various songs and lieder totaling at least 18 works, of which two are lost.

== Scores ==
- Free scores by Maria Theresia von Paradis at the International Music Score Library Project (IMSLP)

== Cultural references ==
=== Novels and short stories ===
- Barnes, Julian. "Harmony" in Pulse, a collection of short stories by Julian Barnes. New York: Alfred A. Knopf, 2011.
- Halberstadt, Michèle. The Pianist in the Dark [Novel]. New York, Pegasus Books, 2011.
- O'Doherty, Brian. The Strange Case of Mademoiselle P.[Novel]. Vintage, London 1992, ISBN 0 09 922371 6.
- Walser, Alissa. Mesmerized [Novel]. London: MacLehose Press, 2012.
- Thuillier, Jean, "Franz Anton Mesmer ou L'extase Magnétique" [Biography/Novel]. Paris, Robert Laffont 1988.

=== Plays ===
- Stevens, Claudia. Playing Paradis 1994.

Video documentation, script, musical sketches and performance history, available in the Claudia Stevens papers, Special Collections, Earl Gregg Swem Library, College of William and Mary. A musically self-accompanied solo play in two acts, text and music by Claudia Stevens, concerns Maria Theresia's relation to Mesmer, and blindness as metaphor.

- Carol K. Mack. "Without a Trace" 1997.

=== Films ===
- Forman, Miloš, dir. Amadeus Warner Brothers, 2002.

Paradis is mentioned in a scene during which Antonio Salieri reports to Emperor Joseph II Paradis's claim that she was molested by Mozart during a lesson. This claim, in the film's context, is ultimately portrayed as a ruse by Salieri to hinder Mozart's appointment to a court position as teacher to the Emperor's young niece.

- Spottiswoode, Roger. Mesmer. Image Entertainment, 2000.
- Mademoiselle Paradis by Barbara Albert

== See also ==
- Charlotta Seuerling
- Mélanie de Salignac

== Bibliography ==
- Adler, Guido, and Karl Friberth. Das Wiener Lied von 1778 bis Mozarts Tod. Score Anthology. Denkmäler der Tonkunst in Österreich 54, 1960.
- Angermüller, Rudolph. Antonio Salieri. Dokumente seines Lebens. 3 Bde. Bock, Bad Honnef, 2002. ISBN 9783870664954
- Borroff, Edith. "Women Composers: Reminiscence and History." College Music Symposium 15 (1975): 26-33.
- Bundes-Blindenerziehungsinstitut. 200 Jahre Blindenbildung im deutschen Sprachraum. Wien 2004, p. 56. ISBN 978-3-934471-57-3
- Frankl, Ludwig August. Maria Theresia von Paradis' Biographie. Linz: Verlag des oberoesterreichischen Privat-Blinden- Institutes, 1876.
- Fürst, Marion. Maria Theresia Paradis, Köln: Böhlau 2005 (ISBN 3-412-19505-7), Mozart-Jahrbuch 2007/2008, (Kassel: Bärenreiter, 2011) Archived review online
- Fürst, Marion. Maria Theresia Paradis - Mozarts berühmte Zeitgenossin. Böhlau, Köln, 2005. ISBN 9783412195052
- Gordy, Laura Ann. "Women Creating Music, 1750-1850: Marianne Martinez, Maria Theresia von Paradis, Fanny Mendelssohn Hensel, and Clara Wieck Schumann." D.M.A. thesis, University of Alabama, 1987.
- Halliwell, Ruth. The Mozart Family: Four Lives in a Social Context. Clarendon Press, Oxford, 1998. ISBN 9780198163718
- Jezic, Diane, and Elizabeth Wood. Women Composer: The Lost Tradition Found. New York: The Feminist Press at the City University of New York. ISBN 9781558610743
- Matsushita, Hidemi. "The Musical Career and Compositions of Maria Theresia von Paradis." Ph.D. dissertation, Brigham Young University, 1989.
- Maxwell, Andrea. "Maria Theresia von Paradis." Helicon Nine 1, no. 2 (Fall-Winter 1979): 54-57.
- McCann, Michelle Roehm, and Amelie Welden. Girls Who Rocked the World: Heroines from Joan of Arc to Mother Teresa. New York: Aladdin, 2012. ISBN 978-1582703619
- Mell, Alexander. Encyklopädisches Handbuch des Blindenwesens Verlag von A. Pichlers Witwe und Sohn, Wien, Leipzig, 1900, Pp. 576-578.
- Nicholas, Jeremy. "The Forgotten Artists." International Piano #16 (Nov-Dec 2012): 36-39.
- Purtscher, Nora. Doctor Mesmer: An Historical Study. London: Westhouse, 1947.
- Sadie, Stanley, ed.The New Grove Dictionary of Music and Musicians. (2. Edition) Grove Dictionaries, New York, 2000.
- Schleifer, Martha Furman, and Sylvia Glickman. Women Composers: Music through the Ages. Score Anthology. New York: G. K. Hall, 1996–. ISBN 978-0783816128
