= Cross channel =

Cross Channel may refer to:

- Cross channel (marketing), transmission of content through various media in marketing and interaction design
- Cross-Channel guns in the Second World War, coastal artillery pieces placed on the English Channel coasts
- HVDC Cross-Channel, electric connection that operates under the English Channel
- Crossings of the English Channel, by various means

== Entertainment ==
- Cross Channel (short story collection), 1996 collection of short stories by Julian Barnes
- Cross Channel (film), 1955 film
- Cross Channel (video game), a 2003 Japanese adult visual novel

== See also ==
- Channel Crossing
