= Pulse (short story collection) =

Collection of writings by Julian Barnes

- First edition (UK)
- Author: Julian Barnes
- Cover artist: Suzanne Dean
- Language: English
- Publisher: Jonathan Cape (UK)
- Publication date: 6 Jan 2011
- Publication place: United Kingdom
- Media type: Print
- Pages: 240
- ISBN: 0-224-09108-5

Pulse is the third short story collection written by Julian Barnes.

== Stories ==
First publication in brackets

=== Part One ===
- "East Wind" (The New Yorker, 19 May 2008 online text) - In an Essex seaside town, Vernon, a divorced estate agent, begins an affair with Andrea an East German waitress, but then he pries into her past.
- "At Phil & Joanna's 1: 60/40" (The Guardian, 2 Aug 2008, online text)- A dinner party with a dialogue discussing attitudes towards smoking on both sides of the Atlantic.
- "Sleeping with John Updike" (The Guardian, 23 Jan 2010, online text) - Elderly authors Alice and Jane discuss their past lives and loves in the literary world.
- "At Phil & Joanna's 2: Marmalade" (Zoetrope: All Story) - Another dinner party, this time with dialogue considering the Britishness of marmalade.
- "Gardeners' World" - Ken and Martha have very different plans for the garden of their new house.
- "At Phil & Joanna's 3: Look, No Hands" - A discussion on the difference between men and women with regard to love.
- "Trespass" (The New Yorker, 24 Nov 2003, online text) - After breaking up with Cath, Geoff considers joining The Ramblers, but then he meets Lynn.
- "At Phil & Joanna's 4: One in Five" - On global warming.
- "Marriage Lines" (Granta, Feb 2008)- The narrator makes his first solo trip to a Hebridean island following the death of his wife.

=== Part Two ===
Contains five stories, concerning the senses

- "The Limner" (The New Yorker, 5 Jan 2009, online text) - Mr. Wadsworth is a deaf travelling portrait artist whose latest commission is to paint a customs officer, Mr. Tuttle.
- "Complicity" (The New Yorker, 19 Oct 2009. online text) - A lawyer recalls the beginning of his relationship with a young doctor with many references to 'touch'.
- "Harmony" (Granta, 14 Jan 2010,) - Based on Mesmer's treatment of Maria Theresia Paradis for blindness.
- "Carcassonne" (The Spectator online text) uses the relationship between Garibaldi and Anita Riberas as a basis for discussion on 'taste' in its widest sense.
- "Pulse" - the narrator's father suffers from anosmia, then his mother is diagnosed with motor neuron disease, both illnesses playing out alongside the narrator's deteriorating relationship with his wife.

== Reception ==
- Tim Martin in The Telegraph writes, "the tone of this collection is darker than much of Barnes’s other work", "Julian Barnes shows his usual sharp dissection of the national character, but is also a deeply felt portrayal of grief", he concludes that this is a "quietly remarkable, elegant book".
- Leyla Sanai in The Independent also comments on the dark tone on the collection, arising from the death of Barnes' wife Pat Kavanagh in 2008: "The stories in Pulse reflect this tragedy, the majority of them being concerned with loss: the death of a spouse or a parent; divorce and its aftermath; the snuffing out of vital senses such as sight, hearing or taste; the crumbling of friable new relationships; the straining to snapping point of false expedient "friendships". She continues "The least successful stories are a sequence about middle-class dinner parties, rendered largely in dialogue....Still, there's no shortage of that elsewhere in this collection, which combines mordant humour, perspicacity and invigoratingly crisp writing".
- Michiko Kakutani writing in The New York Times also feels the collection is patchy: "Mr. Barnes’s latest collection, “Pulse,” is filled with both gems and should-have-been discards. The title story and “Marriage Lines” are beautiful, elegiac tales about how marriages endure or change over time: stories that attest to the new emotional depth Mr. Barnes discovered in his 2004 collection “The Lemon Table.” Unfortunately, many other entries in this volume are brittle exercises in craft: a writer writing on automatic pilot, substituting verbal facility for genuine humor or real feeling, a scattering of social details for a persuasive sense of time and place."
