= The Man in the Red Coat =

2019 book by Julian Barnes

- First edition
- Author: Julian Barnes
- Publisher: Jonathan Cape
- Publication date: 11 November 2019
- Publication place: United Kingdom
- ISBN: 978-1-78733-216-4

The Man in the Red Coat is a book by Julian Barnes. It was published on 11 November 2019. The book concerns Samuel Jean de Pozzi, a French surgeon and pioneer in the field of gynaecology whose portrait in a red coat John Singer Sargent painted, and other rich and cultivated people of Belle Époque Paris, among them Robert de Montesquiou, Prince Edmond de Polignac, Jean Lorrain, Marcel Proust, Reynaldo Hahn, Sarah Bernhardt, Joris-Karl Huysmans and Oscar Wilde.
