= England, England =

1998 novel by Julian Barnes

- First edition cover
- Author: Julian Barnes
- Cover artist: Bill Gregory
- Genre: Satire, farce
- Publisher: Jonathan Cape
- Publication date: 27 August 1998
- Media type: Hardcover
- Pages: 272
- ISBN: 0-224-05275-6

England, England is a satirical postmodern novel by Julian Barnes, published and shortlisted for the Booker Prize in 1998. While researchers have also pointed out the novel's characteristic dystopian and farcical elements, Barnes himself described the novel as a "semi-farce".

== Plot summary ==
England, England is divided into three parts entitled "England", "England, England" and "Anglia". The first part focuses on the protagonist Martha Cochrane and her childhood memories. Growing up in the surrounding of the English countryside, her peaceful childhood is disrupted when her father leaves the family. Martha's memories of her father are closely related to playing a Counties of England jigsaw puzzle with him.

The second part, "England, England", is set in the near future. Martha is now in her forties and is employed by the entrepreneur Sir Jack Pitman for a megalomaniacal project: Sir Jack aims to turn the Isle of Wight into a gigantic theme park which contains everything that people, especially tourists, consider to be quintessentially English, selected according to what Sir Jack himself approves of. The theme park − called "England, England" − thus becomes a replica of England's best known historical buildings, figures and sites. Popular English tourist attractions and icons of "Englishness" are crammed together to be easily accessible without having to travel the whole of "real" England.

While working on the set-up of the project, Martha starts an affair with one of her colleagues, Paul Harrison. They discover Sir Jack's adult baby fetish and blackmail him with incriminating evidence when Sir Jack wants to dismiss Martha. She thus becomes CEO of the Island project, which turns out to be a highly popular tourist attraction. As a consequence of the huge success, "England, England" becomes an independent state and part of the European Union, while the real, "Old England" suffers a severe decline and increasingly falls into international irrelevance. After a major scandal in the theme park, however, Martha is eventually expelled from the island.

The third part of the novel, "Anglia", renamed "Albion" in later editions, is set decades later and depicts Martha who has returned to a village in Old England after many years of wandering abroad. The original nation has regressed into a vastly de-populated, agrarian and pre-industrial state without any international political influence, while "England, England" continues to prosper.

== Themes ==
Beyond the basic twin plots surrounding Pitman and Cochrane, England, England is a novel of ideas – mainly ideas that correspond to the criticism of society voiced by French philosophers of the second half of the 20th century. The seminal work in this respect is Jean Baudrillard's (b. 1929) L'échange symbolique et la mort (1976), in which Baudrillard claims that in the course of the 20th century reality has been superseded by "simulacra", by representations of the original which – in a world where technology has developed the means to replicate each and everything, including works of art (cf. Walter Benjamin's 1936 essay "Das Kunstwerk im Zeitalter seiner technischen Reproduzierbarkeit") and humans (by means of cloning) – acquire an independent and increasingly higher status than the original: because they are safer, easier to handle, more cost-effective, ubiquitous and thus more easily accessible, renewable, and predictable. (Cf. "postmodernism" and also US sociologist George Ritzer's "McDonaldization" thesis of the 1990s, in particular his discussion of tourism).

This is exactly the purpose of Pitman's final project: he wants his island to epitomise everything that is truly English. As a fervent patriot, he wants to put England in a nutshell for all the world to see and to cash in on England at the same time: he does not mind that the real thing takes a turn for the worse and eventually deteriorates.

The two strands of action – Martha Cochrane's rise to fame and her subsequent downfall on the one hand and the launching of the project and its continuing success on the other – are intertwined when Martha applies for a job as Special Consultant in Pitman's personal staff, which she gets. Martha has acquired all the professional skills necessary to succeed in our post-industrialist society, yet she has retained from her childhood at least some of her emotional and sentimental inclinations. Although she has become scheming, calculating and ruthless in her professional life, she is still able, at times, to listen to her heart – especially in her relationship with Paul Harrison, the "Ideas Catcher". This ability of hers also helps her cope with old age back in rural Anglia.

By having his characters uninhibitedly subvert all of England's long-standing customs and traditions, Barnes inadvertently also collects, registers and critically assesses these myths. For the sake of simplification, however, in the novel old English folklore, customs and legends, but also historical facts, are altered to fit the overall purpose of the Project. As the whole island is supposed to be fit for family consumption, history has to be rewritten and bowdlerised (to pay lip service to political correctness and avoid sexual harassment actions). As they are paying high prices, mainly in advance, the visitors to the island are supposed never to be faced with anything incomprehensible or illogical because that would spoil the fun for them and could even give rise to complaints.

The majority of attractions of England, England enjoy great popularity. For example, tourists are fascinated by the artificially recreated London "pea soup" fog or by a re-enactment of the Battle of Britain. Visitors also like watching the King, nicknamed "Kingy-Thingy" by his wife, who is still a Windsor; but after the death of Elizabeth II the strict line of succession has been abandoned. Both the King and his Queen enjoy having affairs with other people, and their escapades are regularly exposed by the tabloid papers. Pitman persuades the King to move permanently to the Isle of Wight, where his only duty is to appear regularly on the balcony of a half-size replica (but with double glazing) of Buckingham Palace for the paying visitors to see. Special script-writers have been hired for him and Queen Denise for the rare instances where they are allowed to say something.

However, because the actors sooner or later over-identify with their roles, some of the other attractions go terribly wrong. Robin Hood and his band actually start hunting their own food in the Island's heritage parks and old-English farmyards; the smugglers really start smuggling (cf. Adam Smith's approval of smuggling); and the "Samuel Johnson Dining Experience" turns out to be a flop because Doctor Johnson is regularly rude to the guests who dine at his table.
