= Before She Met Me =

1982 novel by Julian Barnes

- First edition
- Author: Julian Barnes
- Language: English
- Publisher: Jonathan Cape
- Publication date: 1982
- Publication place: United Kingdom
- Media type: Print (hardback & paperback)
- Pages: 183 pp
- ISBN: 0224019856

Before She Met Me is a novel by English writer Julian Barnes, first published in 1982 by Jonathan Cape. It is a black comedy which scrutinizes the awakening of sexual jealousy in a dull and otherwise sensible college lecturer.

== Overview ==
After fifteen years of marriage to a nagging woman who despises everything about him, Graham Hendrick files for divorce and marries Ann, a beautiful former actress and seemingly the woman of his dreams. Initially he believes this to be the start of the good life and congratulates himself. However, as he learns more about Ann's past, he starts to obsess over the time before he knew her, resenting her previous love affairs, apparently unable to accept that she enjoyed a life at all before they met.

As Graham imagines non-existent humiliations and concocts plans for revenge on previous lovers, his increasingly strange behaviour begins to alarm first his wife and then his friend Jack, whom he soon suspects of cuckolding him.
