= The Only Story =

2018 novel by Julian Barnes

- First edition
- Author: Julian Barnes
- Publisher: Jonathan Cape
- Publication date: 1 February 2018
- Publication place: United Kingdom
- ISBN: 978-1-78733-069-6

The Only Story is a novel by Julian Barnes. It is his thirteenth novel, and was published on 1 February 2018.

== Plot ==
The novel is the life story of Paul Roberts, who we first meet as a 19-year-old Sussex University undergraduate returning to his parents' house in the leafy southern suburbs of London (Sutton, in Surrey, is suggested as a model.) The time is the early sixties, and there are a few references to current events. Paul joins the tennis club, which is one of the few opportunities such places offer for socialising. In a random-draw mixed doubles, he is thrown together with Susan MacLeod, a 48-year-old married woman with two daughters older than Paul. Paul and Susan become lovers and she eventually leaves her family to set up house with Paul in South London. Having nothing to do but a little housekeeping, Susan soon descends into alcoholism and, years later, to dementia. Paul departs and embarks on foreign travels, picking up jobs and women at random.

As Paul narrates his life in this book, he freely admits that memory is unreliable and he may not be telling us the truth.

== Characters ==
- Paul Roberts, the protagonist
- Susan Macleod, the older woman who later becomes an alcoholic
- Gordon MacLeod, Susan's husband who she nicknames "Elephant pants"
- Martha and Clara MacLeod, Susan's daughters. Paul refers to them, respectively, as "Miss G." (Miss Grumpy) and "Miss N.S." (Miss Not So Grumpy)
- Joan, Susan's former tennis partner, a forlorn and cynical character whose ambition in life has been reduced to finding the cheapest bottle of gin within driving distance
- Eric, Paul's best friend from university
- Anna, a later girlfriend

== Major theme ==
Paul agonises about the nature of love, even going so far as to keep a notebook of sayings on the subject. He concludes that pain is an inevitable concomitant of love, and wonders if he'd have been happier if he'd loved less, and presumably therefore brought less pain on himself and Susan.

== Style ==
The book has no conventional chapters but is split into three parts, simply labelled "One, Two, Three". Part One is the boy-meets-woman narrative, told in the first person. Part Two, told in a mixture of first and second person, is the decline of the love affair, and Part Three is the rest of Paul's life told mostly in a mix of second and third person. In the last few pages, as Paul says his final goodbye to Susan, now sedated in a psychiatric hospital, he reverts to the first person.
