= Siegfried Lenz Prize =

German literary award

- Awarded for: international writers who have achieved recognition for their narrative work and whose creative work is close to the spirit of Siegfried Lenz
- Location: Hamburg
- Country: Germany
- Presented by: First Mayor of the Free and Hanseatic City of Hamburg
- Reward: €50,000
- First award: 2014
- Website: www.siegfriedlenz-stiftung.org/siegfried-lenz-preis/siegfried-lenz-preis/

The Siegfried Lenz Prize is intended to honor international writers who have achieved recognition for their narrative work and whose creative work is close to the spirit of Siegfried Lenz. The award is endowed with €50,000. The jury consists of five members. The award ceremony takes place in the Hamburg City Hall. The prize is presented every two years by the First Mayor of the Free and Hanseatic City of Hamburg and the Siegfried Lenz Foundation. Shortly before his death, Lenz set up a foundation in his name, which also awards the prize.

== Recipients ==
- 2014 Amos Oz
- 2016 Julian Barnes
- 2018 Richard Ford
- 2020 Lyudmila Ulitskaya
- 2022 Elizabeth Strout
- 2024 Claire Keegan
- 2026 Norbert Gstrein
