= The Lemon Table =

Book by Julian Barnes

- First edition (UK)
- Author: Julian Barnes
- Language: English
- Publisher: Jonathan Cape (UK)
- Publication date: 2004
- Publication place: United Kingdom
- Media type: Print
- Pages: 213
- ISBN: 0-224-07198-X

The Lemon Table is the second collection of short stories written by Julian Barnes, and has the general theme of old age. It was first published in 2004 by Jonathan Cape.

== Stories ==
First publication in brackets

- "A Short History of Hairdressing" (The New Yorker, 27 Sep 1997) - The story tells of three visits Gregory makes to a hairdressers, first as a child on his first visit without his mother, then as a young man having just broken up with his girlfriend, and finally in middle age having been married for 28 years.
- "The Story of Mats Israelson" (The New Yorker, 24 Jul 2000) - Tells of the unconsummated love affair in a small Swedish town between Anders Boden, a respected sawmill owner and Barbro Lindwall, the wife of a pharmacist new to the town.
- "The Things You Know" - Describes the monthly get-together for breakfast of elderly widows Janice and Merrill, as they reminisce about their lives and husbands, but leaving much unsaid.
- "Hygiene" (The New Yorker, 06 Sep 1999) - An elderly man visits London for his annual Regimental dinner but also to visit prostitute Babs whom he has been visiting for over twenty years.
- "The Revival" (The New Yorker, 05 Aug 1996) - A speculative account of Turgenev's last love affair with an actress 35 years his junior, who plays Verochka, a character in the revival of "A Month in the Country" a play Turgenev wrote 30 years earlier.
- "Vigilance" (The Times Literary Supplement, 04 Sep 1998) - An aficionado of classical music complains about the increasing misbehaviour amongst his fellow concert-goers and of the increasingly dramatic steps his vigilance requires as he seeks to reduce the level of noise in the audience around him.
- "Bark" - Jean-Etienne Delacour, former obsessive gourmand and gambler turns into an ascetic in order to outlive fellow investors in a tontine, avidly studying their mortality. His regimen includes eating a slice of bark each day.
- "Knowing French" - A series of letters written to Julian Barnes from Sylvia Winstanley, a lonely 81-year-old struggling to remain alert in a stifling old-peoples home.
- "Appetite" (Areté Magazine, Issue Two (Spring/Summer 2000)) - As Vivian's husband descends into the advanced stages of dementia she finds that reading recipes from his favourite cookery books elicit the safest responses; other sources can generate more unexpected results.
- "The Fruit Cage" (The New Yorker, 13 May 2002) - The narrator struggles to come to terms with his 81-year-old father's affair with Elsie, a woman in her sixties, and the abandonment of his mother. He visits Elsie and is told another side to his parents apparently placid marriage.
- "The Silence" (The Independent, 29 Dec 2001) - The musings of an elderly Sibelius as he struggles to complete his Eighth Symphony.

== Reception ==
Many reviews were positive :

- Thomas Mallon of The New York Times is full of praise:
  - "The Lemon Table has plenty of sharp, even cruel, comic pleasures"
  - "Barnes is a top-flight precisionist, often sectioning stories with space breaks and numerical divisions that give them a surprising amplitude"
  - "Stylistically, Barnes doesn't go in for bravura set pieces so much as the steady, pleasing wit of English comic realism, in which sheer intelligence and acute observation carry the whole production, line after line and page after page. The author's figurative language is consistently satisfying"
- Martin Rubin in the San Francisco Chronicle writes "Everywhere he ventures, Barnes is sure-footed: each word, each tone, each nuance of phrase is just right. Every word is the proverbial mot juste. Barnes is always adept at avoiding cliche. If some of the situations in the stories veer too close to that fatal shoal, he is sure to put in some unexpected touches"... "It is inevitable that not every tale in this collection is a masterpiece. Even those, however, that do not rise to this level are very well done"
- Frank Kermode writing in The Guardian praises the collection, "The Lemon Table leaves one in no doubt as to Barnes's virtuosity."

But there was some criticism :

- Carolyn See in The Washington Post wrote "These particular stories suffer from an overwhelming disadvantage (and I don't care if Julian Barnes is a very skillful writer and gets published in the New Yorker all the time). You can't condescend to your characters, scorn them even, and expect to leave the reader with much more than a bad taste. A little hauteur goes a very long way"
- Ruth Franklin, of The New Republic: "the proximity to gravitas serves only to pinpoint Barnes's inadequacies as a fiction writer. He dreams up some nicely unconventional figures and puts them in provocative scenarios, but he fails to discover any emotion richer than a condescending pathos."

== Publication history ==
- 2004, UK, Jonathan Cape, ISBN 0-224-07198-X, Pub date 03 Mar 2004, Hardback
- 2004, US, Alfred A. Knopf, ISBN 1-4000-4214-3, Pub date Jul 2004, Hardback
- 2004, Canada, Random House, ISBN 0-679-31303-6, Pub date 06 Jul 2004, Hardback
- 2004, UK, Chivers, ISBN 0-7540-9825-7, Pub date Dec 2004, Audio cassette, read by Prunella Scales and Timothy West
- 2005, UK, Picador, ISBN 0-330-43354-7, Pub date 04 Feb 2005, Paperback
- 2005, UK, Picador, ISBN 0-330-42692-3, Pub date 04 Feb 2005, Paperback
- 2005, US, Vintage, ISBN 1-4000-7650-1, Pub date 05 Apr 2005, Paperback
- 2005, Canada, Vintage, ISBN 0-679-31304-4, Pub date 05 Apr 2005, Paperback
- 2011, UK, Vintage, ISBN 0-09-955499-2, Pub date 06 Jan 2011, Paperback
