= The Noise of Time =

Novel by Julian Barnes

- First edition
- Author: Julian Barnes
- Cover artist: Vladimir Zimokov
- Publisher: Jonathan Cape
- Publication date: 2016
- Publication place: United Kingdom
- Media type: Print (Hardcover)

The Noise of Time is a 2016 historical novel by English author Julian Barnes. It concerns the life of Dmitri Shostakovich, a Russian composer under the dictatorships of Joseph Stalin and then Nikita Khrushchev.

== Content ==
The novel tells the life story of the Russian composer Dmitri Shostakovich. It explores the living and working conditions of an artist under a dictatorship, particularly during the Stalinist era.

The novel is divided into three parts. Each part presents a specific situation as a framework, providing the starting point for Shostakovich's memories and reflections:

The first part describes a situation from 1936: After Shostakovich's opera Lady Macbeth of Mtsensk is met with Joseph Stalin's disapproval and Shostakovich himself was declared an enemy of the people, he was also accused of being an accomplice in a conspiracy against Stalin. Shostakovich expected to be arrested every night by the secret police (NKVD officers). To spare his wife and young daughter from witnessing his death, he waited every night outside his apartment door for his arrest, which never came.

In the second part Shostakovich is returning from New York, where he attended a Soviet-American peace conference. He has been rehabilitated in the eyes of the Soviet leadership, but he had initially refused to attend the conference for fear of being co-opted by their state propaganda. He had no choice, however, and was even forced to officially distance himself from his earlier works and from composers he actually admired, but whose music contradicted the principles of socialist realism.

The third part recounts Shostakovich's later years during the era of Stalin's successor, Nikita Khrushchev. Now the most famous composer in his country, Shostakovich is driven through Moscow by his chauffeur. He accepts his numerous state awards and honours with a certain indifference. He reads speeches and signs newspaper articles written for him by others. His friends know his true feelings; to everyone else, however, he must appear to be a lackey of the Soviet government. He believes he has adapted too much to the system and consequently loses his self-respect. However, Shostakovich no longer experiences frequent suicidal thoughts, as he did in previous years.
