= Levels of Life =

2013 memoir by Julian Barnes

- First edition
- Author: Julian Barnes
- Language: English
- Genre: Memoir
- Publisher: Jonathan Cape
- Publication date: 2013
- Publication place: United Kingdom
- Media type: Print
- Pages: 118
- ISBN: 0-22-409815-2

Levels of Life is a 2013 memoir by English author Julian Barnes, dedicated to his wife Pat Kavanagh, a literary agent who died in 2008.

The book comprises three essays:

- The Sin of Height: The first essay explores Anglo-French ballooning in the 19th century, concentrating on photographer and inventor Gaspard-Félix Tournachon, later known simply as Nadar, who combined photography and aeronautics as the first aerial photographer. Also appearing are English colonel and pioneer balloonist Fred Burnaby and Sarah Bernhardt, who was photographed several times by Nadar.
- On the Level: Here Barnes fictionalizes the relationship between Burnaby and Bernhardt.
- The Loss of Depth: Barnes contemplates his wife's no longer being there: "the fact that someone is dead may mean that they are not alive, but doesn't mean that they do not exist."

== Reception ==
- Leyla Sanai said in The Independent "Anyone who has loved and lost can't fail to be moved by this devastating book."
- Blake Morrison said in The Guardian "Its resonance comes from all it doesn't say, as well as what it does; from the depth of love we infer from the desert of grief."
- Sarah Manguso said in the New York Times "the dialogue between Burnaby and Bernhardt can blush somewhat purple. In the third essay, Barnes refers to the dangerous lure of grief's 'self-pity, isolationism, world-scorn, an egotistical exceptionalism: all aspects of vanity'... the book's last section is one of the least indulgent accounts of mourning I have ever read. I almost wish Levels of Life consisted only of its 56 shattering pages.'
- On National Public Radio, Heller McAlpin stated "Among the many trenchant questions Barnes poses in Levels of Life is what constitutes success in mourning: 'Does it lie in remembering or in forgetting?'
- Sam Leith in The Spectator said "You learn almost nothing from it about Pat (she's not even named in the text), or about their relationship. The book is not an attempt to bring her to life. It describes and enacts her absence. It is the more piercing for Barnes's refusal to sentimentalise... For all Barnes's tools of detachment and self-analysis, this is a force-ten account of the ongoing pain of having loved entirely and lost entirely. It reads like what it is: a book with its heart missing.'

In 2019, The Guardian ranked it 45 on their list of the 100 best books of the 21st century.
