= In the Land of Pain =

Book by Alphonse Daudet

- 2002 English translation
- Author: Alphonse Daudet
- Translator: Julian Barnes
- Genre: Autobiography
- Published: 1930

In the Land of Pain is a collection of notes by Alphonse Daudet chronicling the pain and suffering he experienced from tabes dorsalis, its effects on his relationships with friends, family, and other people, and the various drugs he took and physical treatments he underwent in his fight against the disease. Daudet originally began making these notes for a projected book, but none of the material was published in his lifetime. He planned to use the title La Doulou, a Provençal word for pain. The collection was published in French in 1930 in a volume titled La Doulou (La Douleur): 1887–1895 et Le Trésor d'Arlatan: 1897, and translated into English in 2002 by Julian Barnes.

== Synopsis ==
Daudet records observations, experiences, and aphorisms related to his intense suffering over the course of many years. He describes his symptoms in graphic detail and charts their progression. This begins with isolated attacks of agonising nerve pain, and eventually becomes a daily litany of pain and use of drugs like opium and chloral hydrate to fight it. He comments on the effect of his illness on family and friends, and on his outlook on life.

He describes the different physical treatments he underwent, including being suspended in the air, diets, and a variety of injections. He also details his observations of fellow sufferers of the disease and his interactions with them. In his later years, he frequently spent time at sanitariums, becoming a celebrity among the other patients. He describes his time at these sanitariums in detail. Daudet stopped making these notes a few years before his death.

== Critical response ==
Daudet originally planned to use his notes on his sufferings to make either a novel or an autobiography. After discussing the projected work with fellow writer Edmond de Goncourt, Goncourt predicted the work would be superb because Daudet would be writing from intense personal experience. Although the book was never realized, translator Julian Barnes agrees with Goncourt's prediction in relation to the collection in its current form. He believes the notes format is appropriate and fitting for the subject because of its implication of passing time and its absence of disguise.

According to critic Richard Eder, this work is worthy of lasting recognition. Daudet uses wit to probe a dark and distressing subject, providing the reader with powerful images. Daudet surprisingly responds to his pain often with humor and spirit, and even comments mockingly on his disease and its symptoms at times. Some of the most poignant moments in the book are Daudet's expressions of sympathy for his fellow sufferers.
