= Staring at the Sun (novel) =

1986 novel by Julian Barnes

- First edition cover
- Author: Julian Barnes
- Genre: Literary fiction
- Publisher: Jonathan Cape
- Publication date: 1986
- ISBN: 978-0-224-02414-3

Staring at The Sun is a 1986 novel by English writer Julian Barnes.

In the novel, Barnes examines the ordinary life of Jean Serjeant from her childhood in the 1920s through her adulthood to the year 2020. Throughout her life, Jean learns to question the world's idea of truth while she explores the beauty and miracles of everyday life.
