= Cross Channel (short story collection) =

- First edition (UK)
- Author: Julian Barnes
- Language: English
- Publisher: Jonathan Cape (UK); Knopf (US)
- Publication date: 1996
- Publication place: England
- Media type: Print
- Pages: 211
- ISBN: 0-224-04301-3

Cross Channel is a collection of short stories by Julian Barnes, first published in 1996 by Jonathan Cape. As the title suggests, all stories focus on the connection between England and France.

== Stories ==
- "Interference" (The New Yorker, 19 Sep 1994) - 69-year-old English composer Leonard Verity lives near Coulommiers in Northern France with his long term partner Adeline. His most recent composition 'English Four Seasons' was planning to be broadcast on the radio by the BBC, but they have difficulties receiving it from England, as their neighbour's electrical appliances interfere...
- "Junction" - Set in the 1840s, a French group from Rouen were fascinated by the English navvies who were building the Paris–Le Havre railway. Meanwhile the church authorities were concerned about the arrival of the railway and the navvies. The tale also includes the collapse of the Barentin Viaduct and concludes with the award of the Légion d'honneur by Thomas Brassey who oversaw the line.
- "Experiment" (The New Yorker, 17 July 1995) - The narrator's Uncle Freddy was in Paris in 1928 where he attended a surrealist group including André Breton, Benjamin Péret, Raymond Queneau and Jacques Prévert. The narrator has read the transcription about sex. The group then arranges for Freddy to have blindfolded sex with a Frenchwoman and Englishwoman...
- "Melon" - The story is split into three parts:
  - Firstly a letter is written from Montpellier by Sir Hamilton Lindsay to his cousin Evelina in Surrey as he describes his experiences as he and Mr. Hawkins travel through France.
  - 15 years later in 1789 Hamilton Lindsay travels to France to via Chertsey and Dover to accompany the Dorset's XI cricket team (organised by the Duke of Dorset, the Ambassador to France) to play 'The Gentlemen of France' in the Champs-Elysees in Paris, but due the worsening situation in France Dorset returns to England and match was instead played in Sevenoaks.
  - A dozen or so year later, Hamilton Lindsay is now a general and is living in France where he is joined by Evelina.
- "Evermore" (The New Yorker, 13 November 1995)- Every year an elderly sister visits the Thiepval Memorial in France as her brother Samuel died at Battle of the Somme where he served with the East Lancashire Regiment. At first she travelled by train, but now she drives, sleeping in her Morris. After visiting the monument she travels to his grave at Cabaret Rouge, the Star of David on his white headstone. This story was also published in mini-book format, by Penguin (1996) with artwork by Howard Hodgkin.
- "Gnossienne" (Granta 50, 29 June 1995) - An author who normally turns down literary conferences, piqued by a curiously amateur invitation decides to attend a conference in Marrant, a village in Cantal in France. The invitation only required that 'attendance is performance'. When he arrives the mayor and a brass band meets him. That evening he meets other invitees, eats well, and tells them of his experiences of France, finding the experience spontaneously enjoyable. He leaves early the next morning. Then he discovers later that his host was a writer invented by the Oulipo group, realising that Marrant is a translation of funny and that he had experienced the pataphysical...
- "Dragons" (Granta 32, 28 June 1990) - The dragons étrangers du Roi arrive from the north, The King's Edict made them tear down the village temple as the regiment tries to destroy the villagers religion. Three of them were now stationed in carpenter Pierre Chaigne's house to collect tallage, they then burn all of his wood and sleep with his daughter, as his children abjured.
- "Brambilla" - the story shows the rigours and complexities of competitive cycling, with downhill speeds, doping, Sean Kelly and concluding with Pierre Brambilla.
- "Hermitage" Florence and Emily, Englishwomen in their thirties move from Essex (citing their neighbours as being Turnip-farmers) to Pauillac in France to take buy a run-down vineyard in the 1880's. By the end of the century their efforts have rewarded them with moderate success.
- "Tunnel" - An elderly man travels on the Eurostar to Paris. He imagines the lives of those in his carriage, and he thinks back to his previous travels. The story then concludes with 'the elderly Englishman, when he returned home, began to write the stories you have just read.'
