= Elizabeth Finch (novel) =

Novel by Julian Barnes

- Author: Julian Barnes
- Cover artist: Suzanne Dean
- Language: English
- Genre: Fiction
- Publisher: Jonathan Cape
- Publication date: 2022
- Publication place: United Kingdom
- Media type: Print
- Pages: 192
- ISBN: 978-1-78733-393-2

Elizabeth Finch is a novel by Julian Barnes, published in 2022. It is the 14th novel published under his own name, and was released in the United Kingdom on 14 April 2022.

The title character is based on Barnes's friend Anita Brookner.

In the novel's central event, Finch is pursued by the newspapers after an LRB lecture. The set-up of British tabloid interest in academia was thought implausible by some reviewers; Barnes, however, noted what he described as the "disgusting" treatment of historical novelist Hilary Mantel when she spoke about the state of the British royal family at the British Museum in 2013 and then wrote about it for the London Review of Books. Barnes said the outline of Finch's experience had come "virtually word for word, picture for picture" from the Daily Mail's coverage. Mantel died later that year.

== See also ==
- Roman à clef
