= Flaubert's Parrot =

1984 novel by Julian Barnes

- First edition cover
- Author: Julian Barnes
- Language: English
- Publisher: Jonathan Cape
- Publication date: 1984
- Publication place: England
- Media type: Print (Hardcover)
- Pages: 190 pp
- ISBN: 0-7475-1347-3
- OCLC: 27415629

Flaubert's Parrot is a novel by Julian Barnes that was shortlisted for the Booker Prize in 1984, and won the Geoffrey Faber Memorial Prize and the Prix Médicis Essai in 1985 and 1986 respectively. The novel recites amateur Gustave Flaubert expert Geoffrey Braithwaite's musings on his subject's life, and his own, as he looks for a stuffed parrot that inspired the great author.

== Plot summary ==
The novel follows Geoffrey Braithwaite, a widowed, retired English doctor, visiting France. While visiting sites related to Flaubert, Geoffrey discovers two museums claiming to display the stuffed parrot which sat atop Flaubert's writing desk for a brief period while he wrote "Un Cœur Simple". While trying to identify which is authentic, Braithwaite learns that Flaubert's parrot could be any one of fifty ("Une cinquantaine de perroquets!", p. 187) that had been held in the collection of the municipal museum.

== Themes ==
One of the central themes of the novel is subjectivism. The novel provides three sequential chronologies of Flaubert's life: the first is optimistic (citing his successes, etc.), the second is negative (citing the deaths of his friends/lovers, his failures, illnesses etc.) and the third compiles quotations written by Flaubert in his journal at various points in his life.

== Style ==
Barnes's book is considered an exemplar of the postmodern novel. It does not follow a traditional fictional narrative but rather appears to be a non-fictional biographical exploration of Gustave Flaubert's life and his thoughts on various topics, written by a fictional character, Geoffrey Braithwaite.

Rather than providing a traditional chapter-by-chapter plot and narrative, each chapter in the book approaches some aspect of Flaubert's life or Braithwaite's life, most in a style of writing not typical of a novel.

The first chapter, "Flaubert's Parrot", introduces the theme of the two stuffed parrots, either one of which might have been the parrot Flaubert used as inspiration for his story "Un Cœur Simple", and describes Braithwaite's journey to Rouen to see the parrots and determine which of them was 'Flaubert's parrot'.

The second chapter, "Chronology", provides a timeline of Flaubert's life from birth, first loves, friendships, publications, and death. A second timeline lists important setbacks in Flaubert's life from the deaths of family members and friends, his expulsion from school, and the onset of his epilepsy. A third timeline is constructed of quotations from Flaubert's letters and diaries, many of which are metaphors describing Flaubert's own conception of himself (as a cigar, as a literary lizard, as a coconut, as a mass of dead seaweed).

The third chapter, "Finders Keepers", details a series of interactions between Braithwaite and Ed Winterton, a scholar who claims to have discovered a cache of previously unknown letters between Flaubert and Juliet Herbert, an English governess with whom the writer was thought to be in love.

The fourth chapter, "The Flaubert Bestiary", further explores the metaphorical conception Flaubert had of himself as a bear, and also explores the appearance and importance of other animals in Flaubert's writings, including parrots, as well as all the pets Flaubert was known to have had.

The fifth chapter, "Snap!" is a meditation on the idea of coincidences, on what Flaubert thought of them, and on a series of coincidences in Flaubert's life and fiction.

The sixth chapter, "Emma Bovary's Eyes", takes literary critics, particularly the noted Flaubert critic Enid Starkie, to task for dwelling on minutiae and deliberately seeking out mistakes in an author's work, and continues on this theme to determine what sorts of errors in fiction are forgivable and which are not.

The seventh chapter, "Cross Channel", the longest chapter in the book, describes a trip back and forth across the English Channel by boat and is notable for directly addressing the reader as if they were a fellow passenger. It continues the polemic against critics (now including Edmund Gosse and Jean-Paul Sartre), explores many important themes in Flaubert's work, evokes some specificities of the region in which Flaubert lived and set many of his novels, and lays out a systematic series of Braithwaite's opinions on which types of novels should no longer be written.

The eighth chapter, "The Train-spotter's Guide to Flaubert", written as a numbered list of annotations, explores Flaubert's use of and generally negative opinions on railway trains, which were a new technological development in Flaubert's lifetime. Flaubert's long relationship with Louise Colet, which necessitated train travel between Rouen and Paris, is a main theme of this chapter.

Chapter nine, "The Flaubert Apocrypha", which includes another numbered series of annotations, examines books Flaubert planned to write but never completed, ideas which he discussed but did not include in his published books, and a series of moments in Flaubert's life when he considered a drastically different life or career path than he eventually chose.

The tenth chapter, "The Case Against", begins to address the story of Braithwaite's late wife, of whom the reader still knows little, but quickly turns instead to a numbered list of general complaints critics and readers have against Flaubert, and Braithwaite's often exasperated rebuttals to these complaints. Many of these rebuttals include statements about the purpose of art and the necessary differences between art and life.

Chapter eleven, "Louise Colet's Version", as its title suggests, provides an imagined first-person account of Louise Colet's long romantic and professional association with Flaubert. This is the only chapter in the novel that is not presented either from Braithwaite's point of view or as an ostensibly neutral or academic presentation of facts or quotations.

Chapter twelve, "Braithwaite's Dictionary of Accepted Ideas", is a mimicry of Flaubert's own Dictionary of Received Ideas that reiterates the important people and themes of Flaubert's life as discussed in the novel so far. Each one-word entry or name (one for each letter A through Z) is followed by a brief, witty, yet opinionated definition.

The thirteenth chapter, "Pure Story", provides the full story of the life and death of Braithwaite's wife, laced with parallels and references to Flaubert's fiction.

Chapter fourteen, "Examination Paper", is presented as a timed written essay exam on Flaubert's life and work as presented in the previous chapters of the novel. Questions are posed under various topics (such as economics, geography, psychology, phonetics, and theatrical history).

The fifteenth and final chapter, "And the Parrot..." returns to the more traditional novelistic narrative of the first chapter in which Braithwaite attempts to determine which of two parrots was the one that Flaubert kept briefly in his house as inspiration for his story.
