= Metroland (novel) =

1980 novel by Julian Barnes

- First edition
- Author: Julian Barnes
- Language: English
- Genre: Bildungsroman
- Publisher: Jonathan Cape
- Publication date: 1980
- Publication place: United Kingdom
- Media type: Print (Hardback & Paperback)
- Pages: 176 pp
- ISBN: 0-224-01762-4
- OCLC: 27013621
- Dewey Decimal: 823/.914 20
- LC Class: PR6052.A6657 M47 1980

Metroland is an English novel written by Julian Barnes and published in 1980, the author's first book.

== Overview ==
Metroland is a first person account of Christopher Lloyd and his experiences growing up in the so-called Metro-land (a name given to the suburbs to the north-west of London that were served by the Metropolitan Railway), his brief life in Paris as a graduate student and the early years of his subsequent marriage. It is divided into three sections: I Metroland (1963); II Paris (1968); and III Metroland (1977). As adolescents Christopher and his childhood friend Toni had shown contempt for the bourgeois establishment but this lifestyle is one that Christopher ultimately chooses, much to Toni's disappointment, obtaining a secure job in publishing, marrying, buying a house and having a child. Christopher realises that his normal life and somewhat mundane marriage are not perfect, nor are they necessarily more exciting than his time in Paris with his bold French girlfriend Annick, but he does love his wife and is content.

== Reception ==
Philip Larkin wrote a letter to Barnes. Barnes later recounted that Larkin had written "that he had much enjoyed it, despite his prejudice against novels with people under the age of 21 in them. He added, gloomily, something like, 'but is that what life's like nowadays?' This unexpected praise was the most gratifying moment of the strange passage of first publication." Barnes' mother complained about the book's "bombardment" of filth.

== Film adaptation ==
In 1997 Metroland was made into a film starring Christian Bale and Emily Watson, with a score by Mark Knopfler. The executive producer was Andrew Bandall and the director was Philip Saville.
