= Julian Barnes =

English writer (born 1946)

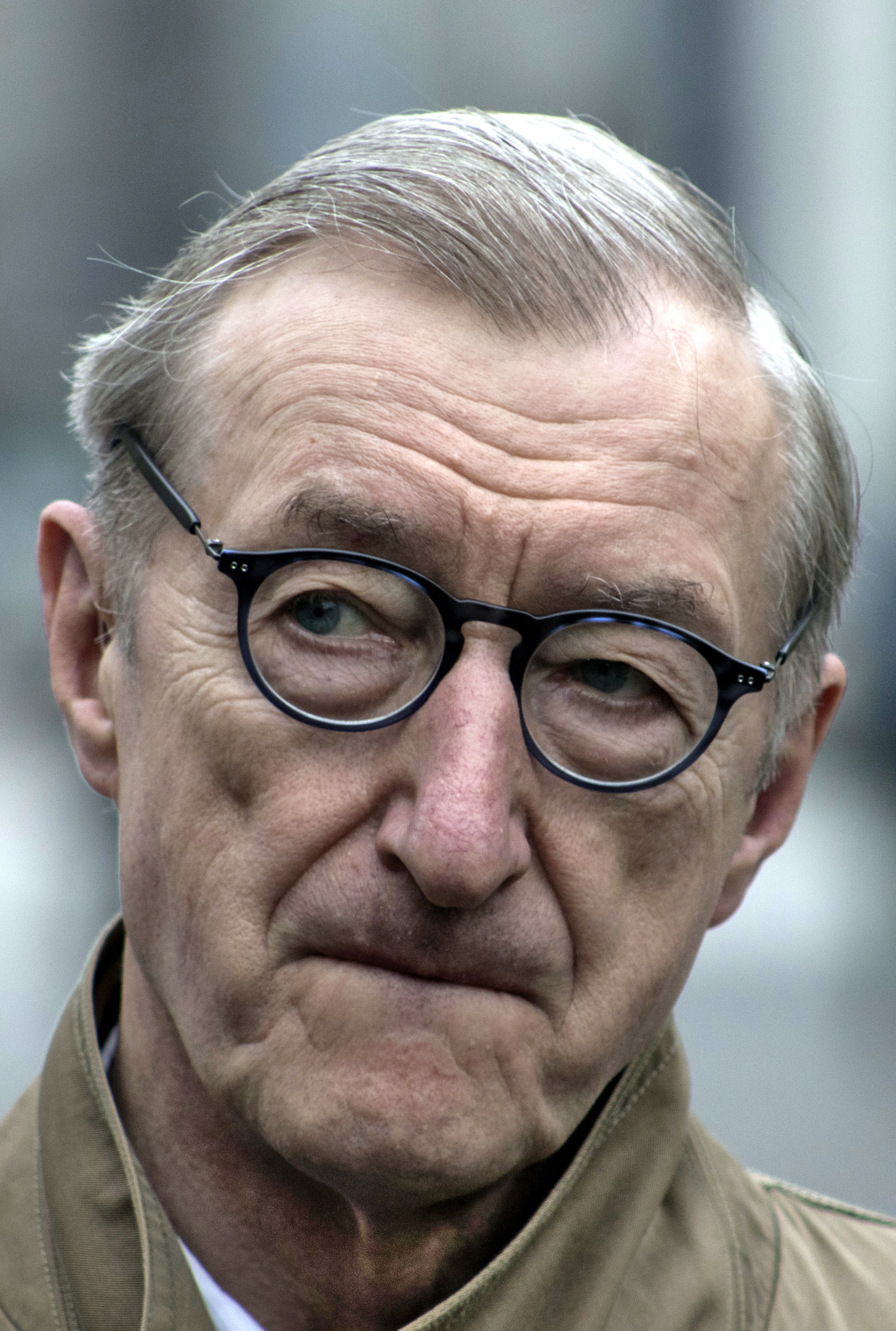
- Barnes in 2019
- Born: 19 January 1946 (age 80); Leicester, England
- Education: Magdalen College, Oxford
- Occupations: Writer, lexicographer
- Spouses: Pat Kavanagh (m. 1979; died 2008) Rachel Cugnoni (m. 2025)
- Children: 0
- Relatives: Jonathan Barnes (brother)
- Writing career
- Pen name: PC49, Dan Kavanagh, Fat Jeff, Edward Pygge, Basil Seal
- Years active: 1980—present
- Genres: Essay, Memoir, Novel, Short story
- Subjects: Memory, grief, death, France
- Notable works: Flaubert's Parrot
- Notable awards: See § Awards and honours
- Movement: Postmodernism
- Website: julianbarnes.com

Julian Patrick Barnes (born 19 January 1946) is an English essayist, novelist and short story writer.

After completing his education, Barnes spent three years as a lexicographer for the Oxford English Dictionary supplement. His first work of fiction – Metroland – was published in 1980, with his second – Before She Met Me – following two years later. Flaubert's Parrot was shortlisted for the 1984 Booker Prize, was a finalist for the 1988 Grinzane Cavour Prize, and won both the 1985 Geoffrey Faber Memorial Prize and the 1986 Prix Médicis Essai. Barnes published Staring at the Sun and A History of the World in 10½ Chapters later the same decade.

Talking It Over – published in 1991 – won the 1992 Prix Femina étranger, and was followed nine years later by a sequel titled Love, etc, in between which the short story collection Cross Channel and two longer works – The Porcupine and England, England – appeared. Arthur & George was shortlisted for both the 2005 Booker Prize and 2007 Dublin Literary Award, while The Sense of an Ending won the former prize in 2011. Two further short story collections – The Lemon Table and Pulse – were published in 2004 and 2011 respectively.

Among Barnes's later works of fiction were The Noise of Time, The Only Story and Elizabeth Finch. To coincide with his 80th birthday in January 2026 he published Departure(s), saying it would be his last book. Alongside his fictional work – he wrote four works of crime fiction under the pseudonym Dan Kavanagh – he has published several essay collections, as well as two memoirs and the nonfiction book, The Man in the Red Coat – about people of Belle Époque Paris in the arts. He also translated In the Land of Pain from French into English.

Appointed Chevalier de l'Ordre des Arts et des Lettres in 1988, Officier de l'Ordre des Arts et des Lettres in 1995 and Commandeur de l'Ordre des Arts et des Lettres in 2004, his other honours include the 1986 E. M. Forster Award, the 1993 Shakespeare Prize, the 2004 Austrian State Prize for European Literature, the 2016 Siegfried Lenz Prize, the 2021 Jerusalem Prize, and the 2026 Princess of Asturias Award for Literature. He has been mentioned as a candidate for the Nobel Prize in Literature.

== Early life ==
Barnes was born in Leicester, in the East Midlands of England, on 19 January 1946, although his family moved to the outer suburbs of London six weeks afterwards. The younger brother of philosopher Jonathan Barnes, both of their parents were French teachers. Barnes said his support for Leicester City Football Club was – aged four or five – "a sentimental way of hanging on" to his home city. At the age of 10, Barnes's mother told her son he had "too much imagination".

In 1956, the family moved to Northwood, Middlesex, the 'Metro-land' of his first novel. He went to the City of London School from 1957 until 1964, then to Magdalen College, Oxford, where he studied modern languages. After graduating, he spent three years as a lexicographer for the Oxford English Dictionary supplement, specialising in "sports and dirty words". He then worked as a reviewer and literary editor for the New Statesman and the New Review. During his time at the New Statesman, Barnes suffered from debilitating shyness, about which he said: "When there were weekly meetings I would be paralysed into silence, and was thought of as the mute member of staff." He was a television critic between 1979 and 1986, beginning with the New Statesman and continuing with The Observer.

== Writing ==
Barnes works – among his books and papers – on an IBM 196C electric typewriter in a study containing a large desk with three sides. He had to replace his original typewriter in 2023 when no one in Britain could repair it. A Hungarian wrote him a letter with news of an unused and working replacement IBM 196C for him.

=== Beginnings: 1980–1989 ===
Barnes's first novel – Metroland – was published in 1980. It is the story of Christopher, a young man from the London suburbs who – as a student – travels to Paris, France, finally returning to London. The novel deals with themes of idealism and sexual fidelity, and has the three-part structure that is a common recurrence in Barnes's work. After reading the novel, Barnes's mother complained about the book's "bombardment" of filth.

His second novel, Before She Met Me (1982), features a darker narrative, a story of revenge by a jealous historian who becomes obsessed with the past of his second wife. Barnes's breakthrough novel, Flaubert's Parrot (1984), departed from the traditional linear structure of his previous novels and featured a fragmentary biographical-style story of an elderly doctor, Geoffrey Braithwaite, who focuses obsessively on the life of Gustave Flaubert. About Flaubert, Barnes has said, "he's the writer whose words I most carefully tend to weigh, who I think has spoken the most truth about writing." Flaubert's Parrot was published to great acclaim, especially in France, and helped to establish Barnes as a serious literary figure; the novel was shortlisted for the Booker Prize, was a finalist for the 1988 Grinzane Cavour Prize, and won both the 1985 Geoffrey Faber Memorial Prize and the 1986 Prix Médicis Essai. His publisher would later gift him one of Gustave Flaubert's original letters when Barnes surpassed paperback sales of one million of all his works. When researching Flaubert's Parrot, Barnes found a notebook by Alphonse Daudet in Oxford's Taylorian library; he later spent a great deal of time translating and editing it, and it was published in 2002 as In the Land of Pain.

In 1986, Barnes published Staring at the Sun, a novel about a woman growing to maturity in postwar England and dealing with issues of love, truth, and mortality. In 1989, he published A History of the World in 10½ Chapters, a nonlinear novel using a variety of writing styles to call into question perceived notions of human history and knowledge itself.

=== Middle years: 1990s–2000s ===
In 1991, Barnes published Talking It Over, a novel about a contemporary love triangle, in which the three characters take turns to talk to the reader, reflecting on common events. A sequel – Love, etc – revisited the characters ten years on; this was published in 2000. Between the two there was The Porcupine – a novel published in 1992 – which again deals with a historical theme, this time depicting the trial of Stoyo Petkanov – the former leader of a collapsed Communist country in Eastern Europe – as he stands trial for crimes against his country. The 1998 humorous novel England, England explores the idea of national identity through the entrepreneur Sir Jack Pitman's decision to create a theme park on the Isle of Wight that resembles some of England's tourist spots. It contained a reference to the UK leaving the European Union, which Barnes was asked about after Brexit. Barnes – a keen Francophile – also published Cross Channel, a collection of 10 stories charting Britain's relationship with France. He would return to the topic of France in Something to Declare, a collection of essays on French subjects published in 2002.

In 2003, Barnes undertook a rare acting role as the voice of Georges Simenon in a BBC Radio 4 series of adaptations of Inspector Maigret stories. Arthur & George (2005) – a fictional account of a true crime that was investigated by Sir Arthur Conan Doyle – made the 2007 Dublin Literary Award shortlist.

=== Later years: 2011–present ===
Barnes's 11th novel, The Sense of an Ending, was published by Jonathan Cape on 4 August 2011. In October of that year, it was awarded the Booker Prize. The judges took 31 minutes to come to their decision, with head judge Stella Rimington saying it was a "beautifully written book" and that the panel thought it "spoke to humankind in the 21st Century." Though Barnes was present at the ceremony, he had stayed away from publicity surrounding the prize, which The Daily Telegraph attributed to his previous comment that "The only sensible attitude to the Booker is to treat it as posh bingo. It drives publishers mad with hope, booksellers mad with greed, judges mad with power, winners mad with pride, and losers (the unsuccessful short-listees plus every other novelist in the country) mad with envy and disappointment". Barnes's "posh bingo" remark dates from 1987, but was still remembered decades afterwards. The Sense of an Ending also won the 2012 Europese Literatuurprijs and was on the 2011 Costa Book Awards shortlist.

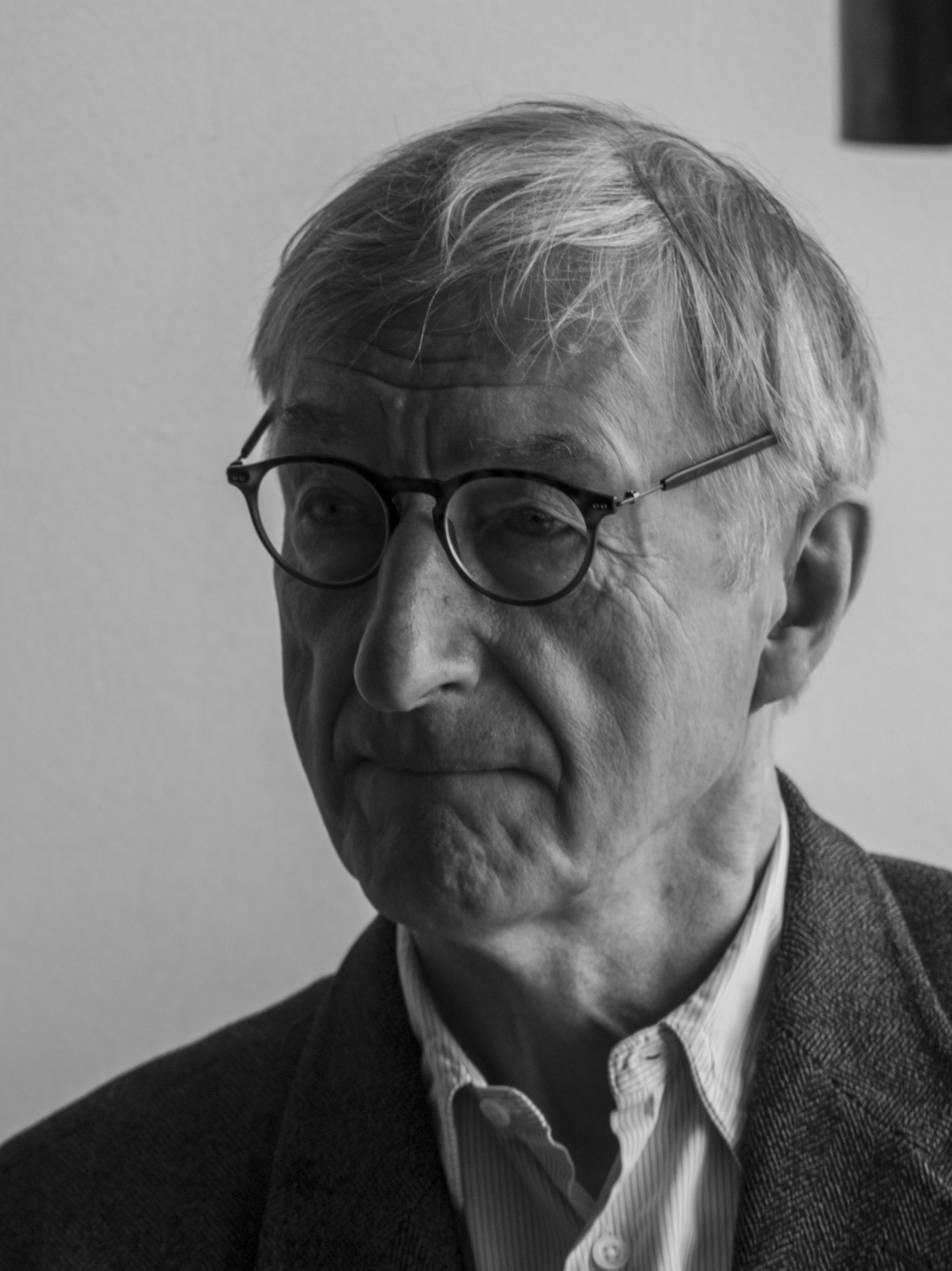
Barnes in 2019

In 2013, Barnes published Levels of Life. The first of three sections gives a history of early ballooning and aerial photography, describing the work of Gaspard-Félix Tournachon. The second part is a short story about Fred Burnaby and the French actor Sarah Bernhardt, both also balloonists. The third part is an essay discussing Barnes's grief over the death of his wife, Pat Kavanagh (although she is not named): "You put together two people who have not been put together before . . . Sometimes it works, and something new is made, and the world is changed . . . I was thirty-two when we met, sixty-two when she died. The heart of my life; the life of my heart." Blake Morrison, writing in The Guardian, said of the third section: "Its resonance comes from all it doesn't say, as well as what it does; from the depth of love we infer from the desert of grief."

The Noise of Time, a historical novel published in 2016, features a fictionalised version of composer Dmitry Shostakovich. This was followed by The Only Story, published in 2018, which features the reflections of a man upon a relationship with an older woman. Elizabeth Finch, published in 2022, has as its title character a woman who is pursued by the newspapers after an LRB lecture. The set-up of British tabloid interest in academia was thought implausible by some reviewers; Barnes, however, noted what he described as the "disgusting" treatment of historical novelist Hilary Mantel when she spoke about the state of the British royal family at the British Museum in 2013 and then wrote about it for the London Review of Books. Barnes said the outline of Finch's experience had come "virtually word for word, picture for picture" from the Daily Mail's coverage. Mantel died later that year.

In 2025, Barnes published the essays entitled Changing My Mind, in which he questions whether it is possible for the Self to change the mind, stating instead that it is the mind that changes our identity, the Self being inside the mind and not something separate from it. Furthermore, these essays contain reflections on memory, in which, developing what his brother had suggested to him – namely that memory is "an act of the imagination" – Barnes argues that "sometimes we remember as true things that never even happened in the first place; that we may grossly embellish an original incident out of all recognition; that we may cannibalise someone else's memory, and change not just the endings of the stories of our lives, but also their middles and beginnings. I think that memory, over time, changes, and, indeed, changes our mind".

On 20 January 2026 – the day after Barnes's 80th birthday – Departure(s) went on sale in the UK, with Barnes declaring it as his final book to be published.

== Awards and honours ==
- 1981: Somerset Maugham Award, winner, Metroland (jointly with Clive Sinclair's Hearts of Gold and A. N. Wilson's The Healing Art)
- 1985: Geoffrey Faber Memorial Prize winner, Flaubert's Parrot
- 1986: E. M. Forster Award from the American Academy and Institute of Arts and Letters
- 1986: Prix Médicis Essai, winner, Flaubert's Parrot
- 1988: Gutenberg Prize
- 1988: Grinzane Cavour Prize finalist, Flaubert's Parrot
- 1988: Chevalier de l'Ordre des Arts et des Lettres
- 1992: Prix Femina étranger, winner, Talking It Over
- 1993: Shakespeare Prize, Alfred Toepfer Foundation
- 1995: Officier de l'Ordre des Arts et des Lettres
- 2004: Austrian State Prize for European Literature
- 2004: Commandeur de l'Ordre des Arts et des Lettres
- 2011: David Cohen Prize for Literature
- 2011: Booker Prize, winner, The Sense of an Ending
- 2012: Europese Literatuurprijs winner, The Sense of an Ending
- 2015: Zinklar Award at the first annual Blixen Ceremony in Copenhagen
- 2016: Siegfried Lenz Prize
- 2017: Officier in the Ordre National de la Légion d'Honneur
- 2021: Jerusalem Prize
- 2021: Yasnaya Polyana Prize winner, Nothing to Be Frightened Of
- 2021: Jean Bernard Prize
- 2026: Princess of Asturias Awards in the category of "Literature".

== Personal life ==
Barnes has lived in Tufnell Park, north London, since 1983. He has described himself as an agnostic, who is "probably an atheist".

Barnes married his first wife, Pat Kavanagh (a literary agent), in 1979. She had a brain tumor and died on 20 October 2008. Barnes wrote of his grief over his first wife's death in an essay that appears in his 2013 book, Levels of Life.

Also in 2013, he gave a rare interview to The New Statesman for its Centenary Issue, during which he spoke against the British government's "mass closure of public libraries", as well as the UK's "slip down the world league table for literacy... [its] ideological worship of the market – as quasi-religious as nature-worship – and an ever-widening gap between rich and poor". He opined on several British prime ministers: Gordon Brown, "such a relief after the previous occupant"; James Callaghan, "fondness (again, it was such a change after the weaselly Wilson)"; John Major, approval "until he sold off the railways, for which may he be boiled in oil throughout eternity".

Barnes had a "health scare" in 2020, which he was initially reticent about in public. He later revealed he was undergoing treatment for a rare form of blood cancer, diagnosed in 2020 and requiring chemotherapy drugs to keep its effects at bay for the remainder of his life. He is a patron of the human rights organisation Freedom from Torture, for which he has sponsored several fundraising events, and Dignity in Dying, a campaign group for assisted dying.

After 8 years of romance, Barnes secretly married Rachel Cugnoni in August 2025, but did not make it public until just before he turned 80 the following year.

== Works ==
=== Novels ===
- Metroland (1980) ISBN 0-224-01762-4
- Before She Met Me (1982) ISBN 978-0-224-01985-9
- Flaubert's Parrot (1984) – shortlisted for the 1984 Booker Prize; winner of both the 1985 Geoffrey Faber Memorial Prize and 1986 Prix Médicis Essai ISBN 978-0-394-54272-0
- Staring at the Sun (1986) ISBN 978-0-224-02414-3
- A History of the World in 10½ Chapters (1989) ISBN 0-224-03190-2
- Talking It Over (1991) ISBN 0-224-03157-0
- The Porcupine (1992) ISBN 0-224-03618-1
- England, England (1998) – shortlisted for the 1998 Booker Prize ISBN 0-224-05275-6
- Love, etc (2000) – sequel to Talking It Over ISBN 0-224-03101-5
- Arthur & George (2005) – shortlisted for the 2005 Booker Prize and the 2007 Dublin Literary Award;, was on The New York Times bestsellers list for Hardback Fiction, a first for Barnes. ISBN 0-224-07703-1
- The Sense of an Ending (2011) – several weeks on the New York Times Bestseller list; winner of the 2011 Booker Prize. ISBN 978-0-224-09415-3
- The Noise of Time (2016) ISBN 978-1-910702-60-4
- The Only Story (2018) ISBN 978-1-78733-069-6
- Elizabeth Finch (2022) ISBN 978-1-78733-393-2
- Departure(s) (2026) ISBN 978-1-78733-572-1

=== Collections ===
- Cross Channel (1996) ISBN 0-224-04301-3
- The Lemon Table (2004) ISBN 0-224-07198-X
- Pulse (2011) ISBN 0-224-09108-5

=== Translations ===
- Alphonse Daudet: In the Land of Pain (2002), translation of Daudet's La Doulou
- Volker Kriegel: The Truth About Dogs (1988), translation of Kriegel's Kleine Hunde-Kunde

=== Non-fiction ===
- Letters from London (Picador, London, 1995) – journalism from The New Yorker, ISBN 0-330-34116-2
- Something to Declare (2002) – essays ISBN 0-330-48916-X
- The Pedant in the Kitchen (2003) – journalism on cooking ISBN 1-843-54240-4
- Nothing to Be Frightened Of (2008) – memoir ISBN 0-099-52374-4
- Through the Window (2012) – 17 essays and a short story ISBN 0-099-57858-1
- A Life with Books (2012) – booklet ISBN 0-224-09726-1
- Levels of Life (2013) – memoir ISBN 0-22-409815-2
- Keeping an Eye Open: Essays on Art (October, 2015) – essays ISBN 978-0-22410-201-8 updated edition, with seven new essays (2020) ISBN 978-1-78733-289-8
- The Man in the Red Coat (2019) ISBN 978-1-78733-216-4
- Changing My Mind (March, 2025) – essay ISBN 978-1-91255-969-5

=== Pseudonymous works ===
During the 1980s – having recently married his first wife Pat Kavanagh, a literary agent – Barnes wrote four works of crime fiction using the pseudonym "Dan Kavanagh". The novels centred around the main character Duffy, a former police detective turned security advisor. The character of Duffy represents one of Britain's first bisexual male detectives. Barnes said the use of a pseudonym is "liberating in that you could indulge any fantasies of violence you might have". While Metroland – his first novel, published in 1980 – took Barnes eight years to write, Duffy and the rest of the Kavanagh books typically took fewer than two weeks each to put to paper—an experiment to test "what it would be like writing as fast as I possibly could in a concentrated way".

"Duffy the private detective" books

- Duffy (1980) ISBN 0-224-01822-1
- Fiddle City (1981) ISBN 0-224-01977-5
- Putting the Boot In (1985) ISBN 0-224-02332-2
- Going to the Dogs (1987) ISBN 0-394-56322-0

Short story

- "The 50p Santa. A Duffy Detective Story" (1985)
