= Regent (disambiguation) =

A regent is someone appointed to administer a state in the absence, incapacity, or minority of the monarch.

Regent or The Regent may also refer to:

== Arts, entertainment, and media ==
- The Regent (play), a 1788 tragedy by Bertie Greatheed
- The Regent, a novel by Arnold Bennett
- "Regent" (House of the Dragon), a 2024 episode of the television series House of the Dragon
- Regent Records (UK)
- Regent Records (US)
- Regent Releasing, a theatrical film distribution company
- Regent Theatre (disambiguation), several theatres and cinemas
- Townsquare Media, a radio broadcaster based in Cincinnati, Ohio, US formerly known as Regent Communication.

== Brands and enterprises ==
- Regent (German brand), German handmade suits manufacturer
- Regent, a chain of filling stations in Britain that was purchased by Texaco
- Regent LP, an American private equity firm
- Regent Seven Seas Cruises, a cruise line based in Fort Lauderdale, Florida, US
- Sands Regent, a casino holding company based in Reno, Nevada, US

== Education ==
- Regent, a member of a Board of Regents
- Regent College, a Christian graduate school in Vancouver, British Columbia, Canada
- Regent College, Leicester, a former college in Leicester, England
- Regent House, the official governing body of the University of Cambridge, England
- Regent House Grammar School, a coeducational grammar school in Newtownards, County Down, Northern Ireland
- Regent master (Magister regens), in the medieval university
- Regent University, a Christian university in Virginia Beach, Virginia, US
- Regent Secondary School, a government secondary school in Choa Chu Kang, Singapore

== Hotels ==
- Regent Inns, the parent company of Walkabout and Jongleurs/Bar Risa chains
- Regent International Hotels, a luxury hotel chain
- Regent Palace Hotel, a hotel in Glasshouse Street, London, England

== Places ==
- Regent, North Dakota, city in Hettinger County, North Dakota, US
- Regent, Sierra Leone, town in the Western Area Rural District of Sierra Leone
- Regent Centre, business park in Gosforth, near Newcastle, England, UK
- Regent Square (Pittsburgh), neighborhood in the East End area of Pittsburgh, Pennsylvania, US

== Species ==
- Regent bowerbird, Sericulus chrysocephalus
- Regent honeyeater, Xanthomyza phrygia
- Regent parrot, Polytelis anthopeplus
- Regent whistler, Pachycephala schlegelii

== Transport ==
- Regent, a freighter from the Latvian fleet that fought for the Allies in World War II
- AEC Regent I, a double-decker bus produced by Associated Equipment Company between 1929 and 1942
- Dodge Regent, an automobile built by Chrysler Corporation of Canada
- HMS Regent, the name of three ships of the English navy or Royal Navy
- Regent Airways, a Bangladeshi airline owned by HG Aviation Ltd
- Regent railway station, a railway station in Melbourne, Victoria, Australia
- RFA Regent (A486), an ammunition, explosives, and food stores ship in the Royal Fleet Auxiliary, UK

== Other uses ==
- Philippe II, Duke of Orléans, also referred to as "the Regent"
- Regent (grape), a grape variety
- Regent (insecticide)
- Pompadour (hairstyle) or regent, a hairstyle
- Regent Diamond, a large diamond found in India in 1698, now in the Louvre Museum, France

== See also ==
- Beverly Wilshire Hotel, known as the Regent Beverly Wilshire in the 1990s
- Regency (disambiguation)
- Regente Feijó, a municipality in the state of São Paulo in Brazil
- Regenten, the oligarchy that ruled the Dutch Republic
- Regents (disambiguation) (includes "Regent's")
- Regent's Park (disambiguation)
