= Air Street =

Street in London, England

Coordinates: 51.509735°N 0.136080°W

Looking north down Air Street from Piccadilly

Air Street is a street in the City of Westminster. It intersects the Quadrant of Regent Street from north to south, running from Brewer Street to Piccadilly.

== History and description ==
The street was laid out in 1658 as the most westerly street in London at the time. It is named after Thomas Ayres, a local brewer and builder for whom Brewer Street is similarly named.

It is today characterised by the arches and screens at the points it meets Regent Street both from the north in the south, although the latter is more prominent as it provides a view to those on the better trodden Piccadilly. The arches form part of the rebuilding of Regent Street in a grand Edwardian style in the early 20th century, with the particular details of the arches agreed upon in 1916.

Notable buildings along the street include at the southern end the rear of the Swan and Edgar Building on the east, as well as the Piccadilly Hotel and Denman House on the west, the latter occupying a chunk of land which the former hoped to acquire but instead had to change its designs. On the north of Regent Street is the Hotel Cafe Royal abutting the streets east, and further on beyond Glasshouse Street the remains of the old Regent Palace Hotel.

== See also ==
- Vine Street
