= Hancocks & Co =

UK jewellery business

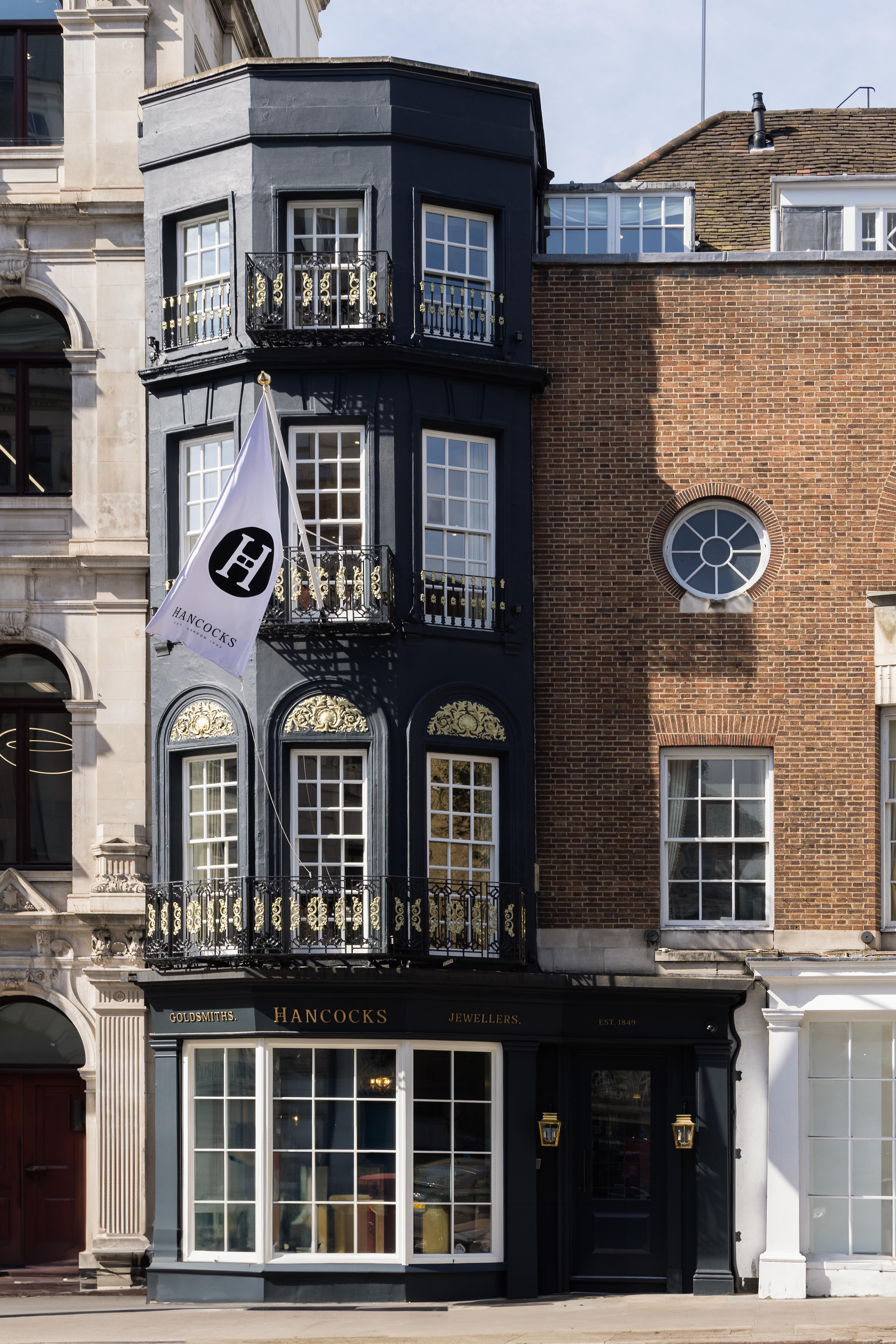
Hancocks London, 62 St James's Street, London, SW1A 1LY.

Hancocks & Co is a retail jeweller in London, founded on 1 January 1849 by Charles F. Hancock, a former partner of Storr and Mortimer. The first shop was opened at a corner of Bruton Street and New Bond Street, in London. It has moved several times since then and is now located on St James's Street. Hancocks has become notable for the manufacture of the Victoria Cross medals and also for the various Royal Warrants that it holds.

== History ==
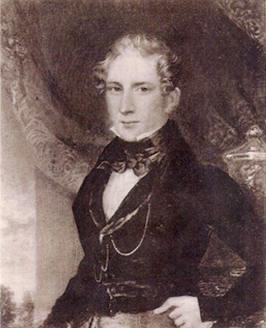
Charles Frederick Hancock

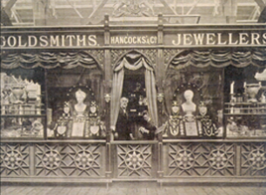
Hancock at the 1873 Vienna World's Fair

Hancocks' first gallery opened at a corner of Bruton Street and New Bond Street, in London in 1849. Hancocks subsequently moved in 1917 to Vigo Street, in 1970 to Burlington Gardens, in 1998 to Burlington Arcade and, in 2024, to 62 St James's Street.

Hancocks exhibited at the Great Exhibition at the Crystal Palace in 1851, and at international exhibitions at Paris in 1867 and Vienna in 1873.

In 1998, Hancocks acquired the business of S.J. Rood, diamond merchants and jewellery manufacturers. S.J. Rood were themselves awarded a Royal Warrant by Mary of Teck, queen consort of King George V, in 1921 and were the creators of the "For...." series of rings which were given to Queen Mary’s ladies-in-waiting on their marriage.

== Royal Appointments and Warrants ==
On 13 August 1849, after eight months in business, Hancocks received the Royal Appointment of Queen Victoria. Many of the principal sovereigns of Europe also became regular patrons. There can be little doubt that the rapid expansion by Charles Hancock during the formative years of the Company led to Hancocks being entrusted with the design and production of the Victoria Cross on the inception of the award in 1856. This medal is still made exclusively by Hancocks.

In 1962 the Company was granted the Royal Warrant as Goldsmiths and Silversmiths to Queen Elizabeth The Queen Mother.

== S.J. Rood ==
S.J. Rood was established in London’s Burlington Arcade in 1873 by the Allen family. From 1900 onwards the firm was patronised by affluent Londoners and was awarded a Royal Warrant by Queen Mary.

It operated independently until acquired by Hancocks in 1998.

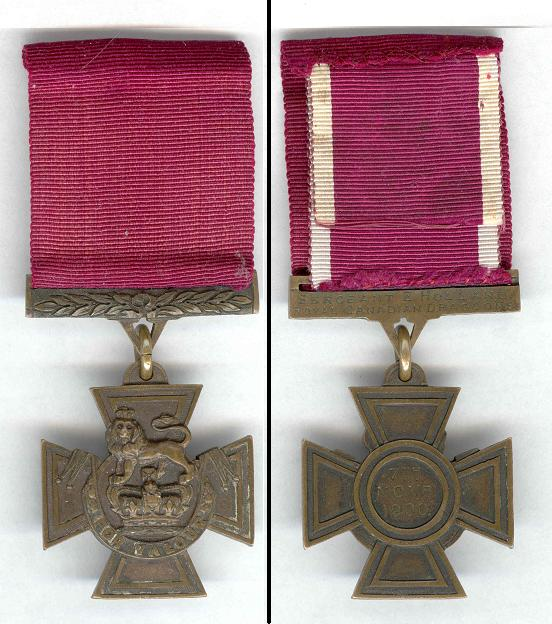
Victoria Cross made by Hancock & Co
