= Regents (disambiguation) =

Regents is the plural of regent, while Regent's is the possessive form.

Regents, The Regents, or Regent's may also refer to:

== Bands ==
- The Regents (Canadian band) formed in 1959
- Regents (quartet)
- The Regents (doo-wop band)
- The Regents (British band), new wave
- Regents, U.S. rock band, member Jason Hamacher

== Education ==
- Board of Regents, a type of governing body of institutions of higher learning in the United States
- Regent's College, an educational complex in Regent's Park, London, England
- Regents Examinations, standardized tests given to high school students through the New York State Department of Education
- Regents External Degree Program (1971–1984) and Regents College (1984–2001), programs of the University of the State of New York
- Regents School of Austin, a Christian school in Austin, Texas
- Regents Theological College, a theological college in Nantwich, Cheshire, England
- Regent's University London, a private university
- The Regent's School, an international coeducational boarding school on the eastern seaboard of Thailand

== Other uses ==
- Regent's Canal, canal in London, England, UK

== See also ==
- Regency (disambiguation)
- Regent (disambiguation)
- Regent's Park (disambiguation)
