= Regency (disambiguation) =

Regency may refer to:

== Government and politics ==
- Regency (government), the rule of a regent
- Regency (Indonesia), class of administrative subdivision inherited from the Regentschap of Dutch indirect rule
- Albany Regency, a political faction in the state of New York, c. 1820–50
- Hōjō Regency, during the Kamakura shogunate in Japan
- Régence, France 1715–23
- Regency Acts, various acts of the British parliament to provide for a regent
- Regency Era, also called "British Regency" or "The Regency", a reference to various stretches of time in the United Kingdom of Great Britain and Ireland, e.g., 1811–1820 or 1795 to 1837
- Regency period (Empire of Brazil), 1831–1840
- Kingdom of Hungary (1920–1946), known retrospectively as "The Regency" because of the lack of a monarch

== Genres or styles ==
Distinctive trends in British architecture, culture, fashion, literature, and politics during the British Regency period, e.g.:

- Regency architecture, the architecture of the British Regency period
- Regency novel, a novel genre set in the British Regency period
- Regency romance, a romance novel genre set in the British Regency period

== Brands and enterprises ==
=== Arts, entertainment, and media ===
- Regency Enterprises, a Los Angeles-based entertainment company
  - Regency Television, a joint venture between Regency Enterprises and Fox Television Studios
- Regency Records (Canada), a Toronto-based record label
- Regency Records (United States), a Los Angeles-based record label
- Regency TR-1, the first commercially produced transistor radio

=== Hospitality ===
- Hyatt Regency, a hotel brand owned by Hyatt Hotels Corporation
- Loews Regency San Francisco, California, one of the Loews Hotels
- The Regency, Denver, also known as "Regency Student Housing", in Colorado, USA, a student housing community which replaced the Regency Hotel

== Other uses ==
- Regency (greyhounds), a category 1, UK greyhound competition
- Regency (Jesuit), a three-year period of training for candidates to the Society of Jesus, during which the men live in and share the work of a local community of the Order
- Regency (Omaha), a neighborhood in Omaha, Nebraska
- Regency, South Africa, a suburb of Johannesburg, South Africa

== See also ==
- Regent (disambiguation)
- Regents (disambiguation)
