= Regent Park-Carolinas =

Coordinates: 35.075°N 80.919°W

Alternate uses: Regent Park (disambiguation)

Regent Park is the new name given to a portion of the former Heritage USA property in Fort Mill, South Carolina, just south of Charlotte, North Carolina that was originally developed by evangelist Jim Bakker and his then wife Tammy Faye Bakker Messner, founders of the PTL Ministry. The property was purchased out of bankruptcy by MUI Corporation (Malayan United Industries-Berhad) and redeveloped largely as a residential community. MUI's subsidiary, Regent Carolina Corporation added a golf course and golf academy and subdivided much of the undeveloped property for single-family homes and townhouses. In late 2004 Regent Carolina Corporation sold the remaining properties to area builders and developers and in February 2007 they sold their interest in the golf course and academy to a private corporation. In the year 2016, the golf course was sold and planned to be residentially developed in the future.
