= Glasshouse Street =

Street in London, England

Coordinates: 51.510497°N 0.137075°W

Glasshouse Street with Christmas lights

Glasshouse Street is a street in the Soho area of London. It runs from Piccadilly Circus in the east to Regent Street in the west, running behind the Quadrant of Regent Street.

== History and description ==
The street follows the path of an old country lane that was recorded as Suggen Lane in 1391. By 1585 it formed part of a course that ran roughly from where Piccadilly Circus to Oxford Circus are today. Building on the street began shortly after the Restoration. Its name first appears in ratebooks in 1678, and likely comes from a 17th-century association with William Sandys who worked for the Glass Sellers' Company. Previously it ran westwards towards Burlington House and up to Bond Street however these sections are now Vigo Street and Burlington Gardens, split from the current Glasshouse Street by Regent Street. It remained as a short street until it was combined with Marylebone and Tichborne Street in the 1860s. Both had been widened as a civic improvement in the early 18th century. On the latter had formerly stood Weeks's Mechanical Museum which exhibited mechanical curiosities.

The modern street is crossed by Air Street and is met by Brewer Street and Warwick Street. Its south is occupied entirely by the backs of the Quadrant of Regent Street and the north side largely by the redeveloped Regent Palace Hotel.

== See also ==
- Air Street
