= Denman House =

Building in London

General information
- Type: Residential
- Location: London, England
- Coordinates: 51°30′34″N 0°08′10″W
- Completed: 1903

Design and construction
- Architect: H. A. Woodington

Listed Building – Grade II
- Official name: Denman House
- Designated: 30 May 1972
- Reference no.: 1226675

Denman House is a Grade II listed building on Piccadilly at the corner with Air Street in London.

== History and description ==
Denman House replaced an older building which had housed the premises of Messrs. Denman and Co. and was completed in 1903 to designs by Harold Arthur Woodington. Its Portland stone facade is of a neo-Baroque appearance, a style which came to be prominently used on smaller buildings in the 1890s.

The Piccadilly Hotel built just a few years after has never had its original design by Richard Norman Shaw fully realised due to the presence of Denman House, which was able to maintain its lease. The plans of the hotel company included, if otherwise impossible to acquire, compulsory purchase of the land of Denman House. The latter was able to argue its right not to give up more land for street widening that it had to. The Piccadilly Hotel's intended eastern gable was therefore cut short both by Denman House and further for when Denman House was to be moved back from the street, which was carried out between 1912 and 1913. Shaw therefore had to revise his scheme to accommodate the new situation.

The issue was raised in the 1980s, as the lease on Denman House was coming to its expiry, of completing the originally intended complete designs by Shaw. This would have required the demolition of Denman House. It was however decided that Denman House, which had been awarded Grade II listed status in 1972, was of sufficient heritage value in its own right that it should be preserved. The building houses clothing retailer Cordings.

== See also ==
- The Dilly Hotel
