= Regent Palace Hotel =

Former hotel in London

Coordinates: 51.5104594°N 0.1354278°W

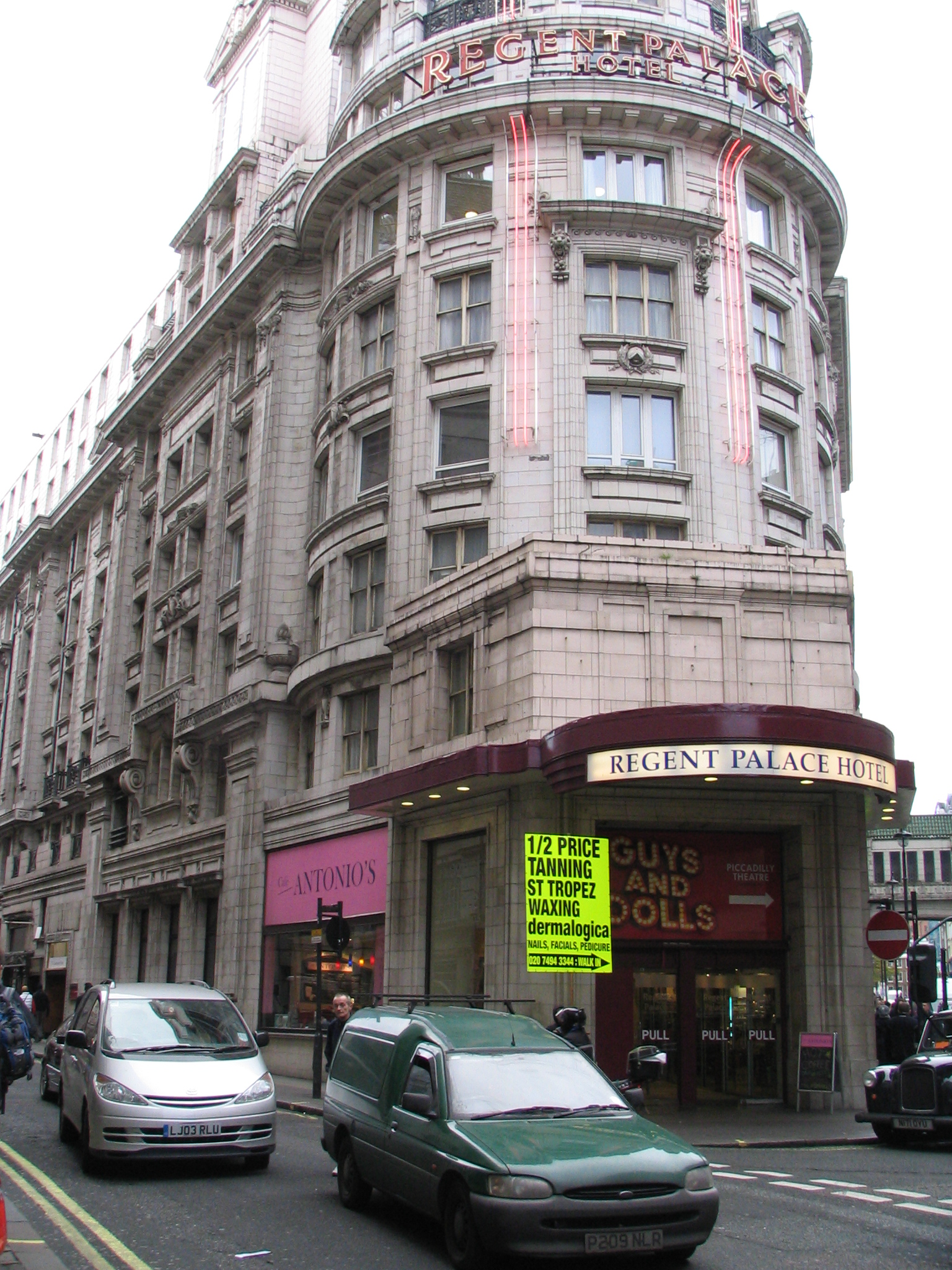
The Regent Palace Hotel in 2005

The Regent Palace Hotel was a large hotel in central London at 10 Glasshouse Street, close to Piccadilly Circus, between 1915 and 2006. It was designated as a Grade II listed building by English Heritage in 2004.

== History ==
In 1912, J Lyons & Co bought the unused property on the outer edge of the Quadrant in Regent Street. There they built a hotel called the Regent Palace, which opened on 26 May 1915. It took up the complete triangular block formed by Glasshouse, Brewer and Sherwood Streets and rose nine floors high, plus a basement and sub-basement. It contained 1,028 bedrooms, but even in its later years had only communal bathrooms and toilets. When opened in 1915, it was the largest hotel in Europe.

The English architect Oliver Percy Bernard was the chief designer of the hotel's interior, having been enlisted to help by Lyons in the early 1930s. Historic England in 2004 considered the interior of the hotel to be one of the most important features of the building. The entrance to the hotel was later bought by the Victoria and Albert Museum who preserved it as a significant piece of period design.

In 1940, during the Battle of Britain, the Regent Palace was frequented by, among others, Canadian airmen, who found it a good place to meet women:

"Since the Canadians had invaded London [the Regent Palace] had become known as the Canadian Riding School, but Canadians were not the only boys to get riding lessons there. . . . Pilots were glamorous in London and there were single women in the downstairs bar of the Riding School who . . . did not take much charming by a man wearing wings."

Whilst Hackney ARP Warden Thomas E. Browne recorded in his diary Saturday 11th October 1941 of his visit with friends,"Surprising number of foreign uniforms at the hotel."

Later, during the Blitz on London, the hotel was hit by several bombs, but little damage was done.

In postwar years it deteriorated in spite of many attempts to refurbish it, and became one of the cheaper hotels of London, catering for group tours. The hotel closed on 31 December 2006. The building was largely demolished in 2010-2012 and was replaced by part of the Quadrant 3 project and renamed "Air W1".

The lower floors now form the Brasserie Zedel.

== Public rooms ==
The public area of the hotel was situated mainly on the ground and first floors. The main entrance was on the apex at the intersection of Glasshouse and Sherwood Streets. The hotel and its neon sign, high above the door, were visible from Piccadilly Circus. The floor plan altered slightly over the years, but in the 1980s was as follows: immediately after entering there was a news kiosk on the left; on the right was a sandwich and fruit bar. Further on that side was the head-porter's counter and the reception. Opposite these counters were three very small lifts, with a marble stairway to all floors between them. Further in the vestibule was a gift shop and a theatre booking agency, followed by a hall with the entry to a pub on the left and to the coffee shop/breakfast room on the right.

Also in this hall were telephones and an entrance to a stairway leading to the residents' lounge (on the first floor) and the hairdressing salon in the lower floor. The vestibule ended in swing doors leading to an area under a dome with a classic parquet floor. Beyond this was the restaurant, decorated in Art Deco style. The dome was of cut glass, in a triangular open central court; the main passageways on the upper floors were also triangular in layout.

== Upper floors ==
The upper floors contained the bedrooms, mainly singles and doubles, without bathrooms. The rather cell-like singles were very narrow, just wide enough to contain the bed and room to use the wash basin. Beyond the bed there was a chair and small table, a closet and the window. Even the inner rooms had natural light as they opened onto the central court, whose triangular shape prevented direct overlook. The double and twin rooms were much wider with more furniture. There were shared bathrooms and toilets in each passageway. A bell in each bedroom summoned a floor maid who would then draw a bath, supply hot towels and escort the resident to the bathroom and, after use, clean it.

== Staff ==
At its peak, the Regent Palace employed over a thousand staff. Many of these were accommodated in a separate staff building on the east side of Sherwood Street. This building also contained the laundry and could be reached by an over-street bridge at the third floor level, still there in 2020. The staff building became the Backpacker Hostel.

== Modern history ==
The hotel was designated as a Grade II listed building by English Heritage in 2004.
