= Vigo Street =

Street in the City of Westminster, London

Coordinates: 51.5103°N 0.1390°W

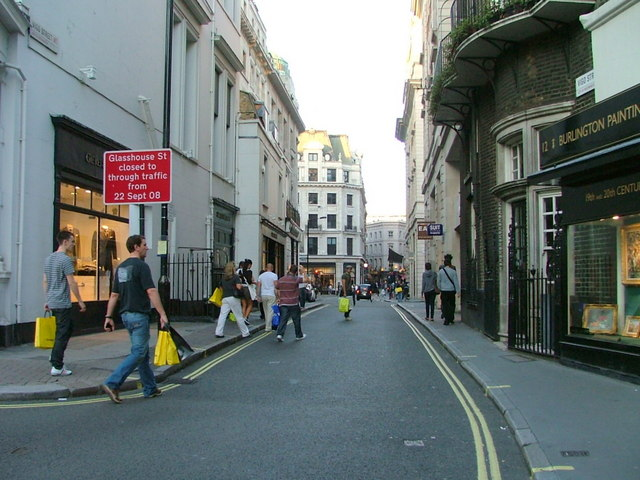
The start of Vigo Street, looking east towards Regent Street. The Penguin Books plaque is on the brick building on the right.

Vigo Street (originally Vigo Lane) is a short street in central London that is named after the Anglo-Dutch naval victory over the French and Spanish in the 1702 Battle of Vigo Bay. It has important literary connections.

== Location ==
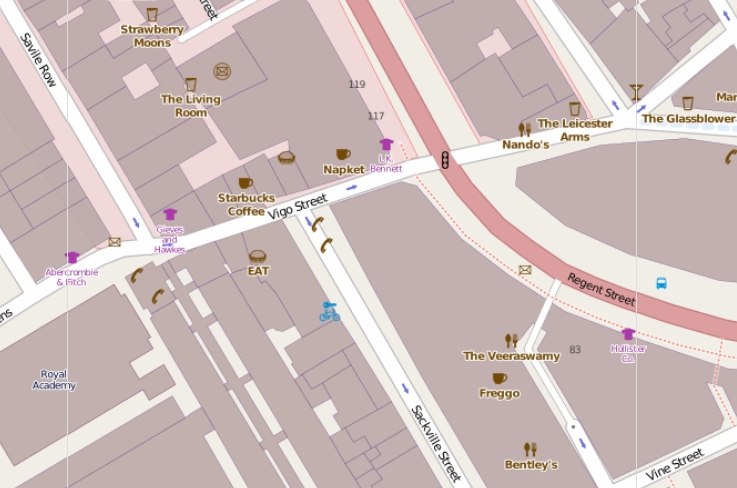
Location of Vigo Street within London.

The street runs between Regent Street and the junction of Burlington Gardens and Savile Row. Sackville Street leads south, half way along Vigo Street. The rear entrance to Albany is wedged between the end of Vigo Street and the start of Burlington Gardens at 10 and 12 Burlington Gardens.

== History ==
Originally, the whole roadway from what is now Bond Street to the current Glasshouse Street, including the current Vigo Street, was called Glasshouse Street.

Following the Anglo-Dutch naval victory over the French and Spanish in the 1702 Battle of Vigo Bay, part of Glasshouse Street was renamed Vigo Lane. Later it became Vigo Street, but the name "Vigo Lane" was still used in Elmes's London Streets as late as 1831.

The part of Vigo Street behind Burlington House was renamed Burlington Gardens by 1831.

== Literary connections ==
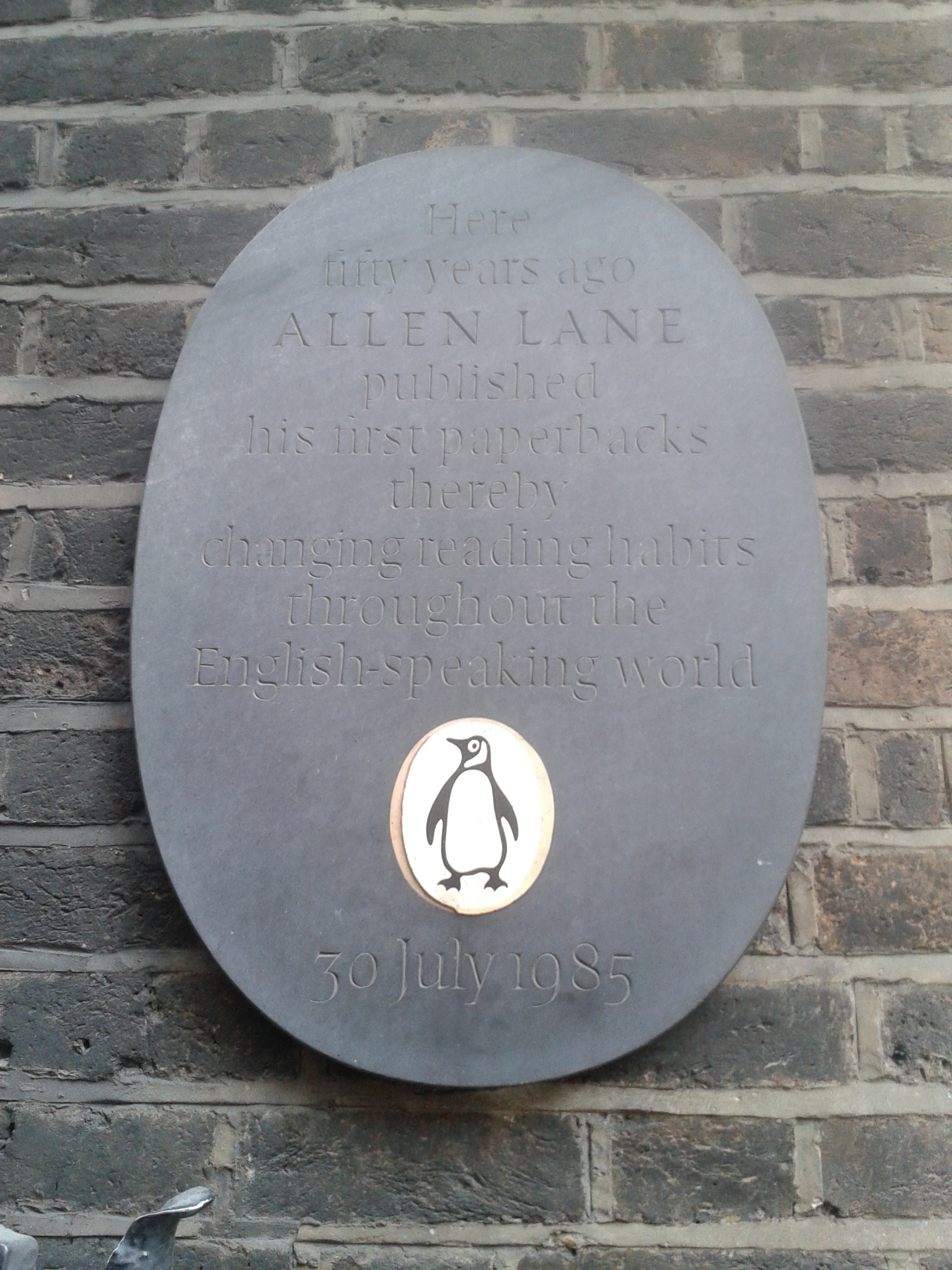
The plaque marking the fiftieth anniversary of the founding of Penguin Books at 8 Vigo Street.

Publishers John Lane and Elkin Mathews were in partnership in Vigo Street. Together they published the infamous literary journal The Yellow Book volumes one and two in 1894. Later they founded The Bodley Head and continued to publish the work until it ceased in 1897.

When the partnership between Lane and Mathews ended, both continued to have premises in Vigo Street and Mathews published the first editions of a number of important literary works, including The Wind Among the Reeds by W. B. Yeats in 1899 Chamber Music by James Joyce in 1907. He also published Lionel Johnson, John Masefield, J.M. Synge and Ezra Pound.

It was from 8 Vigo Street that Allen Lane founded Penguin Books as part of Bodley Head in 1935. In 1985, Penguin erected a plaque on number 8 to mark the fiftieth anniversary of the Penguin paperback.

In Conan Doyle's The Lost World, 1912, a South American adventure, Lord John Roxton, turns down Vigo street and 'through the dingy portals of the famous aristocratic rookery' to his Albany chambers. Doyle describes his rooms, art and gun collection, in great detail.

In Graham Greene's The End of the Affair, 1951, the private detective agency Bendrix approaches is located at 159 Vigo Street.
