= Regent (German brand) =

German clothing brand

Regent 1946 GmbH
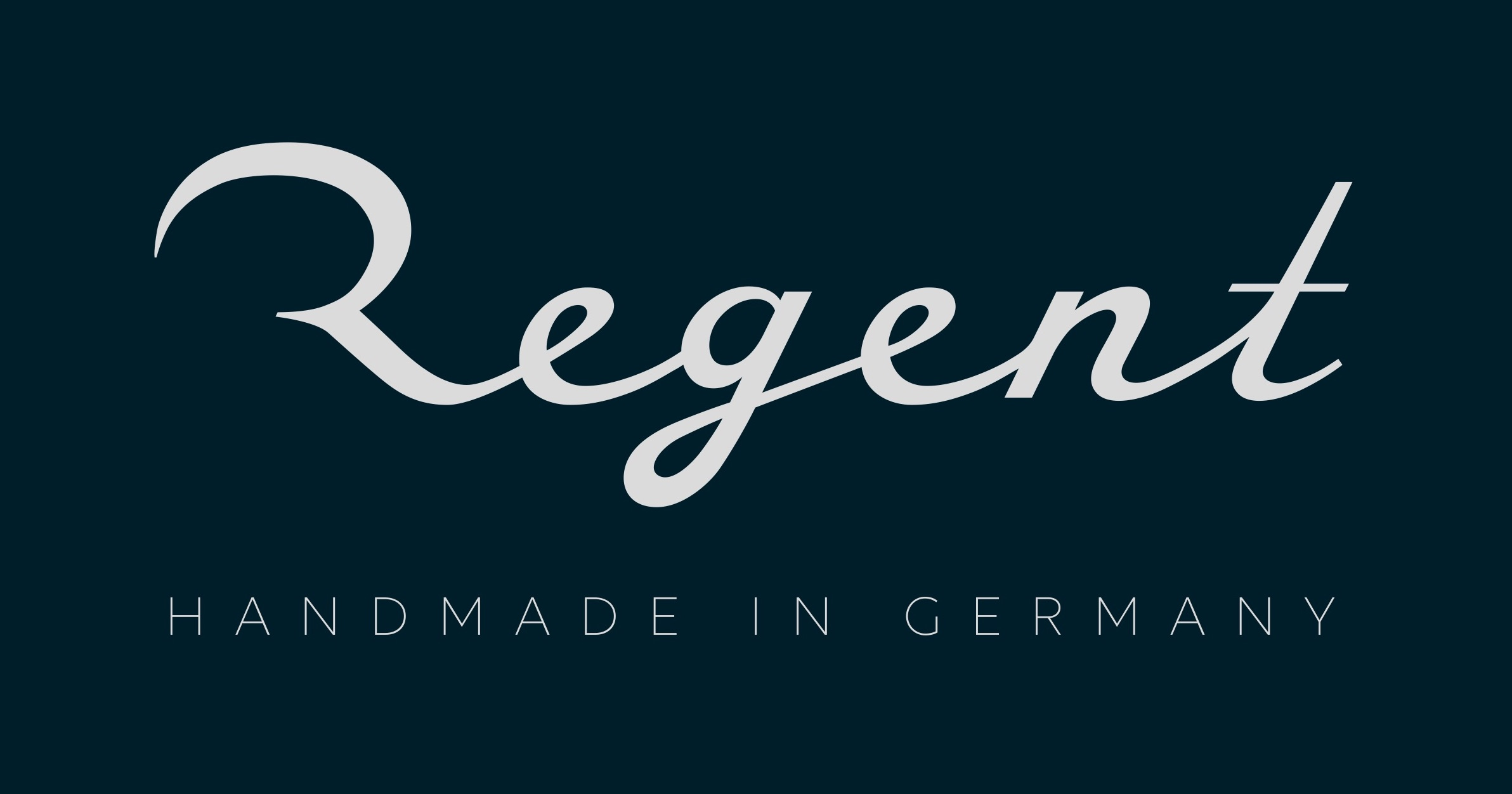
- Industry: Fashion
- Founded: 1946
- Headquarters: Weißenburg in Bayern, Germany
- Area served: Worldwide
- Key people: Philippe E. Brenninkmeijer, Andreas Martin Meier
- Products: Luxury men's clothing
- Website: www.regent.de

Regent is a German high-end fashion manufacturer founded in 1946. It specializes in the manufacturing of handmade men's suits.

== History ==
Regent was founded in 1946 by Henryk Barig and Michael Aisenstadt in Weißenburg in Bayern, Germany. In the beginning, the company was specialized in producing shirts. Shortly after they focused on the production of high quality men's suits.
