= Burlington Gardens =

Street in City of Westminster, London

Coordinates: 51.5099°N 0.1409°W

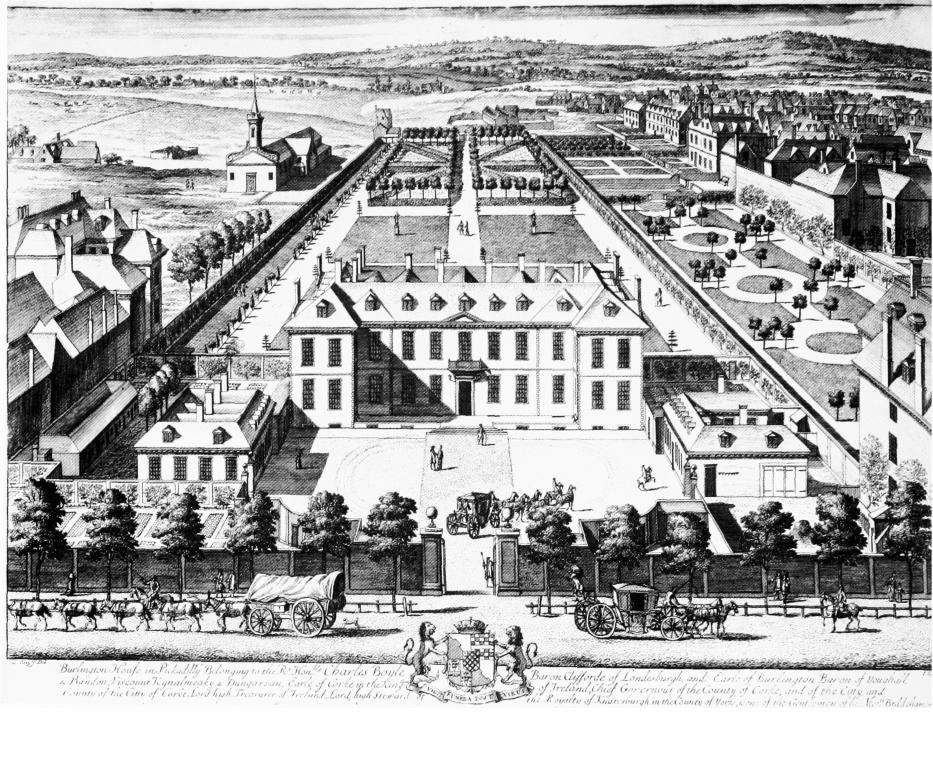
A view of Burlington House in the 1690s, before the area was fully developed, with the Burlington Gardens at the far end

Burlington Gardens is a street in central London, on land that was once part of the Burlington Estate.

== Location ==
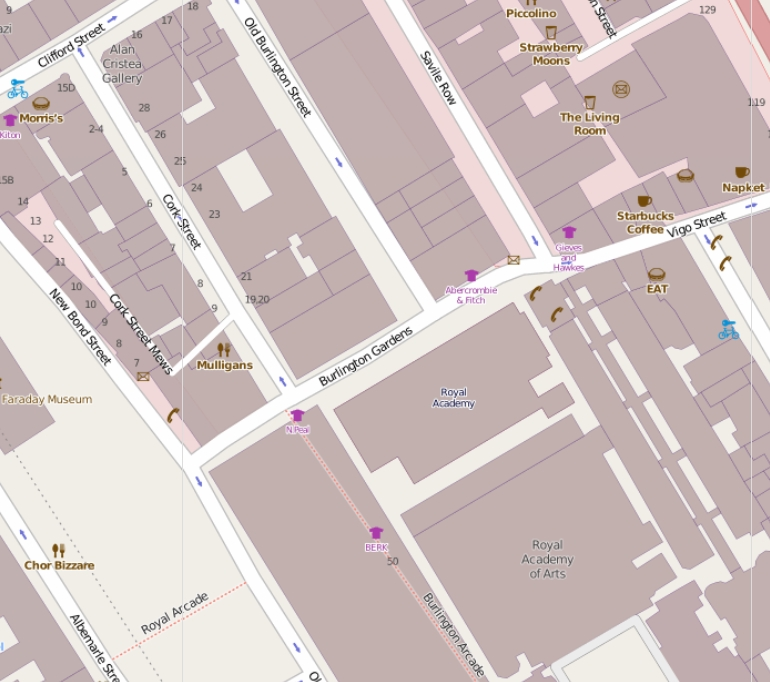
The immediate vicinity of Burlington Gardens

The street is immediately to the north of the Royal Academy of Arts and joins Old Bond Street and New Bond Street in the west and Vigo Street in the east. Cork Street, Savile Row and Old Burlington Street all run north from Burlington Gardens.

On the south side of Burlington Gardens is one end of the Burlington Arcade and the rear of Albany at 10 and 12 Burlington Gardens, which is wedged between the end of Burlington Gardens and the start of Vigo Street. This part of Albany was designed by Henry Holland.

== History ==
Burlington Gardens was once part of Vigo Lane (later renamed Vigo Street) which originally ran all the way from Bond Street to Glasshouse Street before the part behind Burlington House was renamed Burlington Gardens by 1831.

And before it was either Vigo Street or Lane, the whole roadway from what is now Bond Street to the current Glasshouse Street was called Glasshouse Street.

== Listed buildings ==
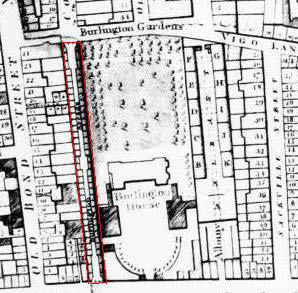
1819 map showing Burlington Gardens at the top.

Burlington Gardens contains a number of historic buildings. Both number six and number seven are Grade II* listed by English Heritage.

=== Atkinsons Building ===
Atkinsons Building, which includes 2 and 4 Burlington Gardens, is on the corner of Old Bond Street and Burlington Gardens. It was built in 1926 in the Gothic Revival style and includes Arts and Crafts detailing. It is Grade II-listed by English Heritage.

=== 6 Burlington Gardens ===
6 Burlington Gardens is used by the Royal Academy and is the largest building in the street. It was built in 1866–67 on the garden of Burlington House to a design by Sir James Pennethorne. It was originally the headquarters of the University of London. From 1900 it was occupied by the Civil Service Commission. It then became the Museum of Mankind before being taken over by the Royal Academy. It has an Italianate facade, and the portico includes four statues by Joseph Durham of Newton, Bentham, Milton and Harvey, representing Science, Law, Arts and Medicine.

=== 7 Burlington Gardens ===
7 Burlington Gardens is on the north side of the street and was built in 1721–23 to designs by the Italian architect Giacomo Leoni. It was first occupied by the Duke of Queensberry, and the poet John Gay also lived there. It was originally known as Queensberry House, but became Uxbridge House after the Earl of Uxbridge bought it in 1785. From 1785–89, it was extended by the architects John Vardy the Younger and Joseph Bonomi the Elder for Lord Uxbridge. It later became home to the Marquess of Anglesey, the Bank of England and the Royal Bank of Scotland. It was an Abercrombie & Fitch store, the first in Europe.

== Shops in Burlington Gardens ==
- Abercrombie & Fitch. Fashion retailers.
- Blades. Men's fashion by Rupert Lycett Green. (closed)
- Ede & Ravenscroft. Ceremonial outfitters.

== Gallery ==
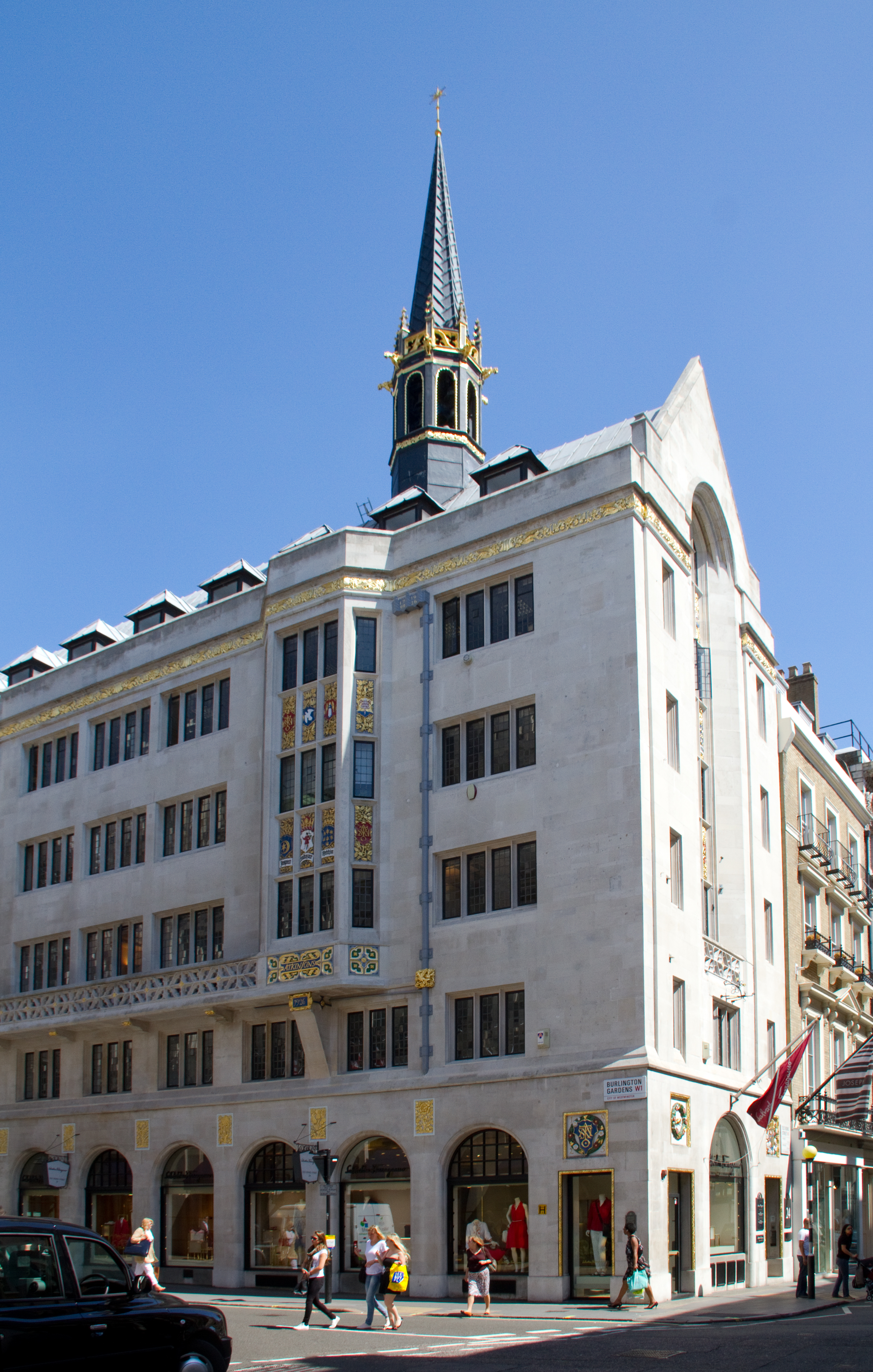
Atkinsons Building

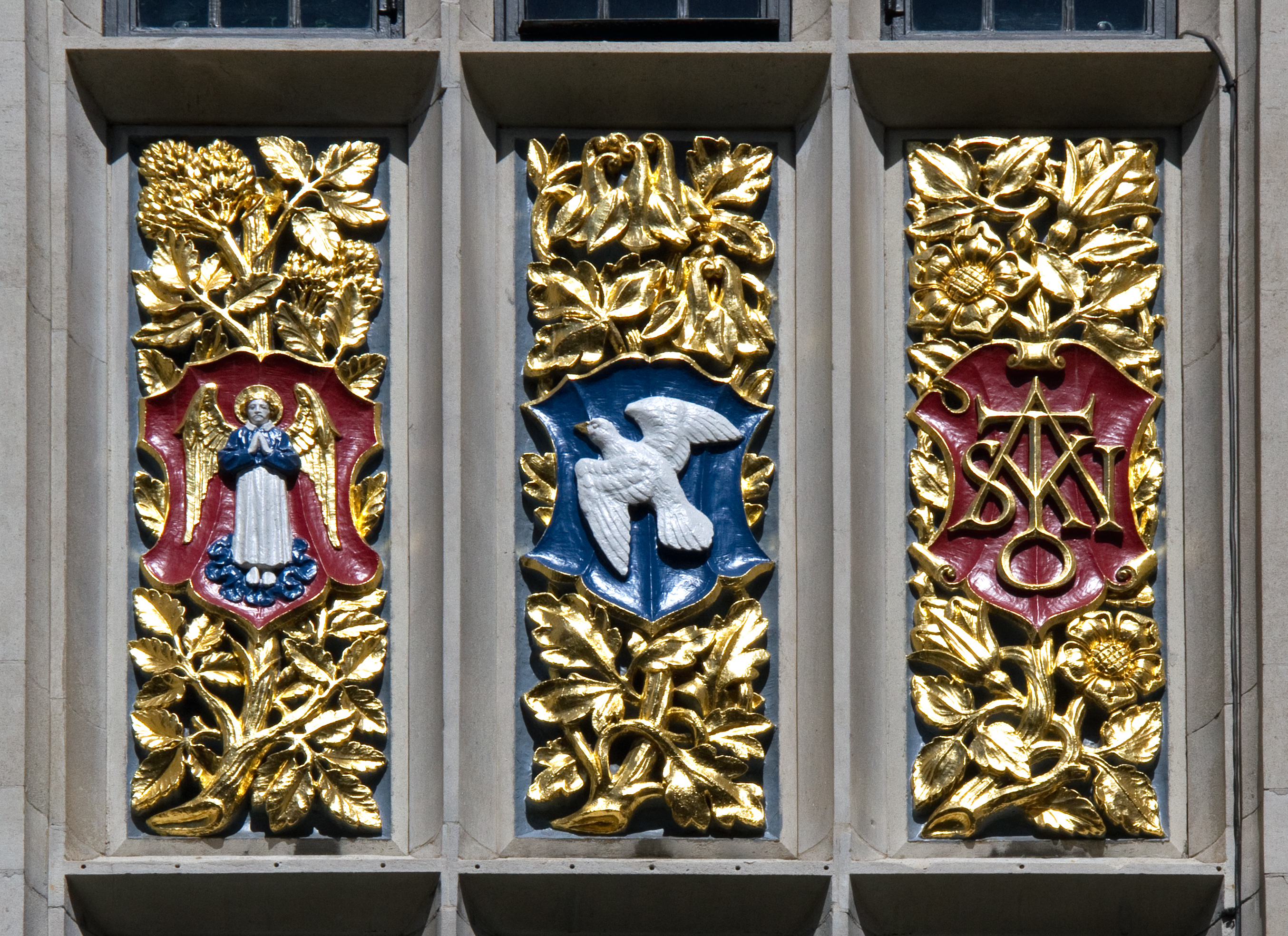
Detail from Atkinsons Building

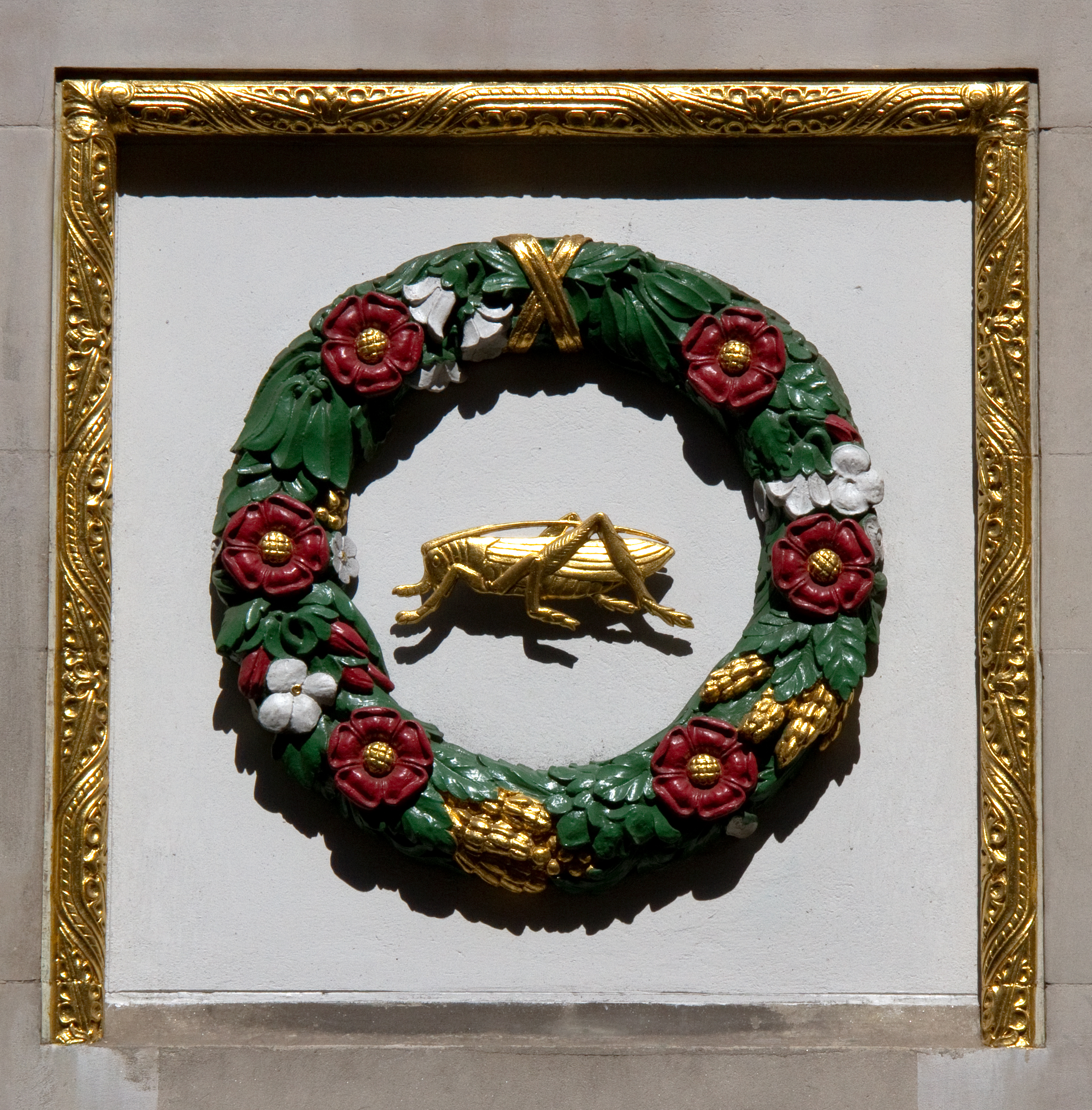
Detail from Atkinsons Building

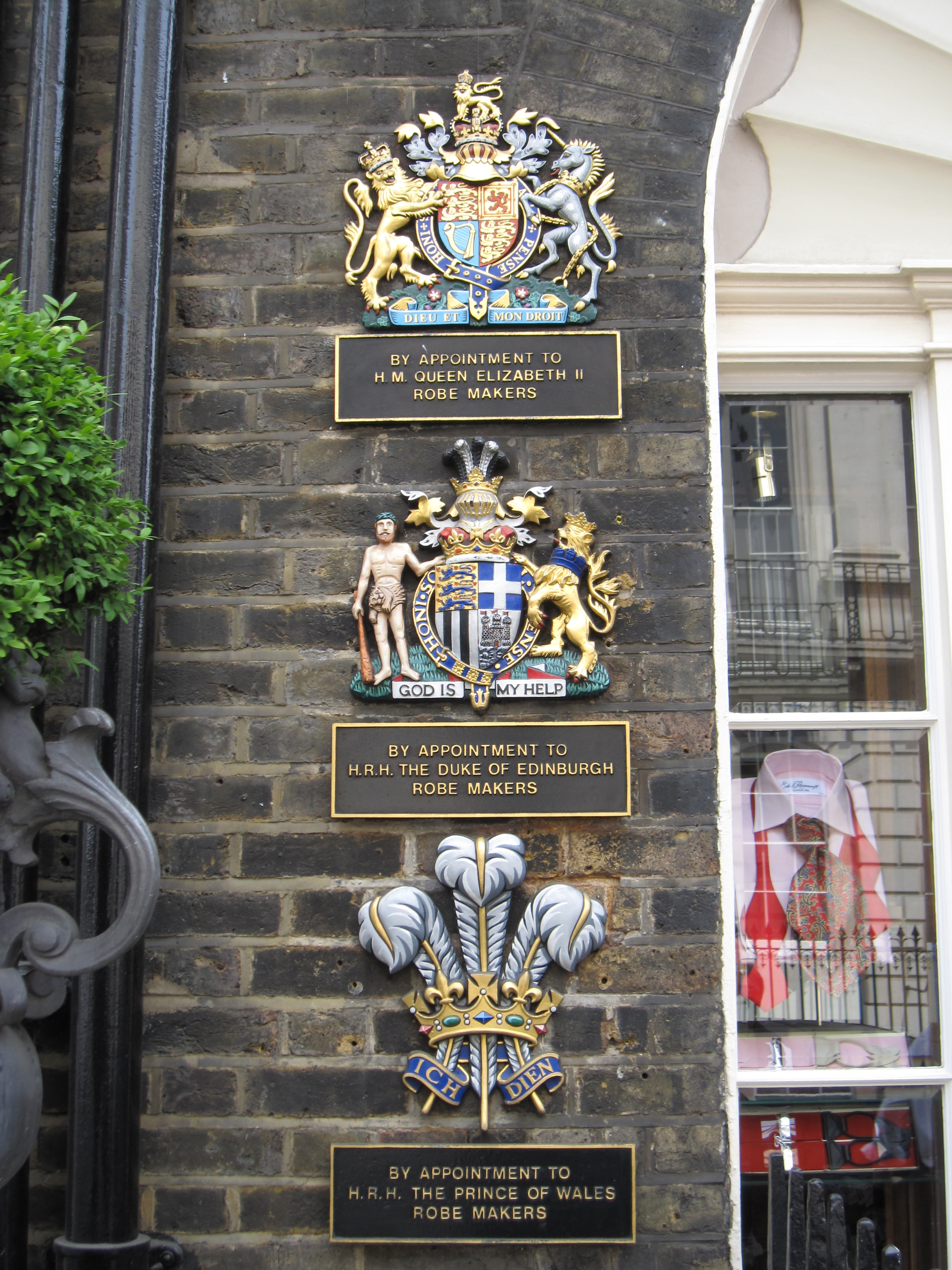
The Royal Warrants held by Ede & Ravenscroft displayed at their Burlington Gardens shop

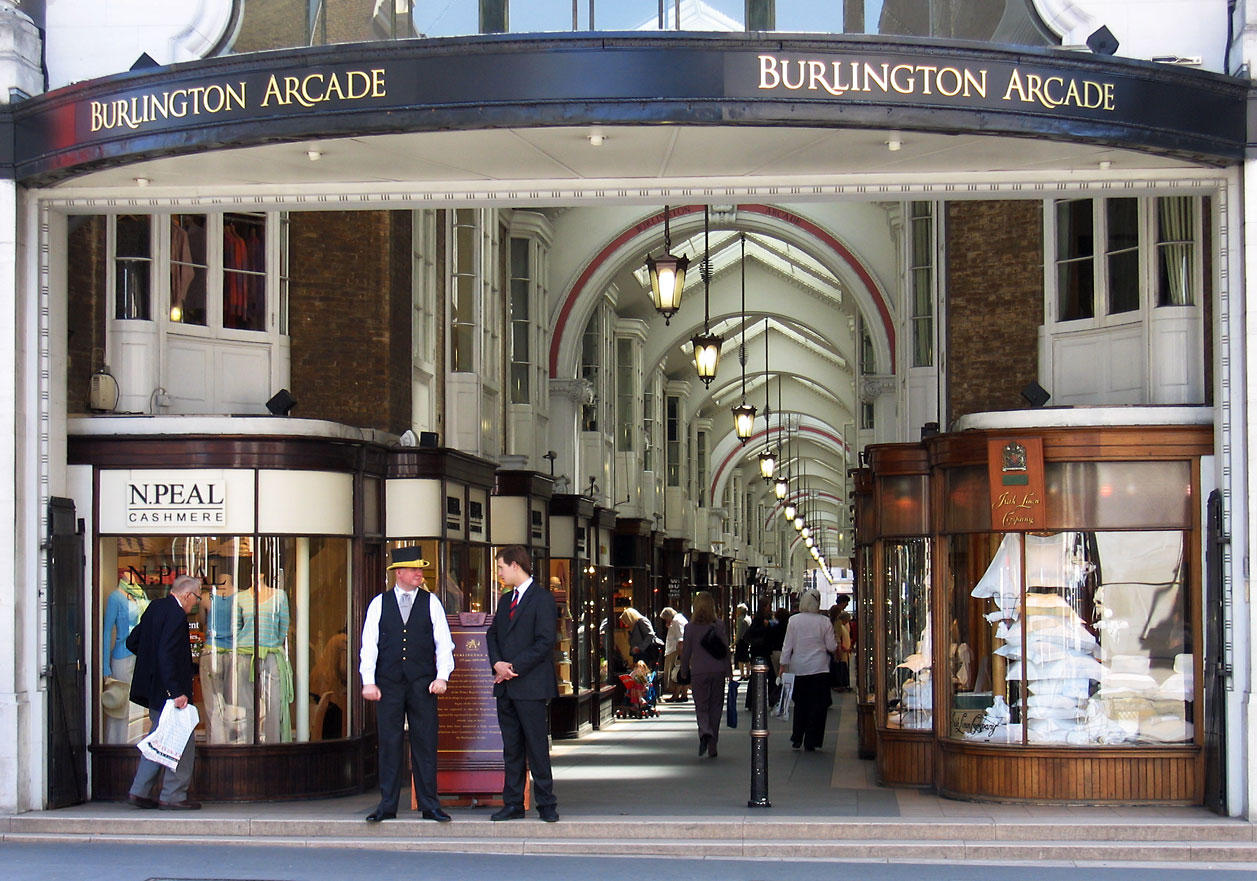
The north entrance to the Burlington Arcade

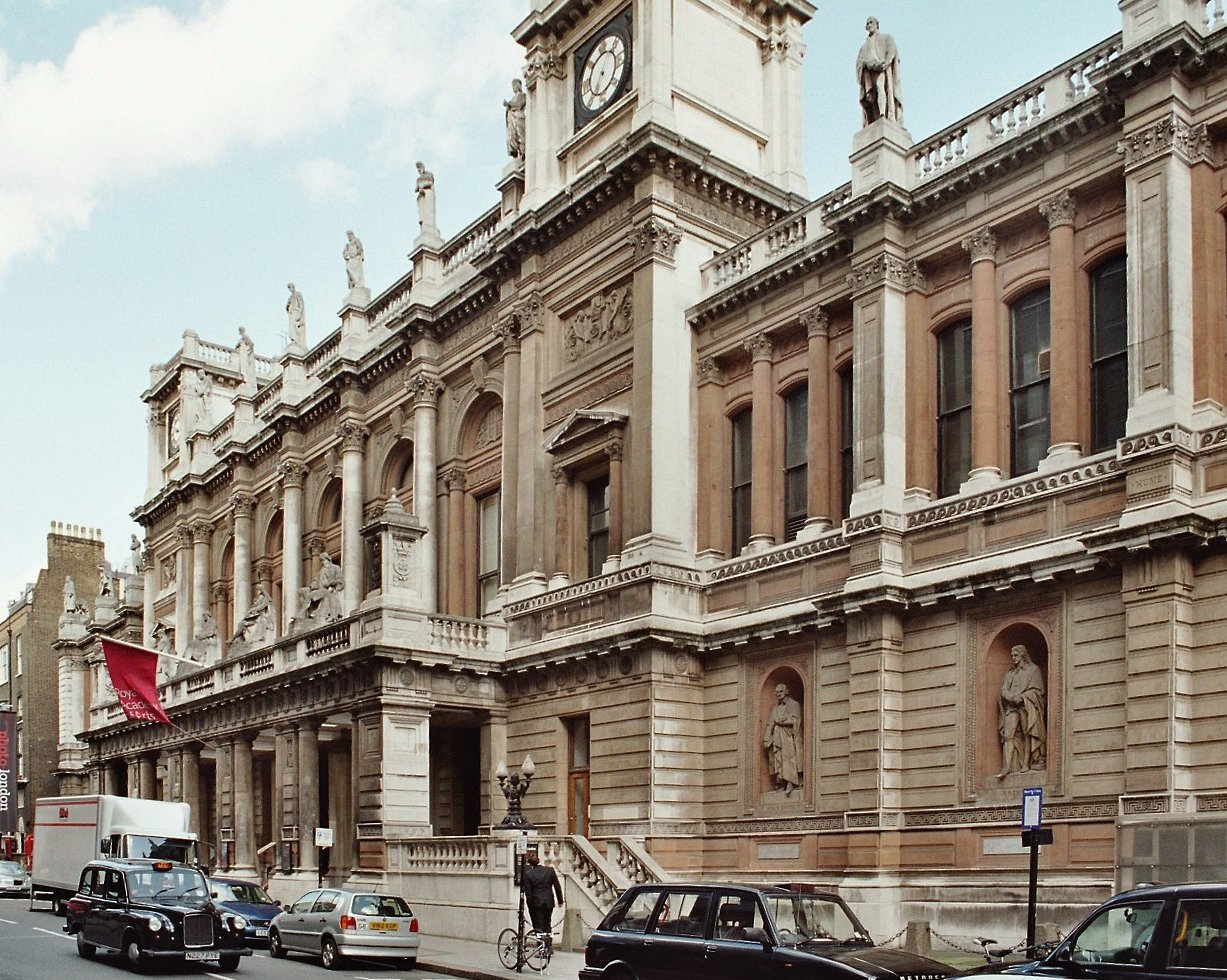
6 Burlington Gardens, on the south side of the street. In use by the Royal Academy of Arts, it includes statues by Joseph Durham.

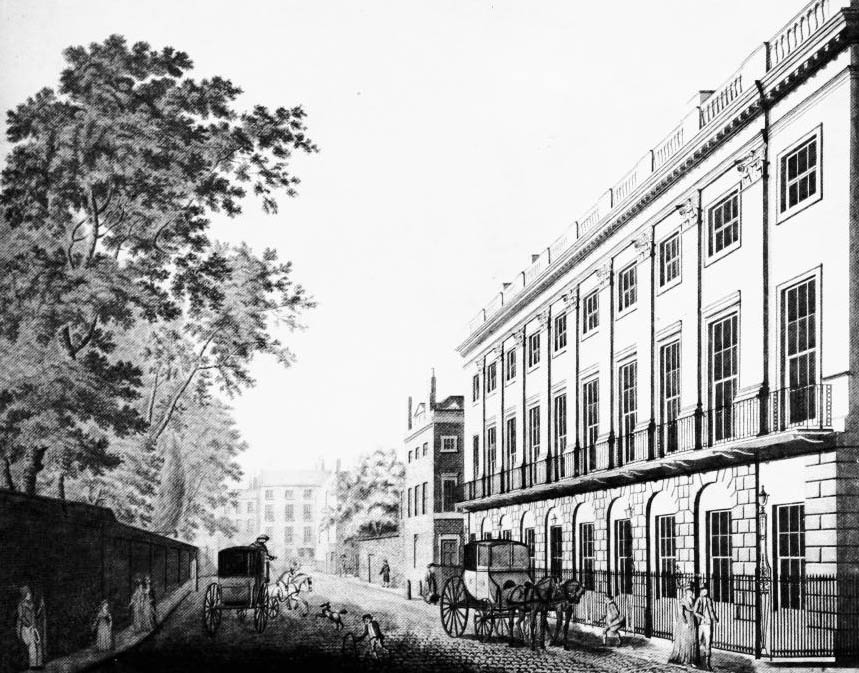
Queensberry (Uxbridge) House, c. 1790
