= Regent's Park (disambiguation) =

Regent's Park, Regents Park or Regent Park can mean:

== Regent's Park ==
- Regent's Park, a park in London, England
  - Regent's Park tube station, a London Underground station
  - Regent's Park Estate, a housing estate east of Regent's Park
  - Regent's Park Barracks, British Army barracks in Albany Street
  - Regent's University London, a private non-profit university in Regent's Park
  - Regent's Park (Camden ward), an electoral ward in the London Borough of Camden
  - Regent's Park (Westminster ward), an electoral ward in the City of Westminster
- Regent's Park College, Oxford, a permanent private hall of the University of Oxford, England
- Regent's Park, a neighbourhood of Glasgow, Scotland

== Regents Park ==
- Regents Park (Chicago), an apartment complex in Chicago, United States
- Regents Park, Gauteng, a suburb of Johannesburg, South Africa
- Regents Park, Southampton, a suburb of Southampton, England
- Regents Park, New South Wales, a suburb of Sydney, Australia
- Regents Park, Queensland, a suburb of Logan City, Australia

== Regent Park ==
- Regent Park, a neighbourhood in Toronto, Canada
- Regent Park-Carolinas, a neighborhood and golf course community in Fort Mill, South Carolina
- Regent Park, Kolkata, a neighbourhood in Kolkata, India
