= Regent Street =

Shopping street in London

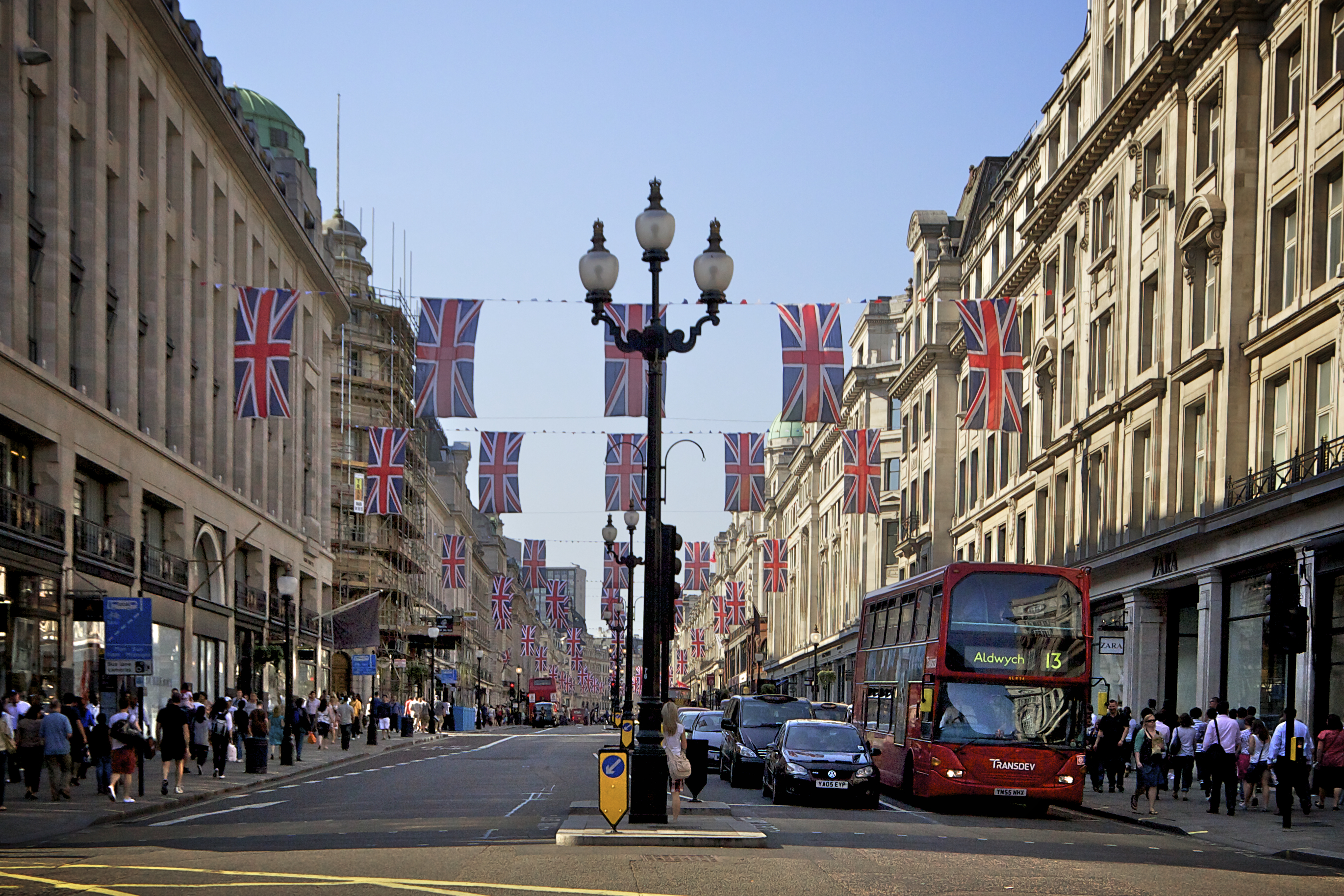
- Looking north along Regent Street in April 2011, with Union Flags hung to celebrate the wedding of the Duke and Duchess of Cambridge

- Location within City of Westminster
- Part of: A4, A4201
- Namesake: George, Prince Regent of the United Kingdom
- Maintained by: Transport for London
- Length: 0.8 mi (1.3 km)
- Location: London, United Kingdom
- Nearest tube station: Oxford Circus; Piccadilly Circus; Charing Cross
- Coordinates: 51.5108°N 0.1387°W

Other
- Designer: John Nash, James Burton
- Known for: Liberty; Hamleys; Apple Store; University of Westminster
- Website: www.regentstreetonline.com

Regent Street is a major shopping street in the West End of London. It is named after George, the Prince Regent (later George IV) and was laid out under the direction of the architect John Nash and the owner James Burton. It runs from Waterloo Place in St James's at the southern end, through Piccadilly Circus and Oxford Circus, to All Souls Church. From there Langham Place and Portland Place continue the route to Regent's Park.

Burton's street layout, which was completed in 1825 and was an early example of town planning in England, replaced earlier roads including Swallow Street, and has survived despite that its buildings except All Souls Church were replaced during the late 19th century. The street is known for its flagship retail stores, including Liberty, Hamleys, Jaeger and the Apple Store. The Royal Polytechnic Institution, now the University of Westminster, has been based on Regent Street since 1838.

== Route ==
Regent Street is approximately 0.8 miles (1.3 km) long and begins at a junction with Charles II Street as a continuation of Waterloo Place. (Note: The section between Waterloo Place and Piccadilly Circus; colloquially known as "'Lower Regent Street" was officially renamed to "Regent Street St James" 2014.) It runs north to Piccadilly Circus, where it turns left before curving round the Quadrant to head north again, meeting Oxford Street at Oxford Circus. It ends at a junction with Cavendish Place and Mortimer Street near the BBC Broadcasting House, with the road ahead being Langham Place, followed by Portland Place.

The southern section of the road is one-way northbound and part of the A4, a major road through West London. From Piccadilly Circus northwards, it is numbered A4201, though in common with roads inside the London congestion charging zone, the number does not appear on signs.

Nearby tube stations are Charing Cross, Piccadilly Circus and Oxford Circus; the lattermost being one of the busiest underground stations in London, and is where three main lines (Central, Bakerloo and Victoria) meet. Bus routes 23, 139 and 94 all serve Lower Regent Street before continuing onto Regent Street, except the 23 which turns left to serve Piccadilly after Jermyn Street.

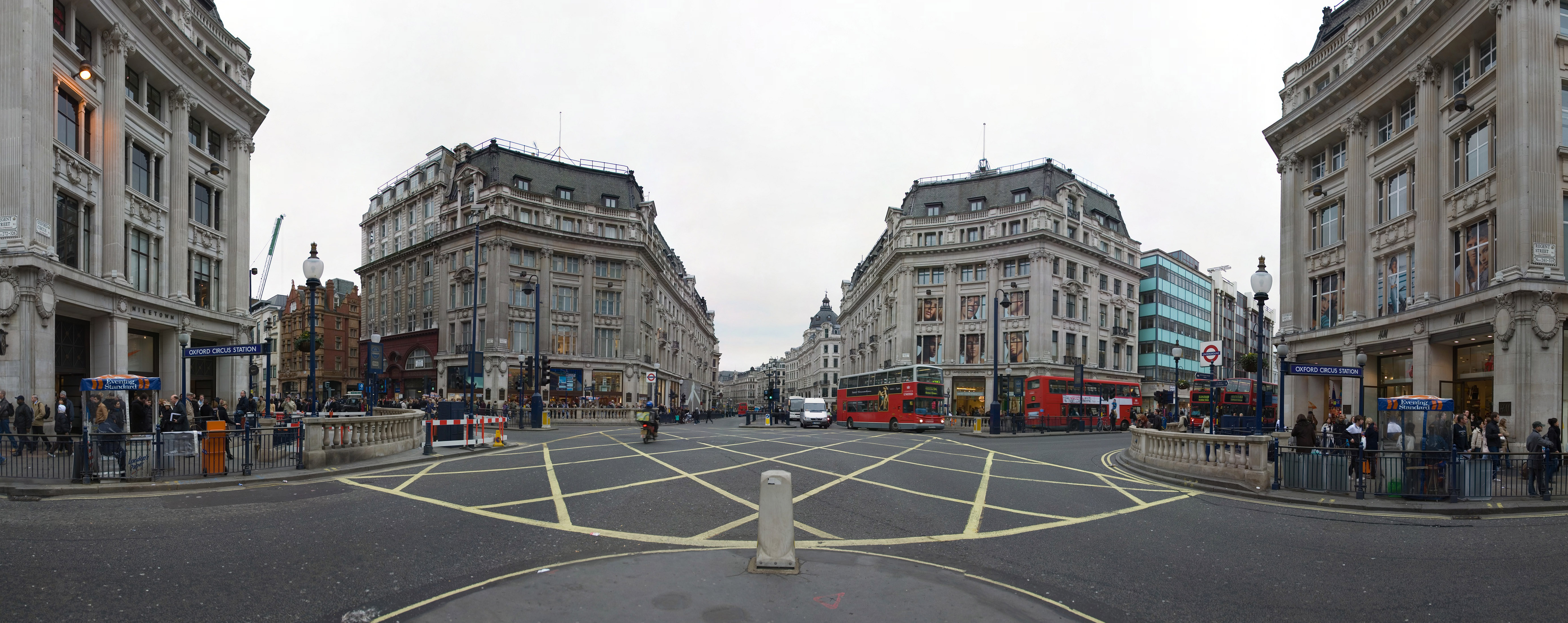
Panoramic view of Oxford Circus; the location where Oxford Street meets Regent Street

== History ==
=== Beginnings: 1811–1825 ===
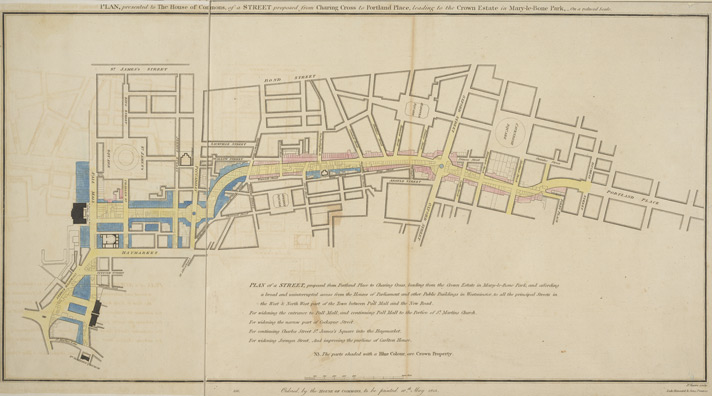
Regent Street proposal, published 1813, titled "PLAN, presented to the House of Commons, of a STREET proposed from CHARING CROSS to PORTLAND PLACE, leading to the Crown Estate in Marylebone Park"

Regent Street was one of the first planned developments of London. An ordered structure of London streets, replacing the mediaeval layout, had been planned since just after the Great Fire of London (1666) when Sir Christopher Wren and John Evelyn drew plans for rebuilding the city on the classical formal model. After a lack of progress, houses were rebuilt on the old street network anyway.

In 1766, John Gwynn complained in London and Westminster Improved that there was a lack of planning throughout the West End and that it would be useful to construct a thoroughfare linking Marylebone Park (now Regent's Park) with the Prince Regent's Carlton House. John Fordyce was appointed as Surveyor-General to the First Commissioner of Woods and Forests in 1793 and concluded that there should be a suitable road in place by 1811, when the lease for Marylebone Park ran out and ownership reverted to the Crown. It was hoped the road could link Pall Mall and the Haymarket, which had declined and became downmarket. A further problem was increased congestion around Charing Cross, which would benefit from road improvements.

The street was designed by John Nash (who had been appointed to the Office of Woods and Forests in 1806 and previously served as an adviser to the Prince Regent) and by developer James Burton who owned the majority of the street. Nash proposed his own plans for the street in 1810 following the death of Fordyce, envisioning broad, architecturally distinguished thoroughfares and public spaces, and planned to construct a straight boulevard as seen in French cities, but this was not possible because of land ownership issues. Nash's final design resulted in a road situated further west than on previous plans, and Nash believed the road would run down a de facto line separating the upper middle class and landed gentry in Mayfair with the working class in Soho.

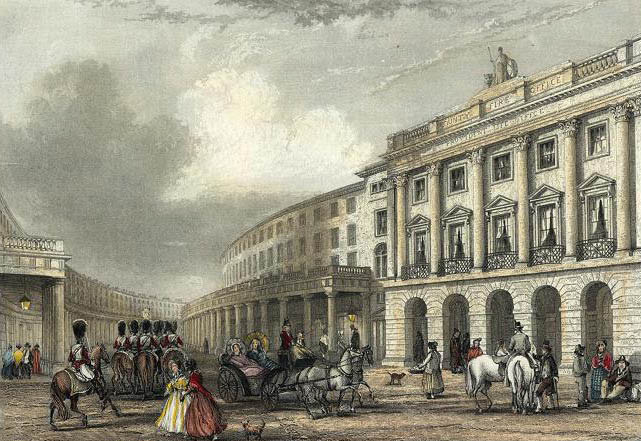
The Quadrant, Regent Street in 1837, seen from Piccadilly Circus. The buildings have since been replaced.

The construction of the northern section of the New Street involved demolishing most of the existing Swallow Street, which had become run down and was an ideal candidate for regeneration. The road was designed to curve east between Oxford Street and Piccadilly so that it did not meet St James's Square, and the circuses allowed visual continuity down the street. The central section, known as the Quadrant, was designed for "shops appropriated to articles of fashion and taste," and was Nash's centrepiece for the street. It was built with a colonnade of cast-iron columns, allowing commuters to walk along the street without having to face bad weather. The buildings along the Quadrant had different facades, a deliberate choice by Nash to break away from the uniform design of the previous century and a pragmatic means of using what building materials were available and what clients wanted. The road was planned to end outside Carlton House in Pall Mall, the residence of the Prince of Wales. Nash insisted that businesses on the street would be of high-quality to rival nearby Bond Street; common trades such as butchers or greengrocers were not allowed.

New Street Act 1813
- Act of Parliament
- Parliament of the United Kingdom
- Long title: An Act for making a more convenient Communication from Mary le Bone Park and the Northern Parts of the Metropolis, in the Parish of Saint Mary le Bone to Charing Cross, within the Liberty of Westminster; and for making a more convenient Sewage for the same.
- Citation: 53 Geo. 3. c. 121
- Territorial extent: United Kingdom

Dates
- Royal assent: 10 July 1813
- Commencement: 10 July 1813 (Note: The Acts of Parliament (Commencement) Act 1793.)
Other legislation
| Amended by | Crown Lands Act 1820 |

Status: Amended

Text of statute as originally enacted

The design was adopted by an act of Parliament, the New Street Act 1813 (53 Geo. 3. c. 121), which permitted the commissioners to borrow £600,000 for building and construction. The street was intended for commercial purposes and it was expected that most of the income would come from private capital. Nash took responsibility for design and valuation of all properties. Construction of the road required demolishing numerous properties, disrupting trade and polluting the air with dust. Existing tenants had first offer to purchase leases on the new properties. The Treasury supported the proposal because, in the aftermath of the Napoleonic Wars, there was an urgent need for the government to create jobs. Government expenditure was low because the design relied heavily on private developers, such as Nash himself. The buildings were let on 99-year leases, as was common at the time, and income could be recouped in the form of ground rent.

=== James Burton ===
James Burton, the pre-eminent Georgian London property developer, designed and constructed 191 of the houses of Regent Street, and their joining archways. Five of the largest blocks of Regent Street were purchased by Burton in 1817. Burton's houses on Regent Street are No. 4 to No. 12; No. 17 to No. 25; No. 106 to No. 128; No. 132 to No. 154; No. 133 to No. 167; No. 171 to No. 195; and No. 295 to No. 319. These were built, together with Carlton Chambers, between 1817 and 1820. Burton also built between Leicester Street and No. 129 Swallow Street in 1820. Burton built the east side of Regent Street in 1821, and the west side of Regent Street, specifically the part between the Quadrant and Oxford Street, and its archways, in 1822. Burton built north of Old Burlington Street, and the east side of the street between Chapel Court and the entrance to the King Street Chapel SW1, in 1822. Burton also designed and built Regent Street St. James (Lower Regent Street), and Waterloo Place, St. James's, whose facades he modelled on those of the Place Vendome in Paris, between 1815 and 1816.

=== Other architects ===
The vast majority of the street was designed by either Nash or Burton. However, a few buildings were designed by Charles Robert Cockerell, Sir John Soane, or others. By 1819, the Crown was receiving regular rent and the street was becoming established. At first, it was named New Street and became a dividing line between Soho, which had declined socially and economically, and the fashionable squares and streets of Mayfair to the west. Carlton House was demolished after completion of the works in 1829 and was replaced by Carlton House Terrace, which was designed by Nash and by Burton's son Decimus Burton. Regent Street was the first shopping area in Britain to support late night opening in 1850, when shopkeepers agreed to keep stores open until 7pm.

=== Rebuilding: 1895–1927 ===
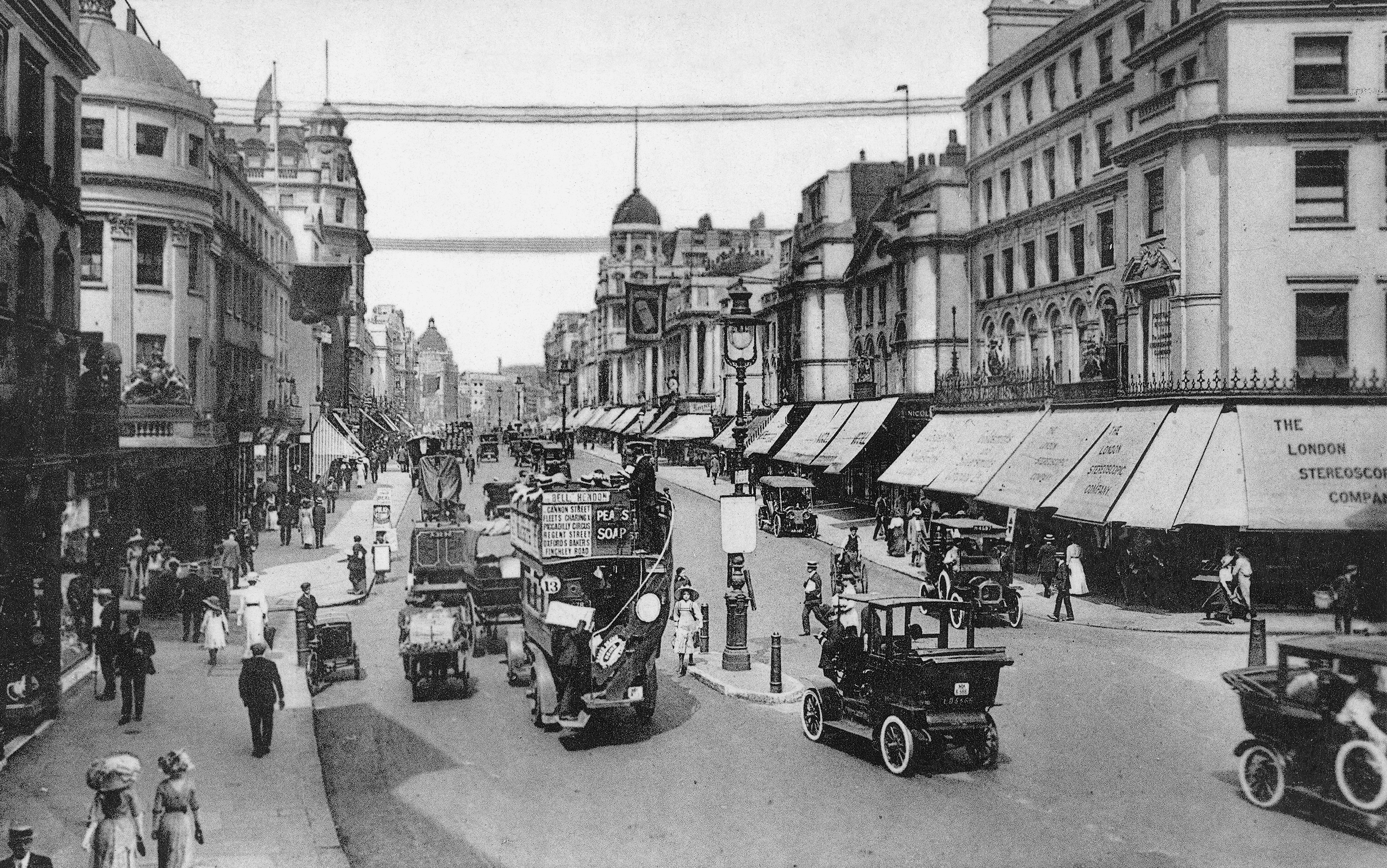
View northwards from junction with Vigo Street and Glasshouse Street, c. 1910 (from an old postcard)

During the 19th century, Regent Street became established as the "centre of fashion". Shops expanded into multiple properties, selling imported and exotic products to appeal to niche consumers. By the end of the century, fashions had changed and the original buildings were small and old fashioned, restricting trade. The colonnade constructed by Nash was demolished in the mid-19th century for fear it might attract "doubtful characters". Other buildings were not up to modern building standards; some had been extended and were structurally suspect. As the 99-year leases came to an end, Regent Street was redeveloped between 1895 and 1927 under the control of the Office of Woods, Forests and Land Revenues (now known as the Crown Estate).

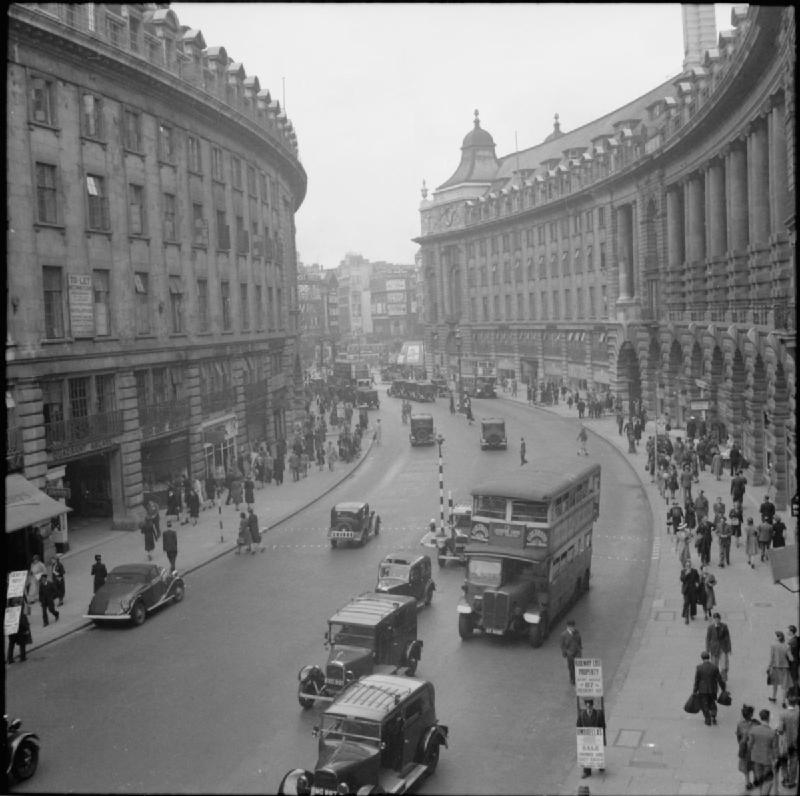
Photograph of Regent Street in 1942, facing Piccadilly Circus

The modern Regent Street is the result of this redevelopment. No original structures survive except south of Oxford Circus for some Nash-designed sewers. The current design is an example of the Beaux Arts approach to urban design: an assembly of separate buildings on a grand scale, designed to harmonise and produce an impressive overall effect. Strict rules governed the reconstruction. Each block had to be designed with a continuous unifying street façade and finished in Portland stone. The first redevelopment was Regent House, just south of Oxford Circus. The stylistic tone for the rebuilding was set by Sir Reginald Blomfield's Quadrant.

The architect Norman Shaw, then aged 73, was brought in to draw up proposals for the Circus and the Quadrant after early plans were considered unsatisfactory. His scheme was approved in principle but subject to indecision and dispute, both on property acquisition and retailers' demand for bigger display windows. Shaw's design for the Piccadilly Hotel was completed in 1908 with modifications, while the Quadrant was rebuilt by Blomfield, adapting Shaw's designs. The work started in 1923 and was completed by 1928. Significantly, no accommodation was built above any of the retail properties, contributing to the demise of the West End as a place of residence. A limited number of architects were responsible for the redesigned street, including Sir John James Burnet, Arthur Joseph Davis and Henry Tanner.

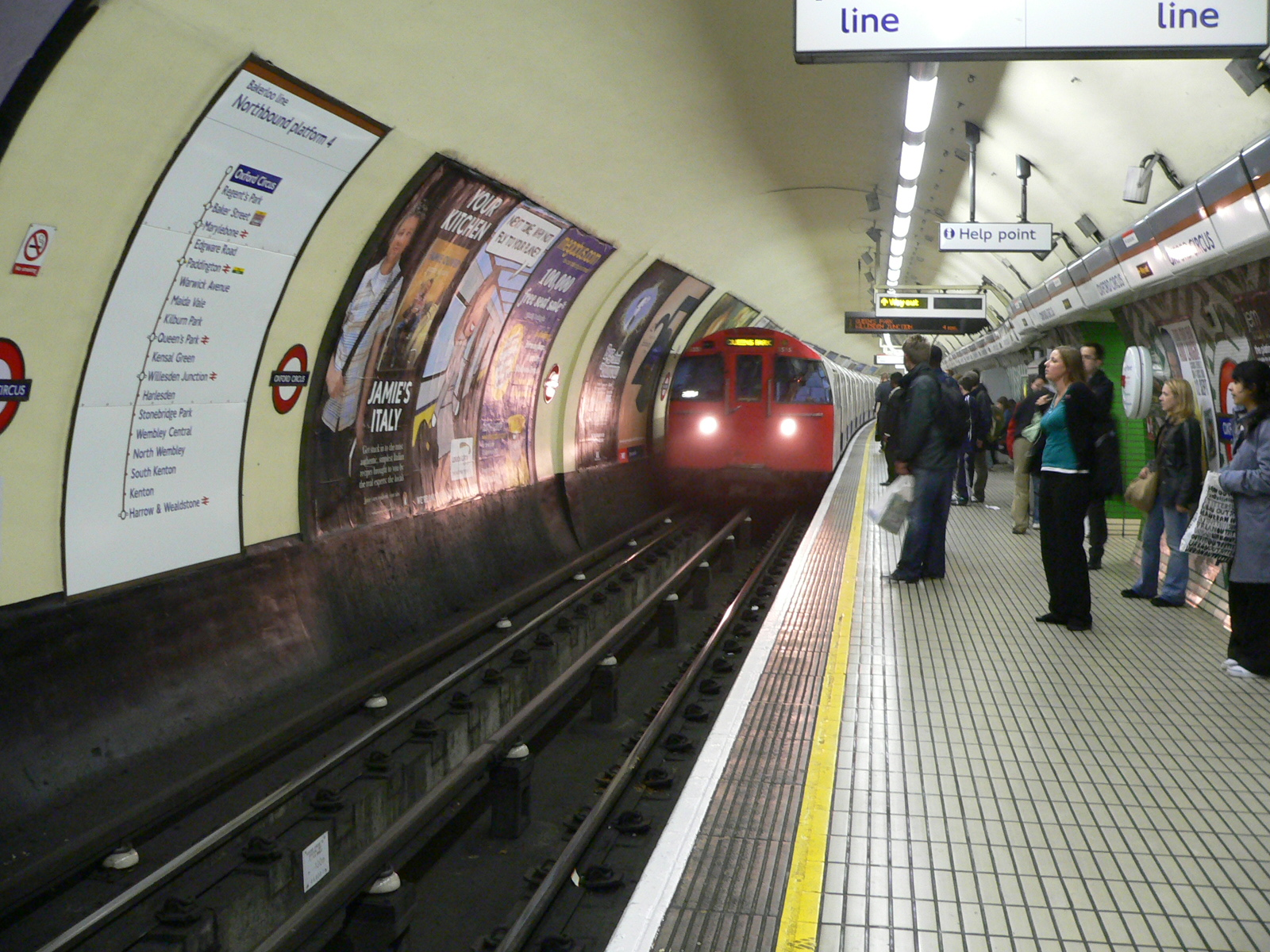
The Bakerloo line, opened in 1906, follows Regent Street for part of its underground course via Baker Street and Waterloo.

The Work was delayed by World War I and not finished until 1927. Its completion was marked by King George V and Queen Mary driving in state along its length. The only remaining Nash building is All Souls Church and all the buildings on the street are at least Grade II listed. All the properties are in the Regent Street Conservation Area.

Meanwhile, the Bakerloo line of the London Underground was built running under the street for part of its course from 1902 until 1906, when it was opened on 10 March that year. The line's entrance at Oxford Circus tube station, near Argyll Street, was designed by Leslie W. Green using glazed terracotta as a facing material.

=== Crown Estate redevelopment ===
By the 1970s, Regent Street had started to decline because of under-investment and competition from neighbouring areas such as Oxford Street or shopping centres away from Central London. In 2002, the Crown Estate, which owns most of Regent Street on behalf of the monarch, started a major redevelopment programme. In 2013 the Estate sold a quarter of the 270,000-square-foot (25,000 m^{2}) Regent Street Quadrant 3 building to the Norwegian Oil Fund, while later that year, Hackett London bought the lease for the Ferrari store on Regent Street for £4m. Smaller shops have been replaced by larger units; the street is now the flagship location of several major brands, including Apple and Banana Republic.

The largest part of the plan was the reconstruction of the Quadrant close to Piccadilly Circus, which was completed in 2011. It offers 200,000 square feet (19,000 m^{2}) of office space spanning over seven floors. Two Art Deco-designed restaurants have also been restored, and the development includes a small number of apartments. The Crown Estate moved its own headquarters from Carlton House Terrace to Regent Street in 2006.

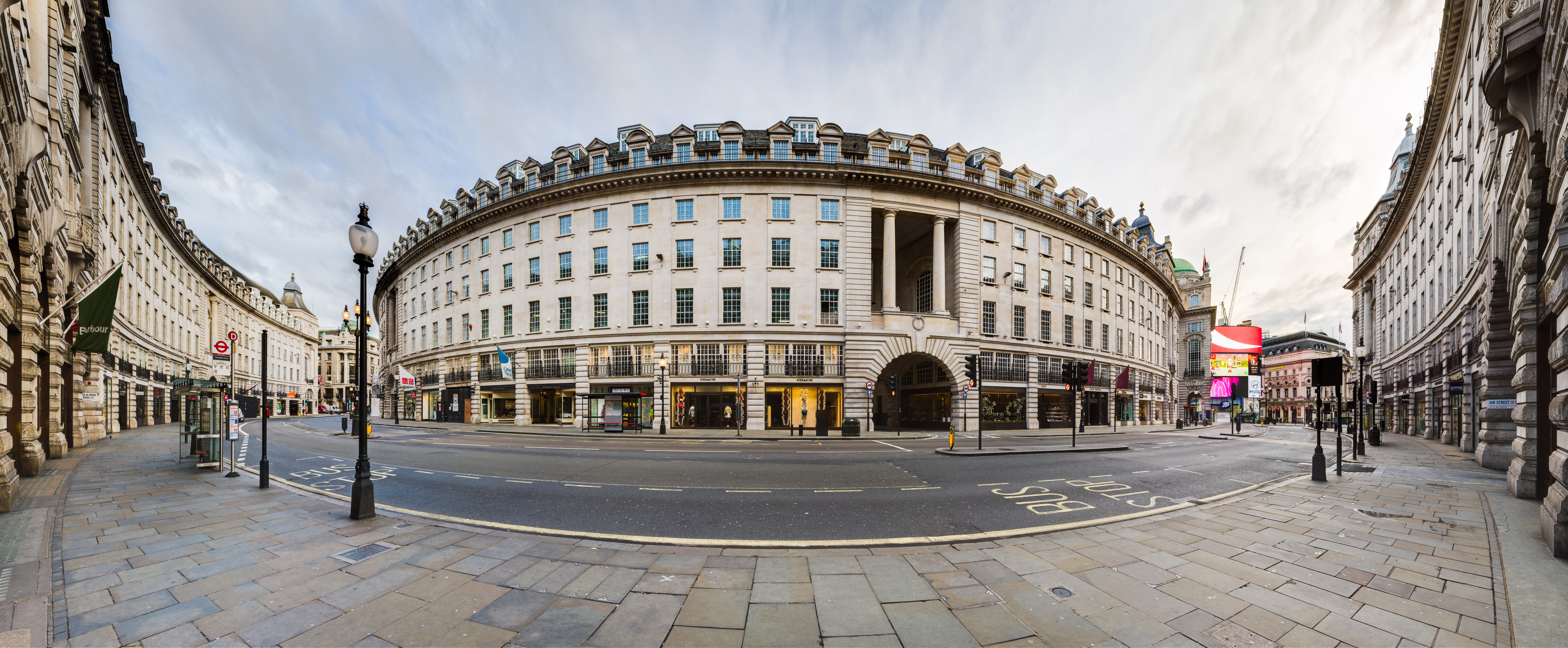
The Quadrant on Regent Street, leading to Piccadilly Circus (Note: This photograph has a wide field of view. In reality, the curvature is not as extreme.)

== Properties ==
=== Retail ===
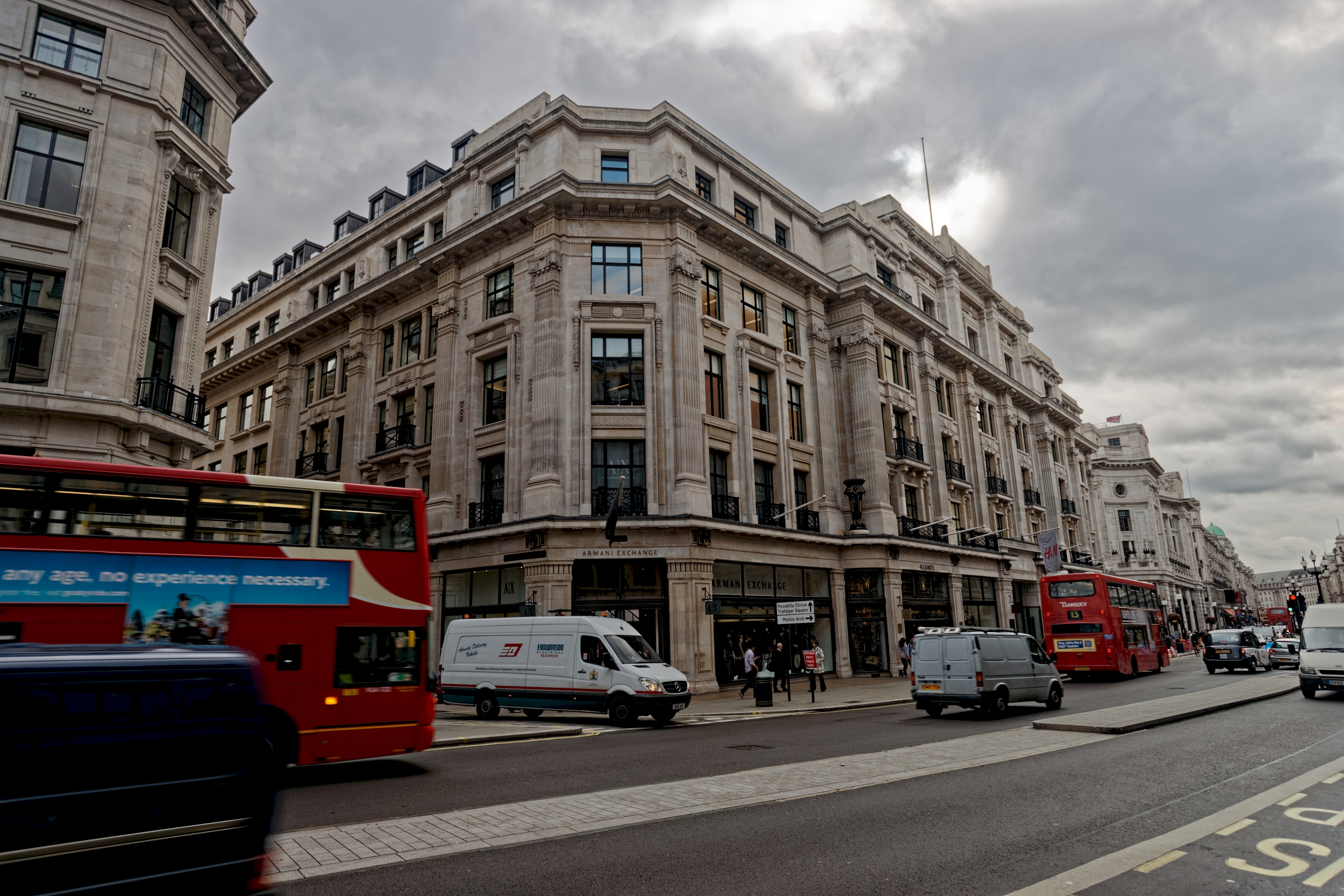
Dickins and Jones formerly occupied the block between Little Argyll Street and Great Marlborough Street.

The department store Dickins and Jones was established at No. 54 Oxford Street as Dickins and Smith before moving to Nos. 232–234 Regent Street in 1835. It was renamed to Dickins and Jones in the 1890s after John Pritchard Jones became a business partner, and by the turn of the 20th century employed over 200 people. It became part of the Harrods group in 1914, and expanded to cover Nos. 224–244 in 1922, in a new building designed by Sir Henry Tanner. In 1959, House of Fraser took over the store by buying the Harrods group. In 2005, House of Fraser announced that the store would close the following year, after it had been making a loss for several years and not kept up with more fashion-conscious department stores elsewhere. The building has been redeveloped with small shop units on the lower floors and flats and offices above.

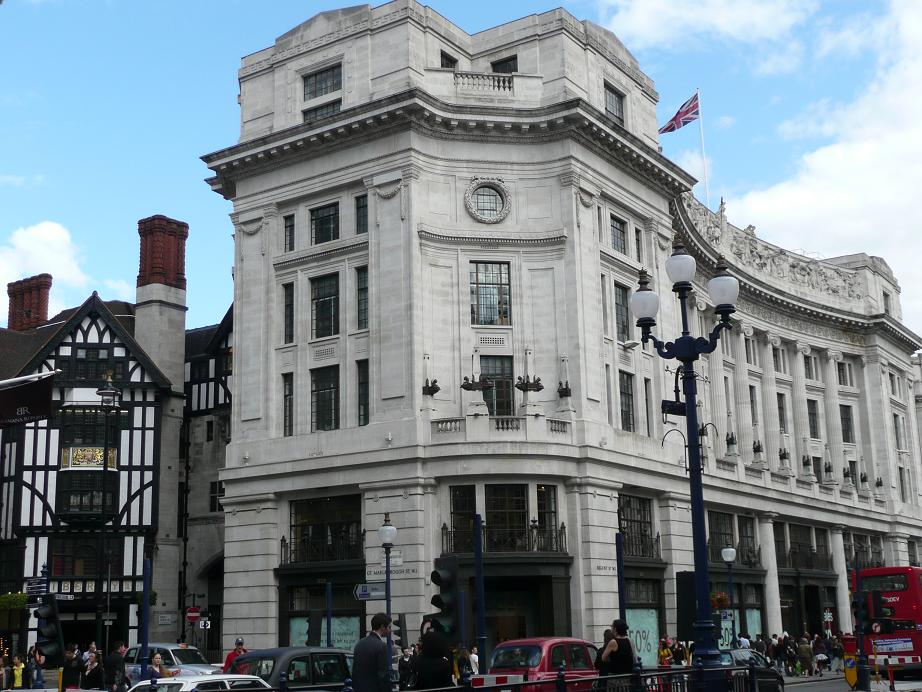
Liberty is at the junction of Regent Street with Great Marlborough Street.

The Liberty department store is based at Nos. 210–220. It was founded by entrepreneur Arthur Lasenby Liberty, who had been inspired by the 1862 International Exhibition and wanted to open an oriental warehouse. He opened his first shop, East India House in 1875 at No. 218a, selling silk garments and various oriental goods. The shop expanded into other properties on Regent Street in the 1880s, separated by a jeweller's shop which was bridged by a double staircase called the "Camel's Back". Liberty later took over all of Nos. 140–150 Regent Street. In 1925, this complex was replaced by two new buildings, and a mock tudor building (built by architects Edwin T. Hall and his son Edwin S. Hall, constructed from the timbers of two ships, HMS Impregnable, and HMS Hindustan on neighbouring Great Marlborough Street connected by a footbridge over Kingly Street, which separates the properties.

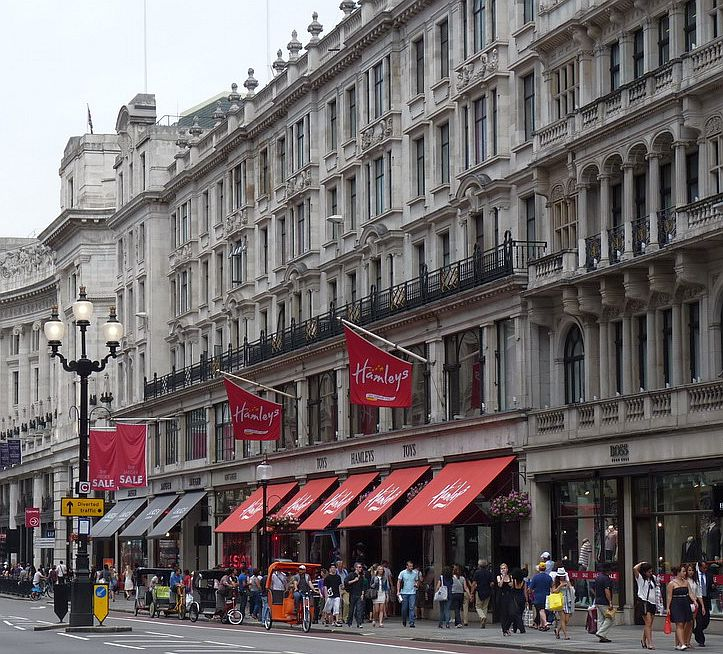
Hamleys Store in Regent Street (centre), next door to Jaeger (left)

The toy store Hamleys is at No. 188 Regent Street, just south of Oxford Circus. It was founded as Noah's Ark at No. 231 High Holborn in 1760. An additional branch opened at Nos. 64–66 Regent Street in 1881, while the original High Holborn building burned down in 1901, moving to Nos. 86–87. The store was frequently the first to market the latest games and toys, and became a strong seller of table tennis equipment in the late 19th century, allowing the sport to become popular. The business moved to Nos. 200–202, and moved to the current address in 1981. It claims to be the largest toy shop in the world.

The main London branch of the clothing store Jaeger was at Nos. 200–206 Regent Street. It was founded in 1884 by Lewis Tomalin, who was inspired by naturalist Gustav Jäger's pioneering use of anti-animal fibre-based clothing. The first shop, on Fore Street, had "Doctor Jaeger's Sanitary Woollen System" inscribed above the door. Oscar Wilde was a regular visitor to the shop. Henry Morton Stanley is known to have worn Jaeger clothing during his search for David Livingstone in Africa, as is Robert Falcon Scott on his fated trip to the South Pole. The company moved to Regent Street in 1935; it moved out in January 2016.

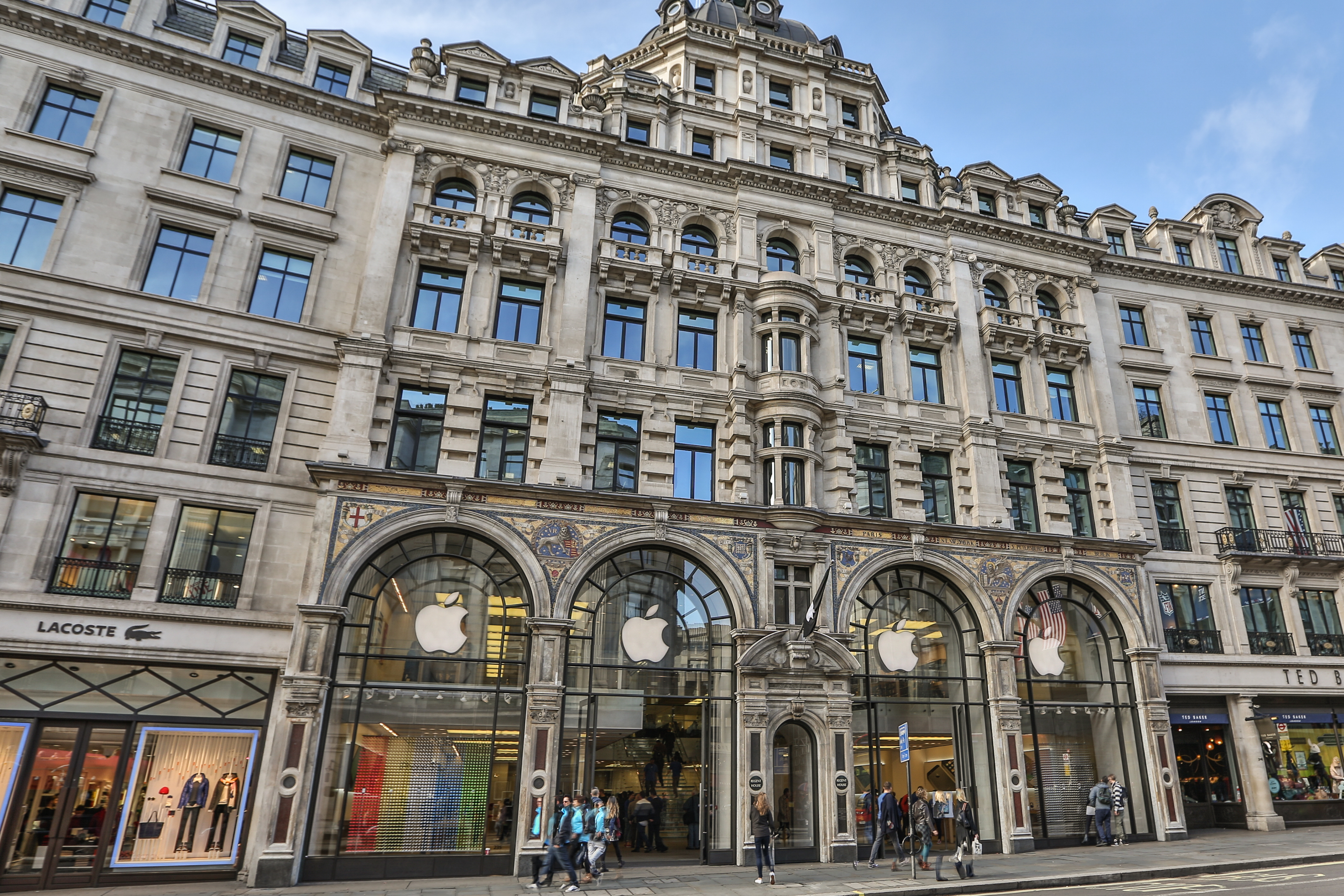
The Apple Store on Regent Street

The Apple Store opened on Regent Street on 20 November 2004. At the time, this was the first such store in Europe, with the others being in the United States and Japan. It was the largest Apple store worldwide until the opening of an even larger store in Covent Garden in August 2010. The building that houses the store is a grade II listed building built in 1898 for Venetian mosaicist Antonio Salviati.

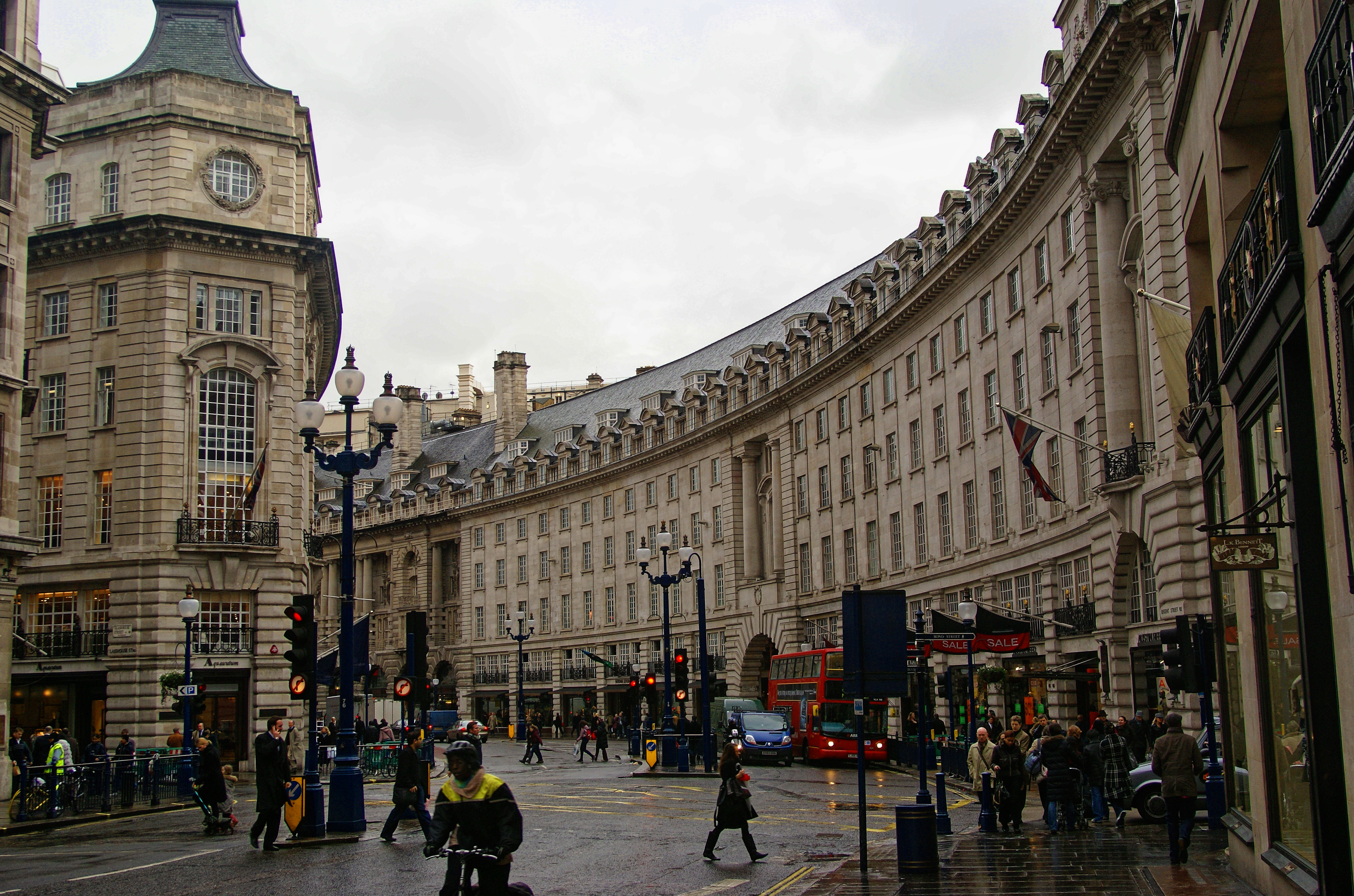
The Quadrant viewed from the north in 2009: Austin Reed occupies the building on the right, with Aquascutum facing it to the left.

Austin Reed's flagship store was at Nos. 103–113 Regent Street for more than 85 years, having moved there in 1911. It had an atrium at its centre, housing glass lifts allowing viewing across all floors. The lower ground floor sold womenswear and also housed Austin's, the refurbished Art Deco Barber Shop. In May 2011, the British fashion retailer Superdry announced it would move into the building, paying £12m for the lease. In return, Austin Reed moved to the former Aquascutum shop on the other side of the road. In 2016, Austin Reed filed for administration, ending over 100 years' presence on Regent Street.

Aquascutum, first established in Mayfair in 1851, opened its flagship store at 100 Regent Street in 1895. It closed on 7 August 2011. Swan and Edgar moved their haberdashery business into the newly-developed Regent Street in the 1820s; they first opened at number 49, and by 1848 had expanded into 45-51. The premises, which included a prominent frontage on Piccadilly Circus, were rebuilt by Sir Reginald Blomfield in 1910-20. The department store closed down in 1982.

Hedges and Butler, wine and spirits merchant established in 1667, moved into 153 Regent Street in 1819 and stayed there for a little under 200 years. Since 2014 the premises have been occupied by Watches of Switzerland.

=== Broadcasting ===
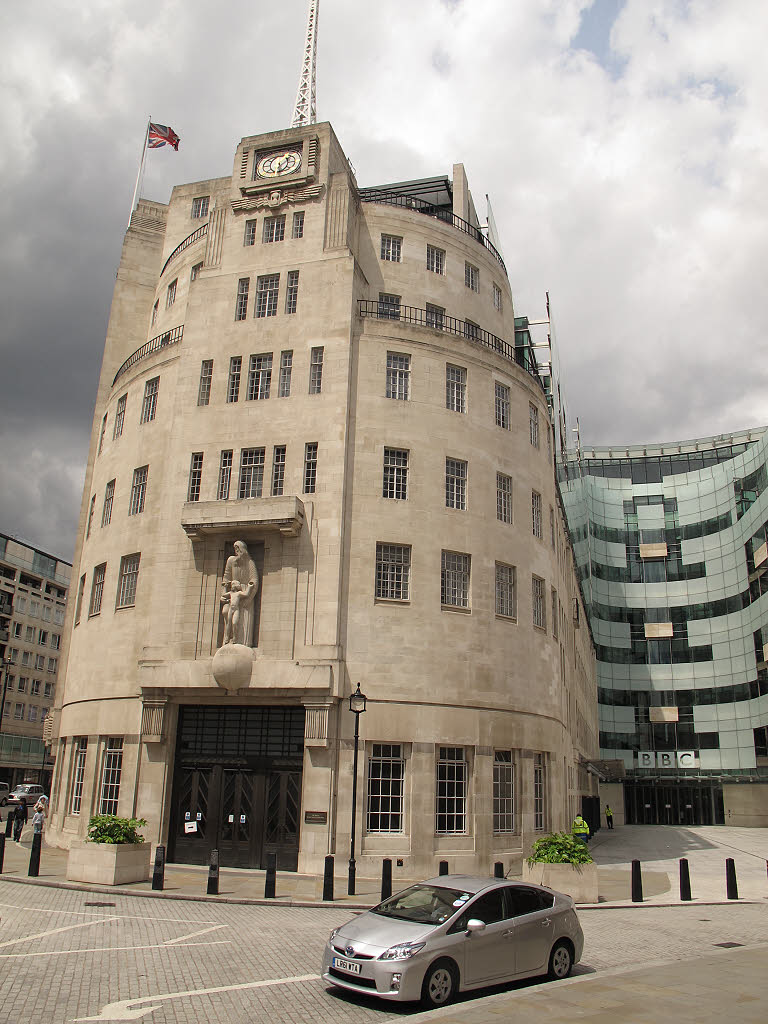
Broadcasting House is immediately north of the top end of Regent Street, and has been used by the BBC since 1932.

Immediately north of Regent Street is the BBC's headquarters, Broadcasting House, whose front entrance is in Langham Place. Several national radio stations are broadcast from this building. The site had formerly been a building on the gardens of Foley House designed by James Wyatt and called Wyatt's House. It was demolished in 1928 (with much of the fixtures ending up in the Victoria and Albert Museum) to construct Broadcasting House. Construction was challenging because the building had to be visually similar to other properties on Regent Street, yet also contain over twenty soundproofed studios. The exterior is built of Portland stone and above the front entrance is a sculpture by Eric Gill.

Broadcasting House was first used by the BBC on 2 May 1932, and total construction costs were £350,000. It was too small for all services, and St George's Hall, next to All Souls, was used for variety broadcasts until it was demolished during the Blitz. On 15 October 1940, the building took a direct hit, killing seven people, and later that year a landmine exploded on Portland Place, causing widespread fires in Broadcasting House. Despite the damage, it survived the war and became one of the best known buildings associated with radio broadcasting. Subsequently, the BBC expanded with additional studios at Maida Vale, followed by the former headquarters of BBC Television, BBC Television Centre at Wood Lane. Between 2003 and 2010, Broadcasting House was expanded to include a new wing and modernise the site, replacing earlier extensions. It was designed by MacCormac Jamieson Prichard. Originally named the Egton House, it was renamed to the John Peel Wing in 2012, in memory of the radio broadcaster.

The Paris Theatre was located in a converted cinema in Lower Regent Street, near other BBC buildings. Several rock groups performed live concerts here, including The Beatles, Queen and Pink Floyd, which were simultaneously recorded for broadcast. The BBC stopped using the theatre in 1995.

=== Education ===
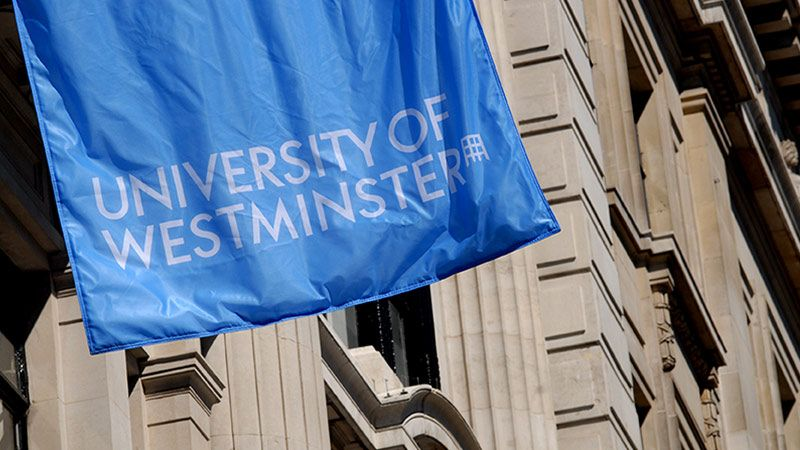
The University of Westminster's official flag in royal blue above No. 309 Regent Street

The University of Westminster's main campus is at No. 309 Regent Street. Founded in 1838 under the chairmanship of George Cayley, it is one of the oldest educational institutions in Central London. It began life as the Royal Polytechnic Institution (after a royal charter had been formally received in August 1839 Prince Albert became a patron to the institution). The Polytechnic closed in 1881, but was promptly re-founded by Quintin Hogg as The Polytechnic at Regent Street. In 1970 it was amalgamated with Holborn College of Law, Languages and Commerce to become the Polytechnic of Central London (PCL), which in turn became the University of Westminster in 1992.

The university houses the Regent Street Cinema which acted as a platform for major scientists, artists and authors such as Charles Dickens, John Henry Pepper, and The Lumière Brothers (Auguste and Louis Lumière) where public and private screenings of Cinématographe were shown to an audience. The cinema was restored and reopened to the public in May 2015.

=== Other ===
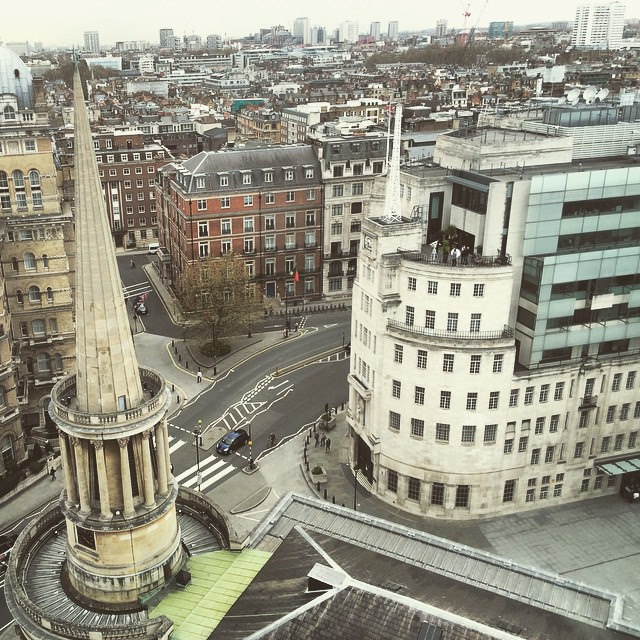
All Souls Church next to Broadcasting House, as seen from The Heights

All Souls Church is at the top of Regent Street next to Broadcasting House. It was built in 1823 out of Bath stone and consecrated in 1824, and is the only surviving building in Regent Street that was designed by John Nash.

The Café Royal, located at 68 Regent Street in the Quadrant, was opened in 1865 by Daniel Nicols and became an institution of London high society. In 1895 Oscar Wilde argued with Frank Harris in the café about his proposal to sue the Marquess of Queensberry for libel over Wilde's alleged homosexuality. Wilde went ahead with the trial, which ultimately led to his own arrest and imprisonment. The present building, by Sir Reginald Blomfield, dates from 1928 and is Grade II listed. It was closed in 2008 and the building which houses the café was bought by a subsidiary of Alrov Group, as a part of Crown Estate's plans to redevelop this part of Regent Street.

Veeraswamy, London's oldest extant Indian restaurant, has been at 99-101 Regent Street since 1926.

== Events ==
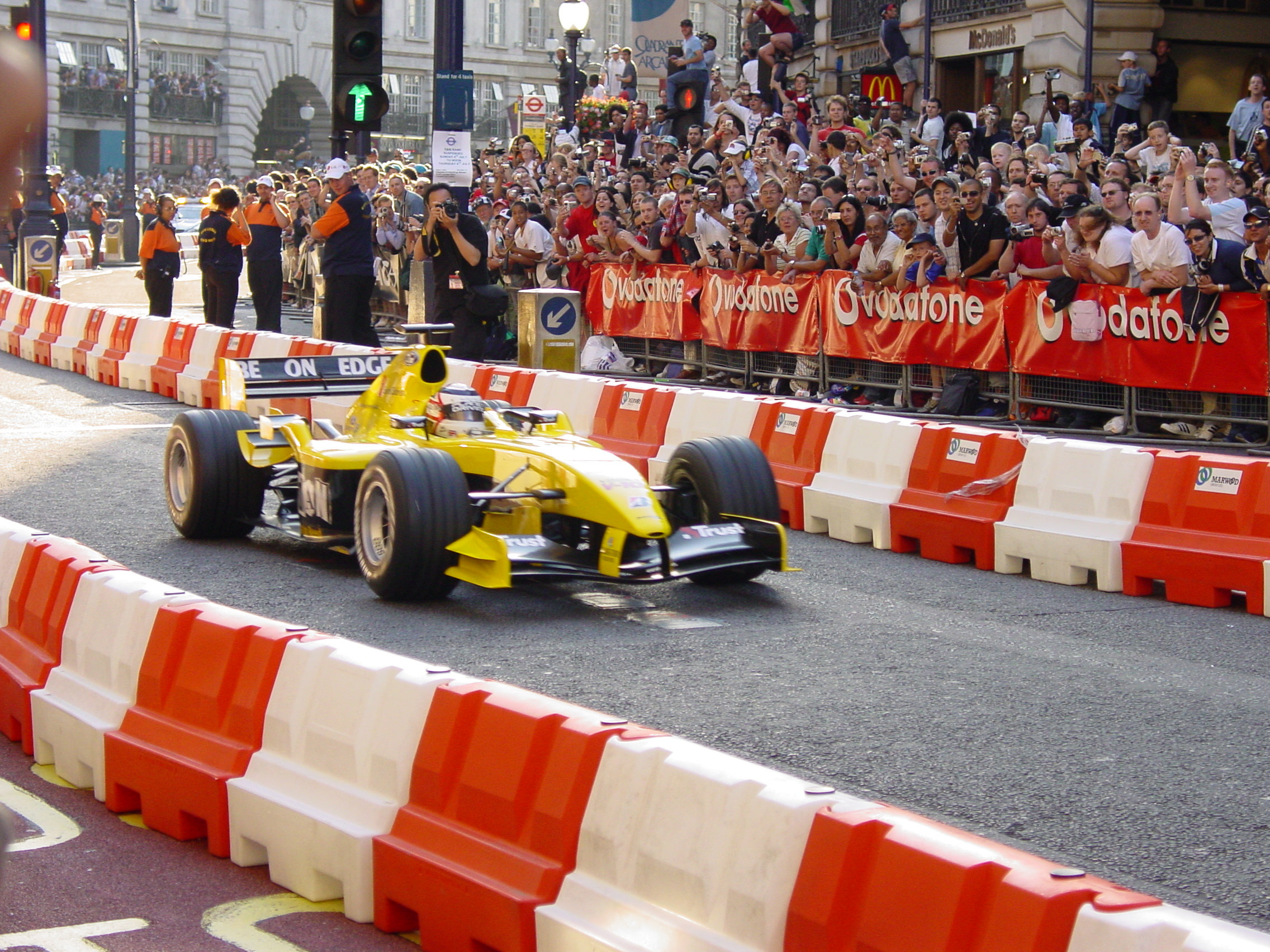
Nigel Mansell driving a Jordan Formula One car on Regent Street in 2004

Regent Street is home to several events throughout the year. The Regent Street Festival happens annually, and during this time, the street is closed to traffic. In September, there is a series of fashion-related events, dubbed as Fashion and Design Month (FDM), which has been running since 2015. In an interview with David Shaw, the head of the Regent Street Portfolio, he said that for FDM 2016, they worked with many "talented individuals across a variety of events, combining creative talent with our established stores."

There have been Christmas lights on Regent Street in various forms since 1882. The current regular displays date from 1948, when the Regent Street Association decorated the street with trees. Since 1954, the Regent Street Association have arranged annual Christmas lights. There is a different display every year and the switching on ceremony occurs during November.

On 6 July 2004, half a million people crowded into Regent Street and the surrounding streets to watch a parade of Formula One cars. In 2016, the sport's chief manager, Bernie Ecclestone, speculated that a London Grand Prix may potentially happen in the future, including Regent Street as a part of the circuit.

== Cultural references ==
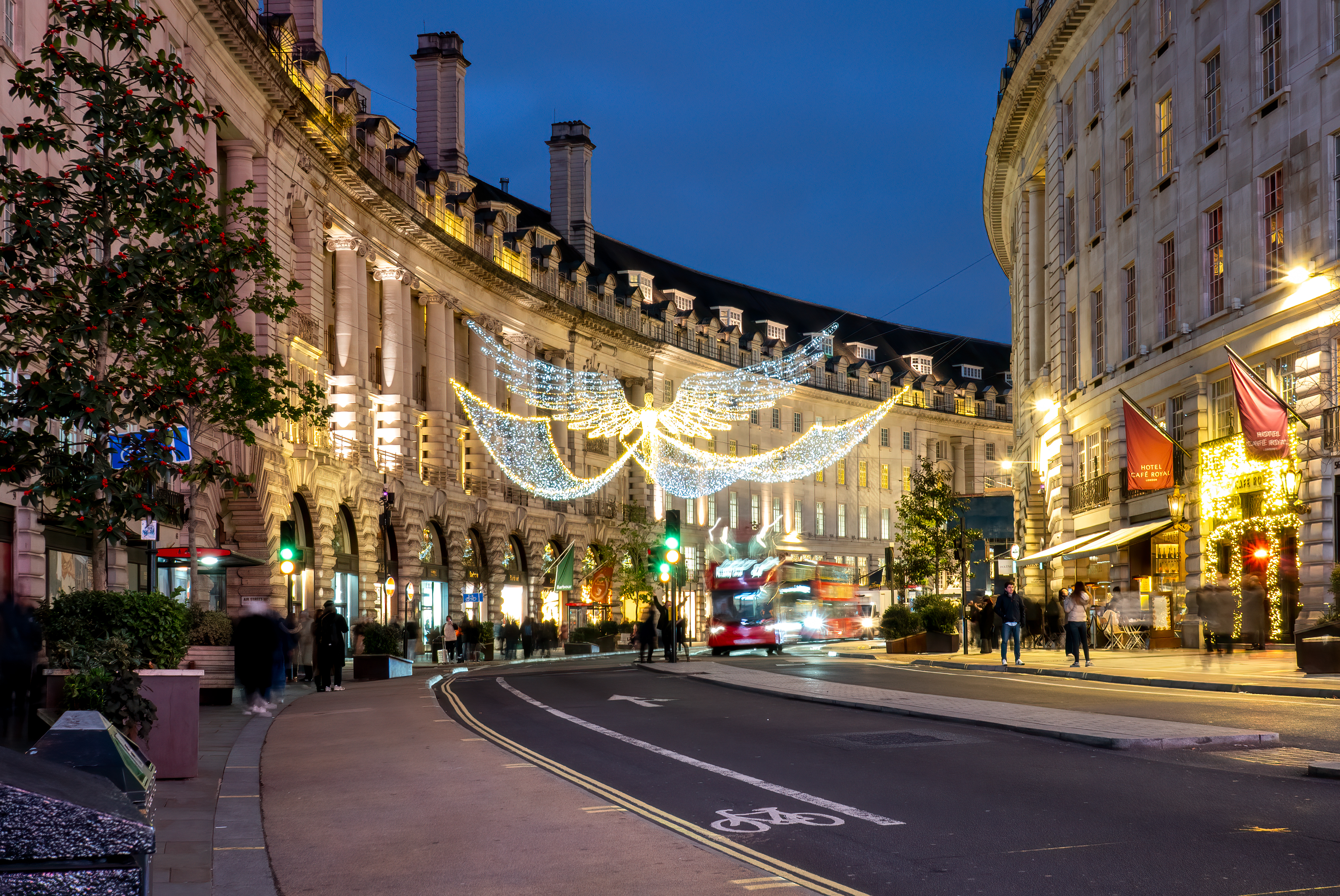
Winter lights on Regent Street at night in 2025

The character Lord Frederick Verisopht in Charles Dickens' Nicholas Nickleby lived in an apartment in Regent Street. This reflected the nature of the street in the mid-19th century when it was still a fashionable residence for the upper class.

In August 1839, the first British commercial production of daguerreotype photographs were carried out in a property on Regent Street, shortly after the process had been publicly documented.

Regent Street is a location on the British version of Monopoly as a group of three green squares with Oxford Street and Bond Street. The three properties are grouped together as they are all known for their retail and commercial backgrounds.

The Langham Hotel on Regent Street is mentioned in several of Arthur Conan Doyle's Sherlock Holmes stories, including "The Sign of Four", "A Scandal in Bohemia" and "The Disappearance of Lady Frances Carfax". In The Hound of the Baskervilles (chapter 4), Holmes and Watson attempt to follow Stapleton down Regent Street.

Offshoot crescent road Heddon Street was the location for the cover photography for 1972 David Bowie album The Rise and Fall of Ziggy Stardust and the Spiders from Mars. A blue plaque has been placed to mark the spot where Bowie posed for the front cover.

== See also ==
- List of eponymous roads in London
- New Regent Street in Christchurch, New Zealand

== Bibliography ==
- Green, Oliver (1987). The London Underground: An Illustrated History. Ian Allan. ISBN 0-7110-1720-4.
- Hibbert, Christopher; Weinreb, Ben; Keay, John; Keay, Julia (2010). "Regent Street". The London Encyclopaedia (3rd ed.). Pan Macmillan. ISBN 978-1-405-04924-5.
- Hobhouse, Hermione (2008). A History of Regent Street: A Mile of Style. Phillimore. ISBN 978-1-860-77248-1.
- Moore, Tim (2003). Do Not Pass Go. Vintage. ISBN 978-0-099-43386-6.
- Oulton, Jenny; Paterson, David (2000). "Opening-Time In The West End". London Dawn to Dusk: Celebration of a City. New Holland Publishers. ISBN 1-85974-517-2.
- Stern, Robert A.M.; Fishman, David; Tilove, Jacob (2013). Paradise Planned: The Garden Suburb and the Modern City. The Monacelli Press. ISBN 978-1580933261.
- Summerson, John (1962). Georgian London (Revised ed.). Harmondsworth: Penguin Books.
- Timbs, John (1867). "Regent Street". Curiosities of London (2nd ed.). London: J.C. Hotten. OCLC 12878129.
- Weightman, Gavin; Humphries, Steve; Mack, Joanna; Taylor, John (2007). The Making of Modern London. Random House. ISBN 978-0-091-92004-3.
- Williams, Guy (1990). Augustus Pugin Versus Decimus Burton: A Victorian Architectural Duel. London: Cassell Publishers Ltd. ISBN 0-304-31561-3.
- City of Westminster Conservation Area Directory No.12 (PDF) (Report). Westminster City Council. Archived from the original (PDF) on 11 September 2016.
