= Wong Kei =

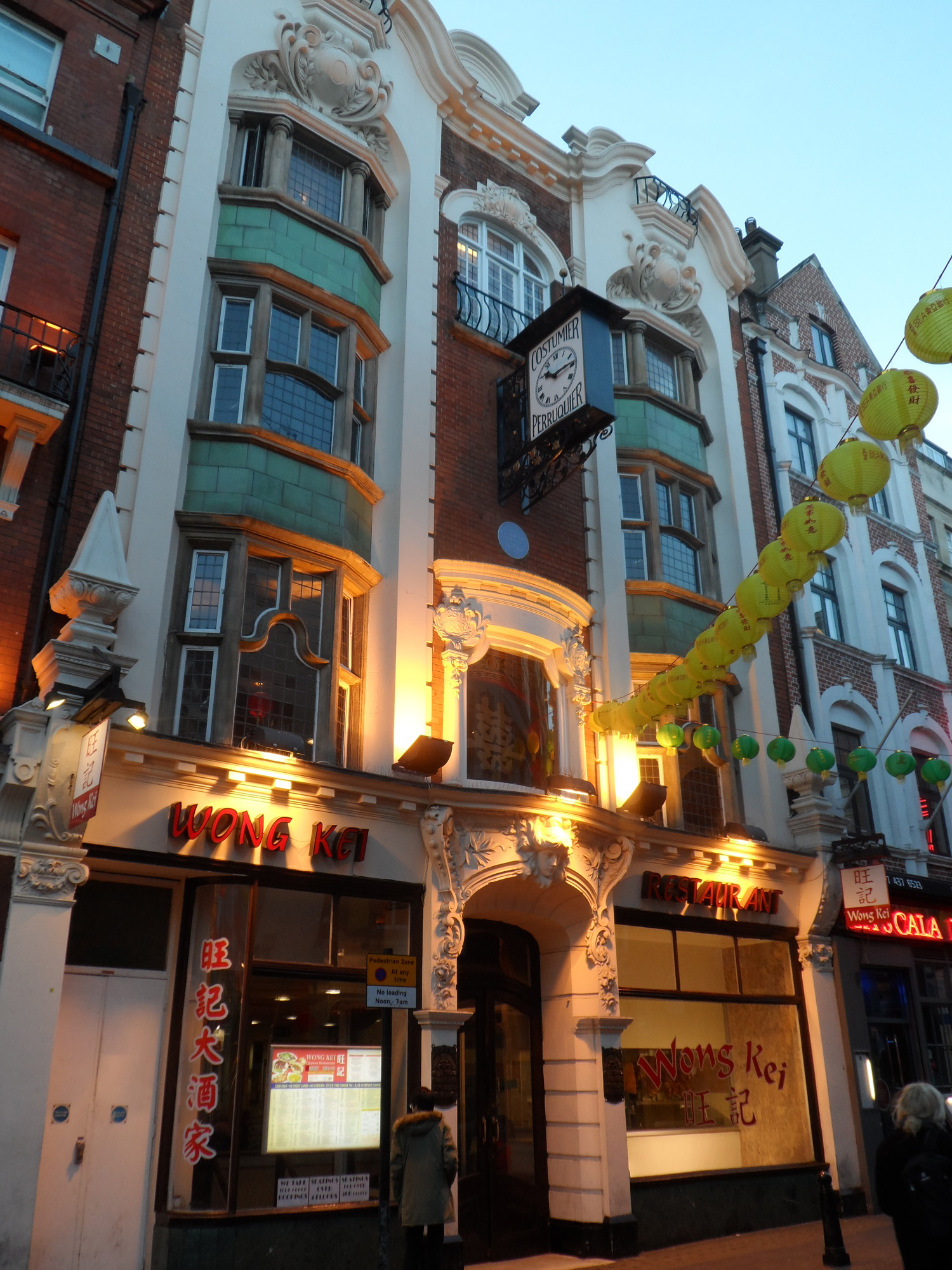
- Wong Kei in 2015
- Interactive map of Wong Kei

Restaurant information
- Food type: Cantonese cuisine
- Location: 41-43 Wardour Street, London, W1D 6PY, United Kingdom
- Coordinates: 51.511389°N 0.1325°W
- Seating capacity: 500
- Website: wongkeilondon.com

Wong Kei (Chinese: 旺記; pinyin: wàng jì; Jyutping: wong6 gei4) is a Chinese restaurant in London's Chinatown, once described as "the rudest restaurant in London". It is one of the largest Chinese restaurants in the UK with seating for around 500 diners.

== Restaurant ==
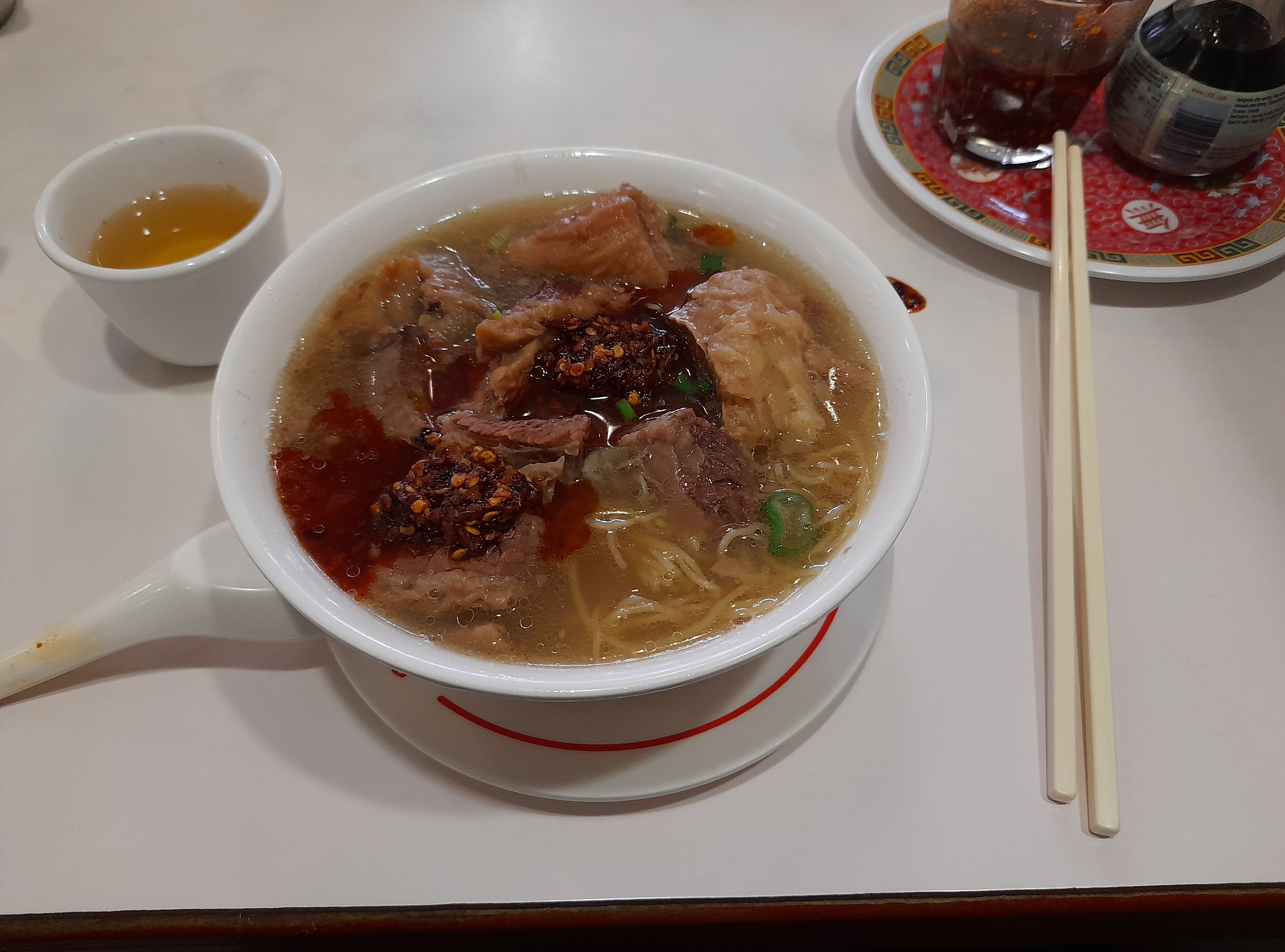
a bowl of Wong Kei beef brisket noodle soup with tea.

Wong Kei was once known for the rudeness of its staff, who would shout "Sit down with them!" or "Go upstairs!" to arriving patrons, insult customers who asked for a knife and fork, and chase those who failed to leave a sufficient tip. This aspect was seen as a positive and enjoyable feature rather than a criticism of the restaurant. After a renovation, the restaurant reopened in 2001 with friendlier waiters, and when it reopened under new management in March 2014, new owner Daniel Luc said: "Maybe there was an issue with rude staff 20 to 30 years ago, but I don't think so any more. I don't know whether that's a good thing or not."

== Building ==
Wong Kei originally occupied two shops on nearby Rupert Court but is currently situated at 41–43 Wardour Street. This building was originally built by Willy Clarkson (1861–1934), at the time a well-known theatrical wig-maker and costumier. It was designed by the architect H. M. Wakeley in a mixed Baroque and Art Nouveau style. Sarah Bernhardt laid the foundation stone in 1904 and Sir Henry Irving laid the coping stone in 1905.

Clarkson's business operated there from 1905 until it ceased trading in 1940. The building retains an original clock over the entrance, advertising it as the premises of a Costumer and Perruquier (one who makes and sells wigs). In 1966, a blue plaque was fixed to the façade to commemorate Clarkson.

When Terence Dalley sketched the building in 1972, another Chinese restaurant, Lee Ho Fook, occupied the ground floor.

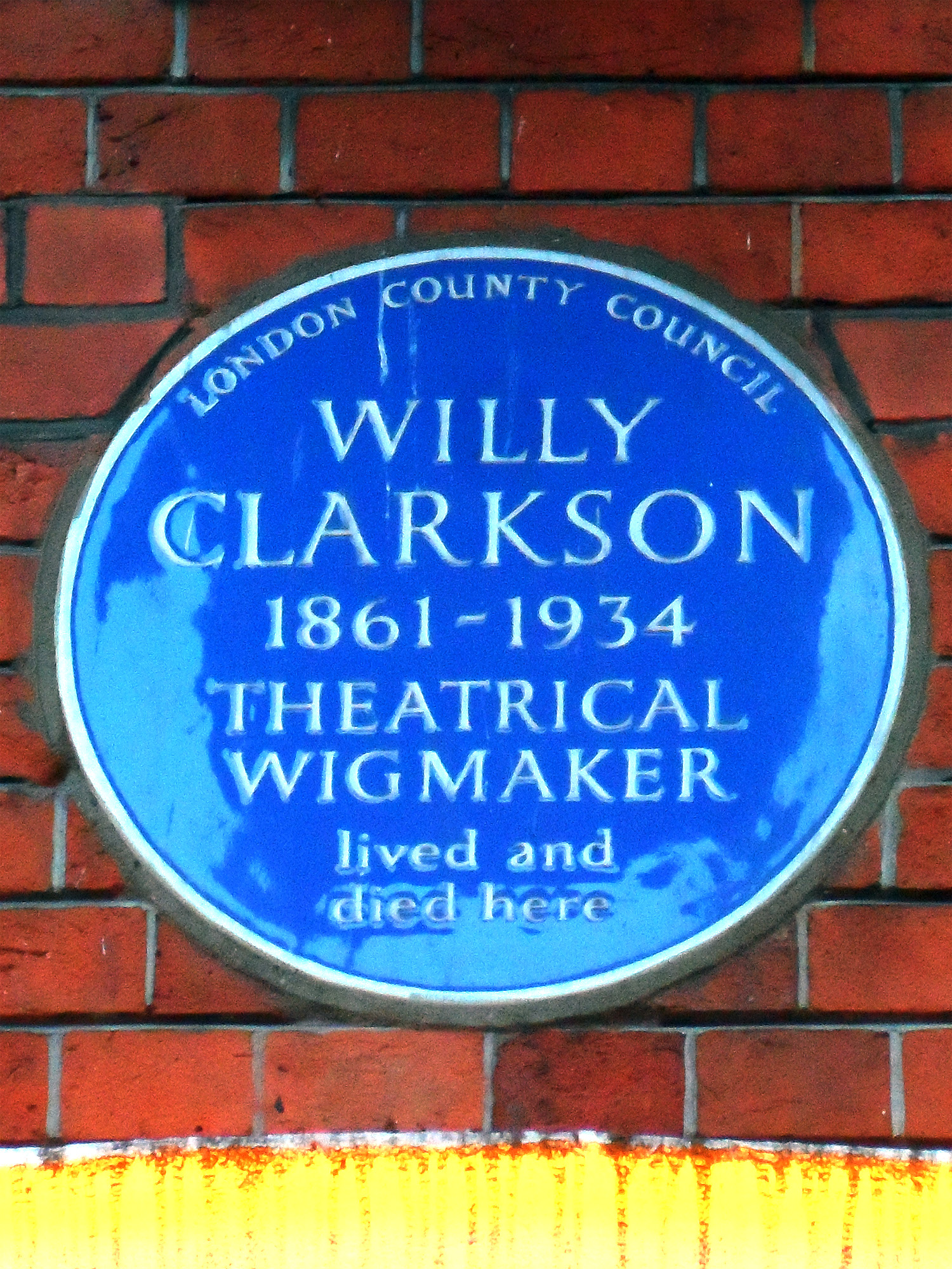
Blue plaque to Willy Clarkson

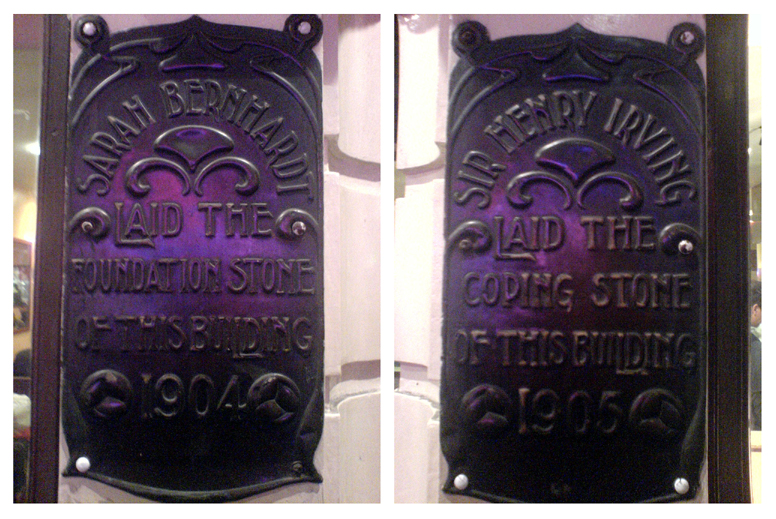
Plaques on either side of the entrance

== See also ==
- List of Chinese restaurants
