= Willy Clarkson =

British costume designer and wigmaker

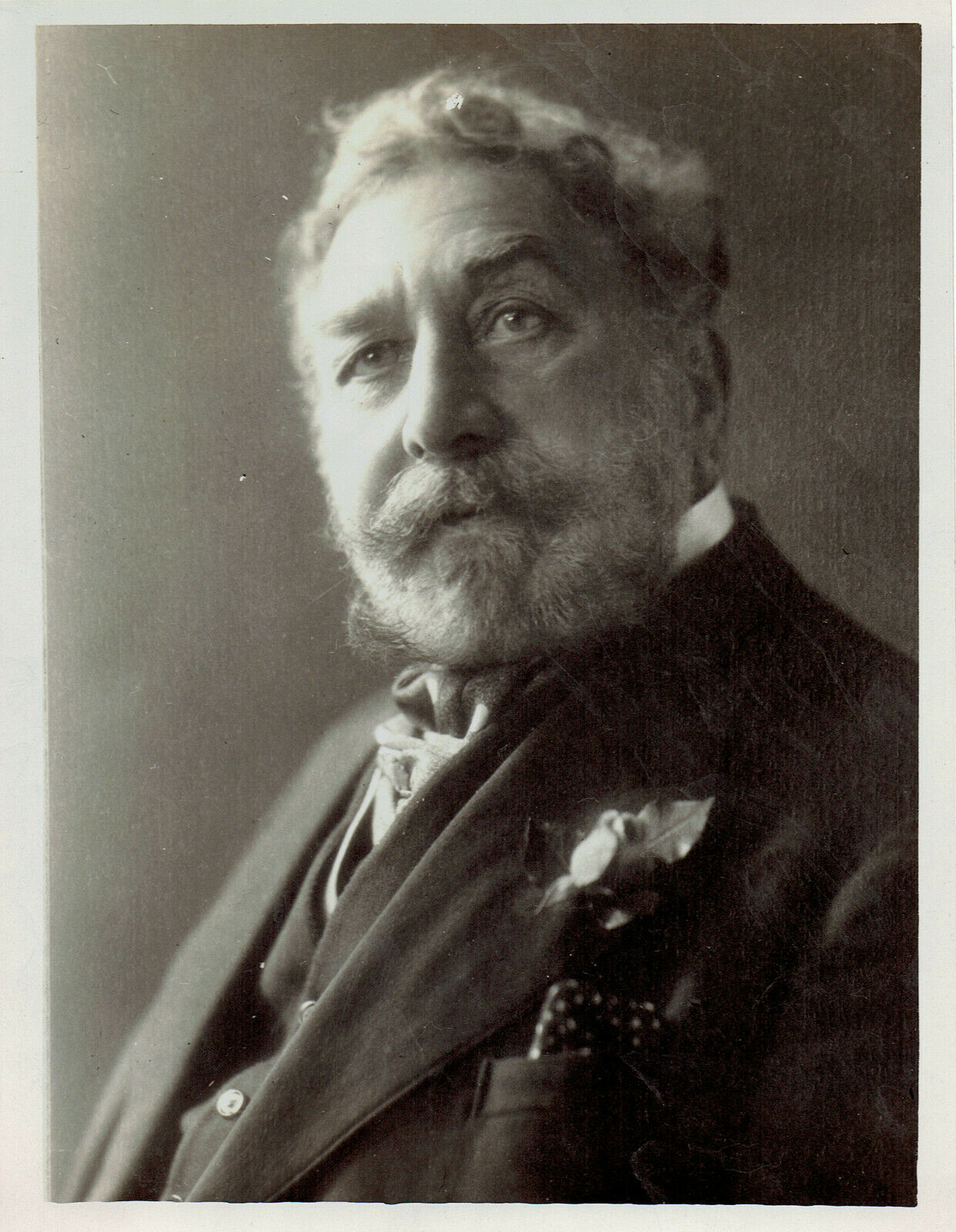
- Willy Clarkson in 1934
- Born: 31 March 1861
- Died: 13 October 1934 (aged 73)
- Resting place: Brookwood Cemetery
- Occupation: Theatrical costume designer/wig maker

William Berry Clarkson (31 March 1861 – 12/13 October 1934) was a prominent British theatrical costume designer and wigmaker.

== Career ==
Clarkson's father had been making wigs since 1833. Willie Clarkson was educated in Paris but left school at the age of twelve to assist in his father's business. He took over the business on the death of his father in 1878 and expanded into providing theatrical costumes and make-up. His company became very successful, supplying most of the London West End theatres for five decades. He also sold wigs to the public for non-theatrical wear.

A 1900 article in the theatrical newspaper The Era stated:

Not to know Willy Clarkson and his doings is to be out of the theatrical world, for Willy Clarkson, with the bright and easy (though sometimes anxious) manner is ever hovering 'before and behind.' Scarcely any big production in London is undertaken without the aid of the owner of the Wellington-street wiggeries.

Starting in 1889, Clarkson's company supplied costumes and wigs used in the amateur dramatic productions of Queen Victoria's family and circle. He provided the wigs for the princesses who were attending the fancy-dress Devonshire House Ball of 1897, and visited Buckingham Palace beforehand to arrange their hair.Edward VII appointed him "Royal Perruquier and Costumier."

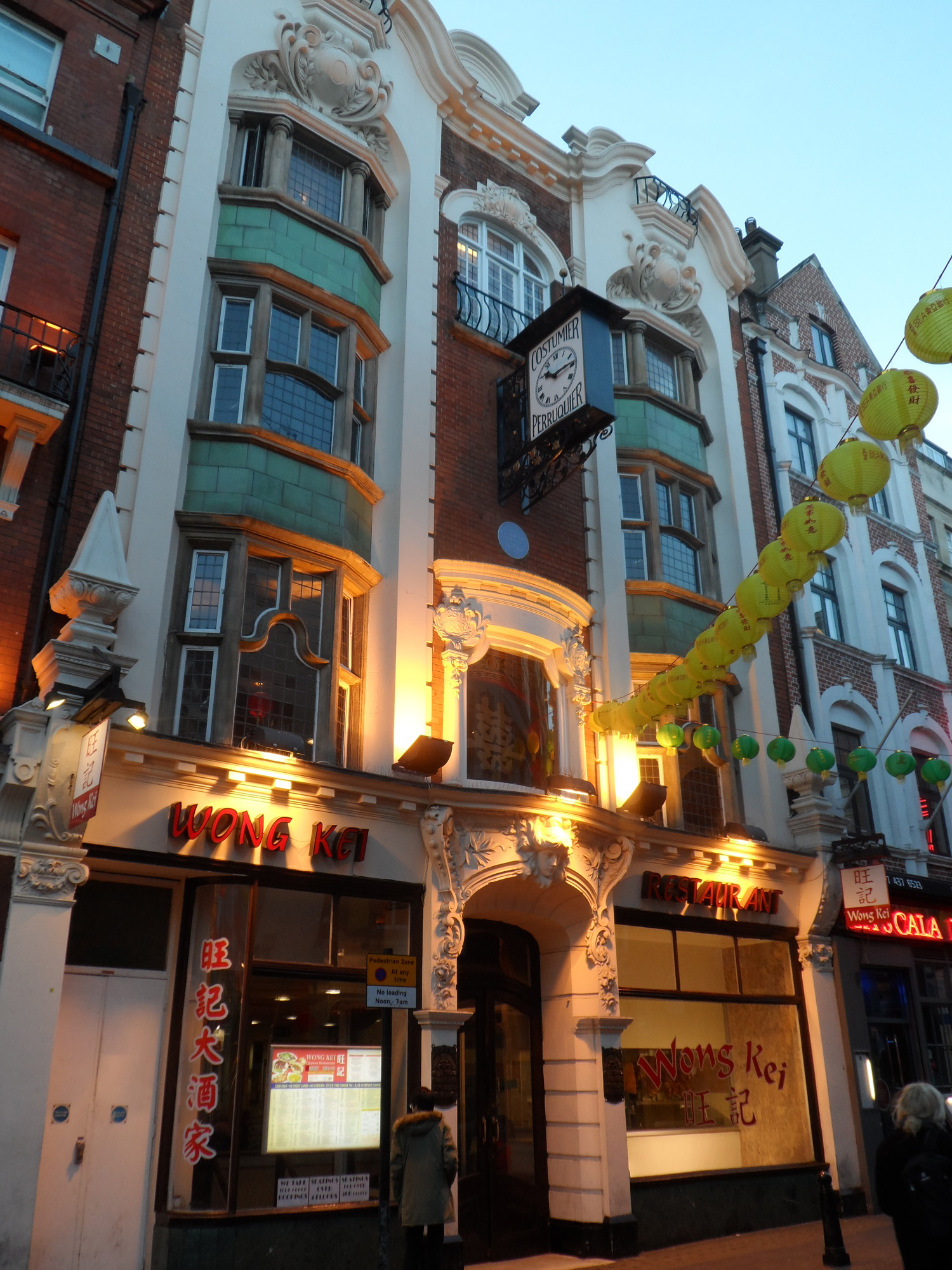
Willy Clarkson's premises on Wardour Street, which he built in 1905. Now the Wong Kei restaurant. Photographed in 2015

In 1905, he had new premises built at 41-43 Wardour Street, Soho. Plaques still present on the building record that the foundation stone was laid by Sarah Bernhardt and the coping stone by Sir Henry Irving. (Note: Doubt has been cast on whether Irving was actually present as he was in poor health in 1905, and died in October of that year) In 1910, Clarkson helped disguise the members of Horace de Vere Cole's Dreadnought hoax (including a young Virginia Woolf) as an Abyssinian royal delegation – this is recorded in Adrian Stephen's 1936 account of the incident.

During World War 1, he supplied realistic papier-mâché heads to Hesketh Hesketh-Prichard – a pioneer of sniping in the British Army. The heads were used in the trenches on the Western Front. A dummy head mounted on a stick would be raised over the lip of a British trench. If a German sniper shot it, the bullet holes would reveal the direction the bullet came from and the location of the German.

In the 1920s, Clarkson was the owner of the Duchess Theatre in Catherin Street. At its peak, his company had over 100 employees and had 50,000 costumes in stock. Clarkson was a well-known figure in theatrical circles. He attended every West End production's first night and knew many of the leading figures, such as Marie Lloyd, Herbert Beerbohm Tree, Dame Nellie Melba and Lillie Langtry. Signed photographs of famous clients covered the walls of his shops.

In 1933, Clarkson appeared in "Faces of Destiny", a series of short films directed by Widgey R. Newman that featured prominent people. Others featured included Arthur Winnington-Ingram, Bishop of London, the surgeon John Bland-Sutton and Member of Parliament Jennie Lee

During his life there were widespread rumours of Clarkson's homosexuality, at that time a crime under the Criminal Law Amendment Act 1885. The public lavatory in Dansey Place, an alley opposite his Wardour Street shop, was known locally as Clarkson's Cottage.

== Criminal associations ==
Clarkson claimed to have had among his clients the murderer Hawley Harvey Crippen and his wife and victim Corrine "Cora" Turner, as well as the murderer Ronald True. Clarkson also made disguises for detectives from Scotland Yard and helped police catch the murderer Herbert John Bennett, who had ordered wigs from him.

A long-standing acquaintance of Clarkson was William Cooper Hobbs; they first met in 1886. Hobbs was initially a solicitor's clerk, but became a notorious, convicted blackmailer. In 1924 Clarkson helped Hobbs attempt to flee Britain when he was facing serious criminal charges. But the attempt failed and Hobbs was arrested at Gravesend while attempting to board a ferry to Rotterdam The police found Hobbs was carrying £1500 in cash (equivalent to £80,000 in 2025). This money was suspected to be criminal proceeds, but Clarkson produced a document that claimed it was his money that he had lent to Hobbs, and it was handed over to him. Hobbs was convicted and sentenced to two years in prison for attempting to blackmail Hari Singh for £150,000 (equivalent to £7,880,000 in 2025).

On 5 September 1931, a fire broke out in the basement of Clarkson's Wardour Street shop but was quickly extinguished by seven fire engines. Clarkson received £26,000 from his insurers (equivalent to £1,530,000 in 2025) In September 1933, there was a fire at another of Clarkson's properties, a warehouse in Ramillies Place, Soho. Clarkson made an insurance claim of £36,748 but his insurers refused to make a payment. Sir William Crocker, a solicitor acting for the insurance companies, began an investigation and gathered enough evidence to prosecute Clarkson for making fraudulent claims, but Clarkson died in October 1934, before the prosecution could take place. (Note: Curiously, William Crocker has been long acquainted with Clarkson, and had gone to him several times for disguises to help in the investigation of other cases)

In March 1937, a consortium of insurance companies and Lloyds underwriters filed two suits against Clarkson's estate. Their purpose was to recover money paid to Clarkson when he was alive for fire insurance claims. One of those giving evidence was a man called Leopald Harris. In 1933 Harris had received a 14-year prison sentence as the ringleader of a large gang of arsonists, who set fires for the purpose of insurance fraud. He testified that he had been paid £775 (equivalent to £50,000 in 2025) to organise the setting of the 1931 fire in Clarkson's shop, and that one of the men involved subsequently started the 1933 warehouse fire. Harris also bribed the attending member of the London Salvage Corps to ignore evidence that valuable goods supposedly destroyed had been removed before the fire started.

The plaintiffs won their case and were awarded £26,174. During the trial, it emerged that six other fires and one gas explosion had been reported by Clarkson at his premises in 1895, 1898, 1901, 1910, 1915, 1918 and 1924

== Death ==
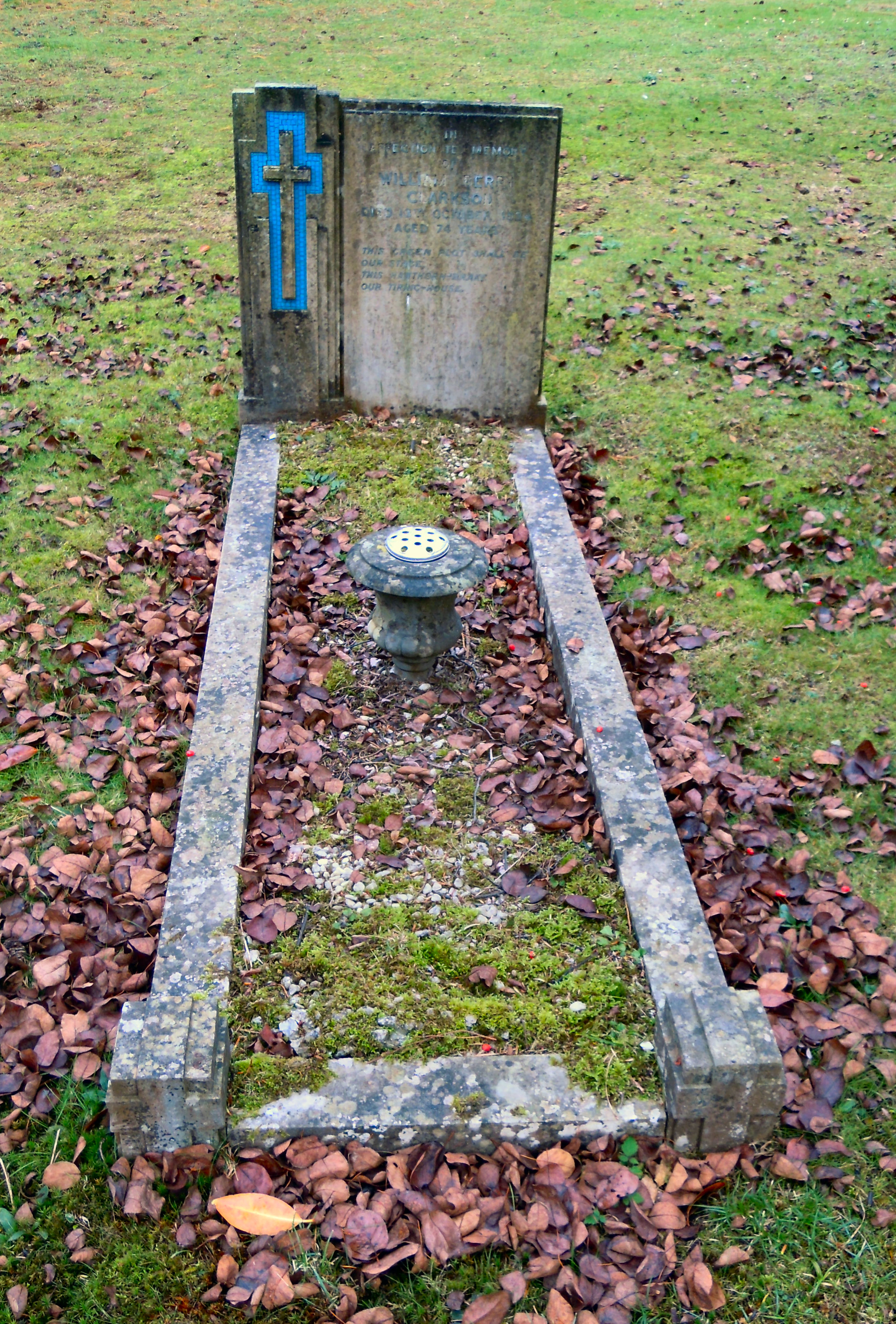
Grave of William Berry Clarkson in Brookwood Cemetery, 2016

On the night of 13 October 1934, Clarkson was found unconscious on his bedroom floor with a gash on his forehead. He was attended by Bertrand Dawson, the Royal Family's physician, but never regained consciousness. The circumstances of his death were considered sufficiently suspicions that an autopsy on his body was performed by the prominent pathologist, Sir Bernard Spilsbury, although he found no conclusive evidence of foul play. Clarkson's funeral was at St Paul's, Covent Garden (Note: Widely known as the actors church, due to its association with the theatre world.) and he was buried in a modest grave in the Actors' Acre in Brookwood Cemetery in Surrey, England.

Clarkson's will, dated 1929, left the bulk of his estate to his long-standing associate William Cooper Hobbs. However, the will was contested by Max Brezinski (Note: Brezinski was a stage magician who performed under the name of Fred Brezin.) and his daughter who possessed a 1931 will in which Clarkson left his estate to them. The Probate court decided in their favour in July 1935. The matter was investigated by the police detective Leonard Burt and in March 1938, Hobbs and a former solicitor, Edmond O'Connor (Note: An Irishman, O'Connor had been one of the most prominent solicitors in London and had acted in many notable trials during the 1920's, including defending William Podmore for the charge of murder. He had also defended Hobbs at his blackmail trial in 1925. However drink and gambling had driven him deeply into debt and he had fled to Ireland. He was destitute and living under a false name when he was arrested there.) went on trial, accused of together forging the earlier will. Both were convicted; Hobbs was sentenced to five years in prison and O'Connor to seven.

Neither party in the will dispute ultimately profited as Clarkson's estate was made insolvent by the successful claim against it by the fire insurers in 1937. However, his shop in Wardour street continued to trade until it closed in 1940.

== Legacy ==
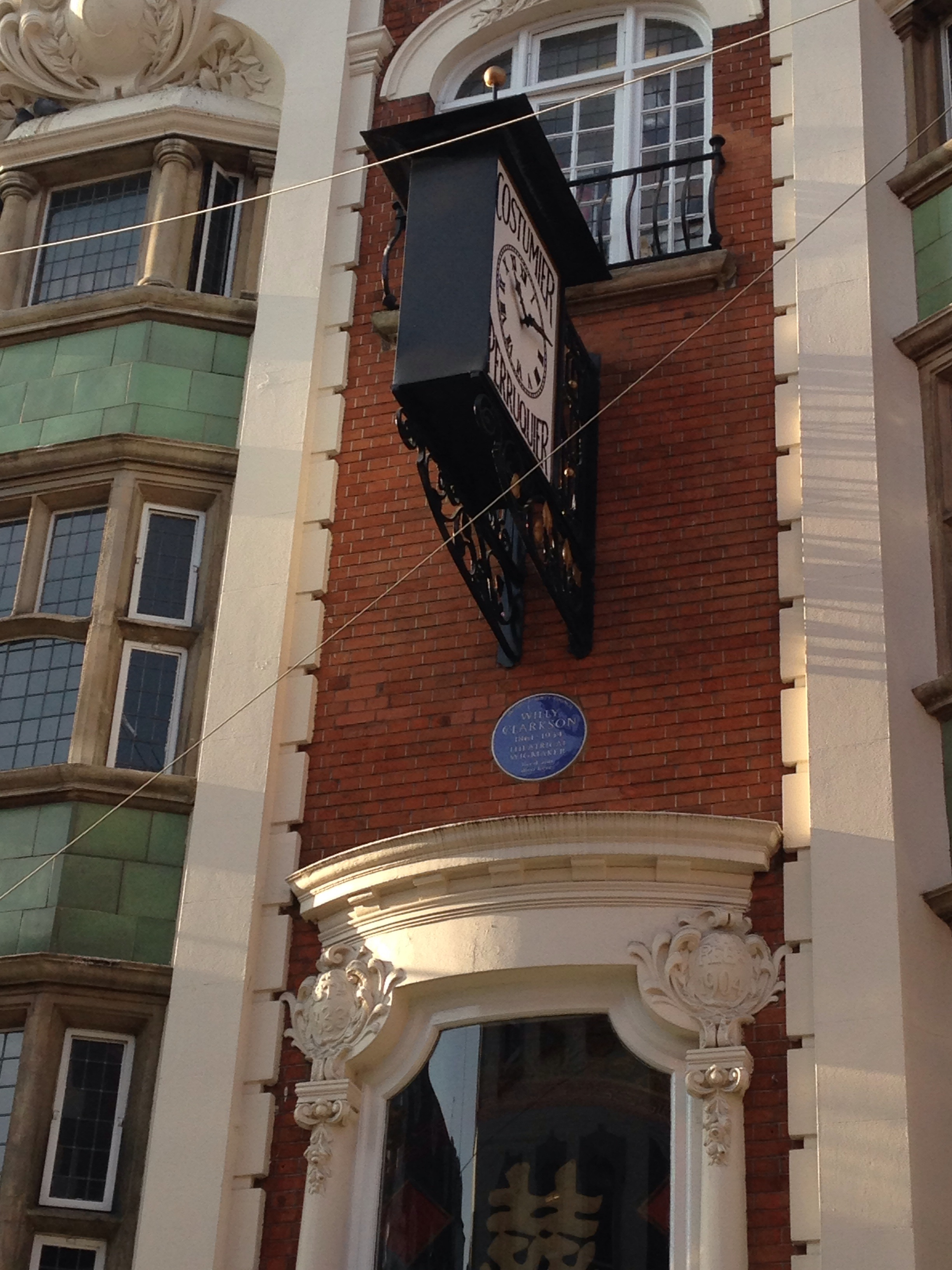
The blue plaque commemorating Clarkson, and the original Costumer and Perruquier advertising clock, 2016

A London County Council blue plaque unveiled in 1966 commemorates Clarkson at his former shop in Wardour street. The building retains a clock above the entrance, advertising it as the business premises of a Costumer and Perruquier. (Note: One who makes and sells perukes (wigs or hair pieces).) In 1974, the building was Grade II Listed. Since the 1980s, it has been occupied by the well-known Wong Kei Chinese restaurant.

Clarkson's ability at creating disguises is referenced in a number of novels. These include Gertie de S. Wentworth-James' The House of Chance (1911), Sax Rohmer's The Golden Scorpion (1919); The Clockwork Man by Edwin Vincent Odle (1923) – an early science-fiction novel featuring a time-travelling cyborg; Graham Seton Hutchison's Colonel Grant's To-morrow (1931); Black August (1934) by Dennis Wheatley; and Spy (1935) by Bernard Newman.

There is a chapter featuring a fictionalized version of Clarkson in The Reminiscences of the Hon Galahad Threepwood by N.T.P. Murphey (1993). This book is based on the fictional book by the character Galahad Threepwood, that is a plot device in a number of stories by P. G. Wodehouse.

Examples of Clarkson's wigs are in the collection of the Victoria and Albert Museum, including one possibly worn by the dancer Adeline Genée. The museum also has a complete Harlequin costume supplied by his company, that was worn on stage by Harold Chapin. The Museum of London has a Clarkson horsehair wig that was made specially for the famous clown, Whimsical Walker (Note: Born Thomas Walker (1851-1934).) and another that is claimed to have been worn on-stage by Sir Henry Irving.

== Jack the Ripper suspect ==
Clarkson has been named as a potential suspect in the 1888 Whitechapel murders attributed to "Jack the Ripper". This theory was first introduced and explored in the 2019 short film "The Wigmaker of Wellington Street".

== Gallery ==
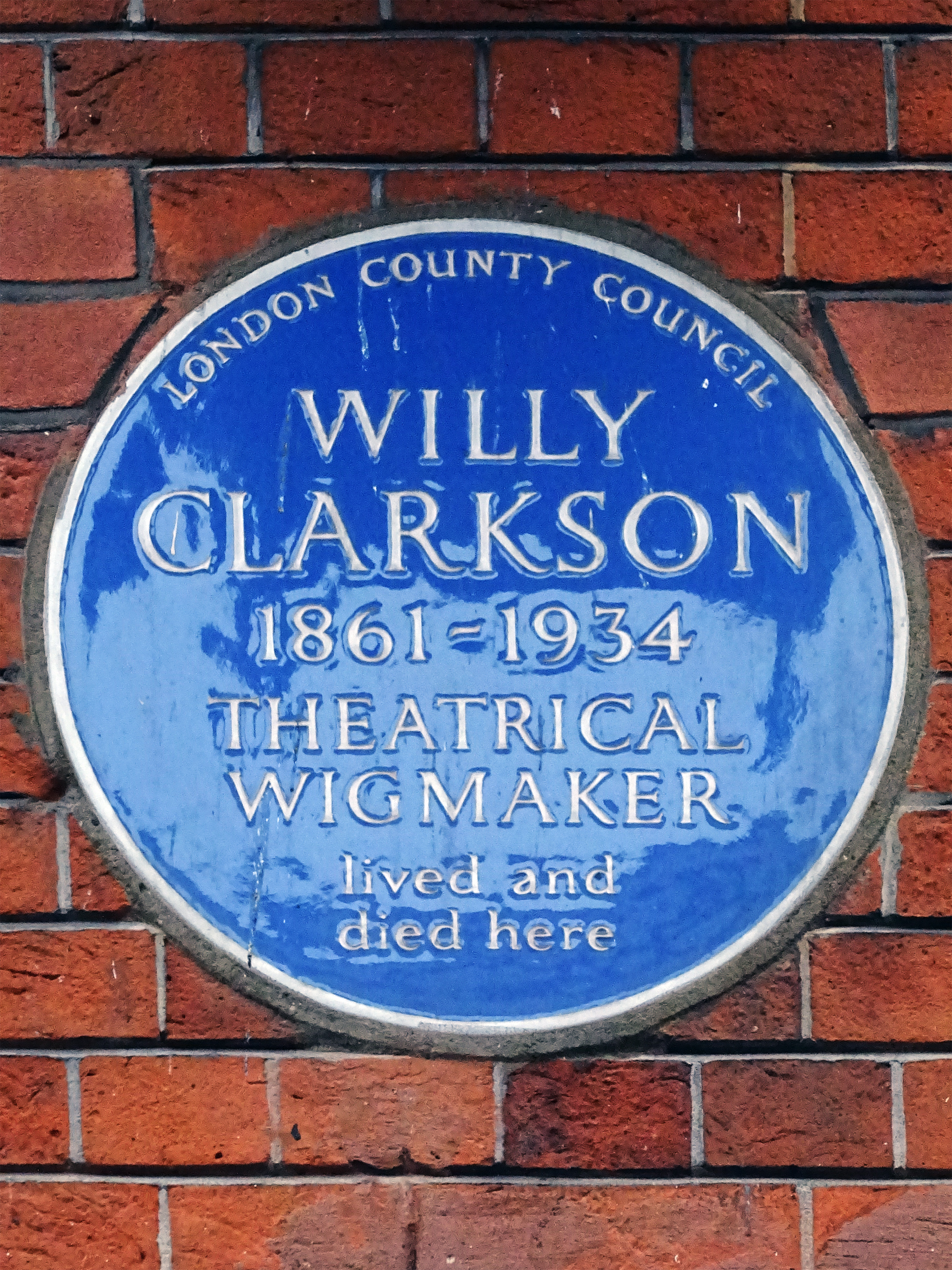
The blue plaque erected in 1966 by London County Council at 41-43 Wardour Street

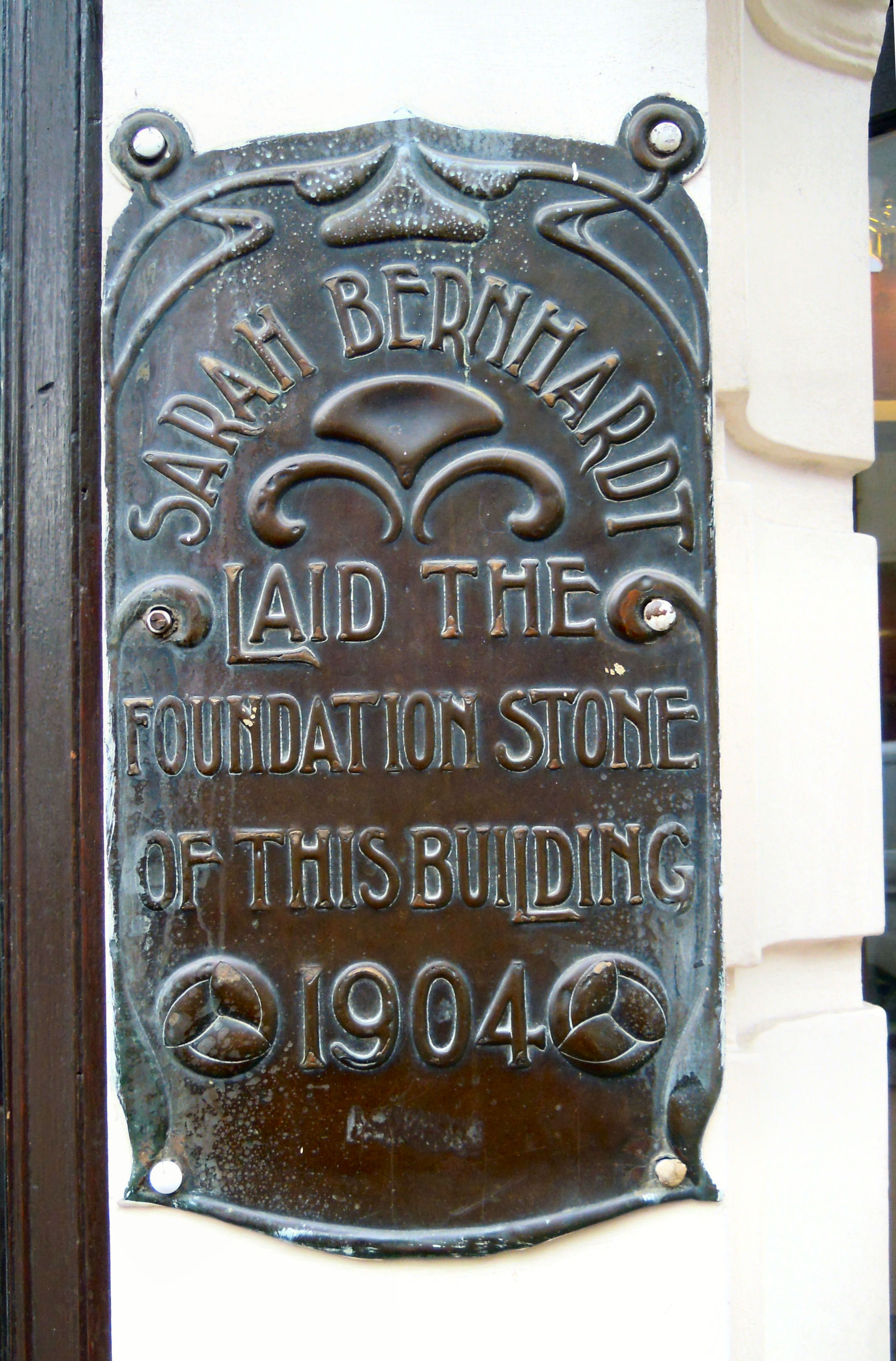
Plaque commemorating the foundation stone laid by Sarah Bernhardt in 1904

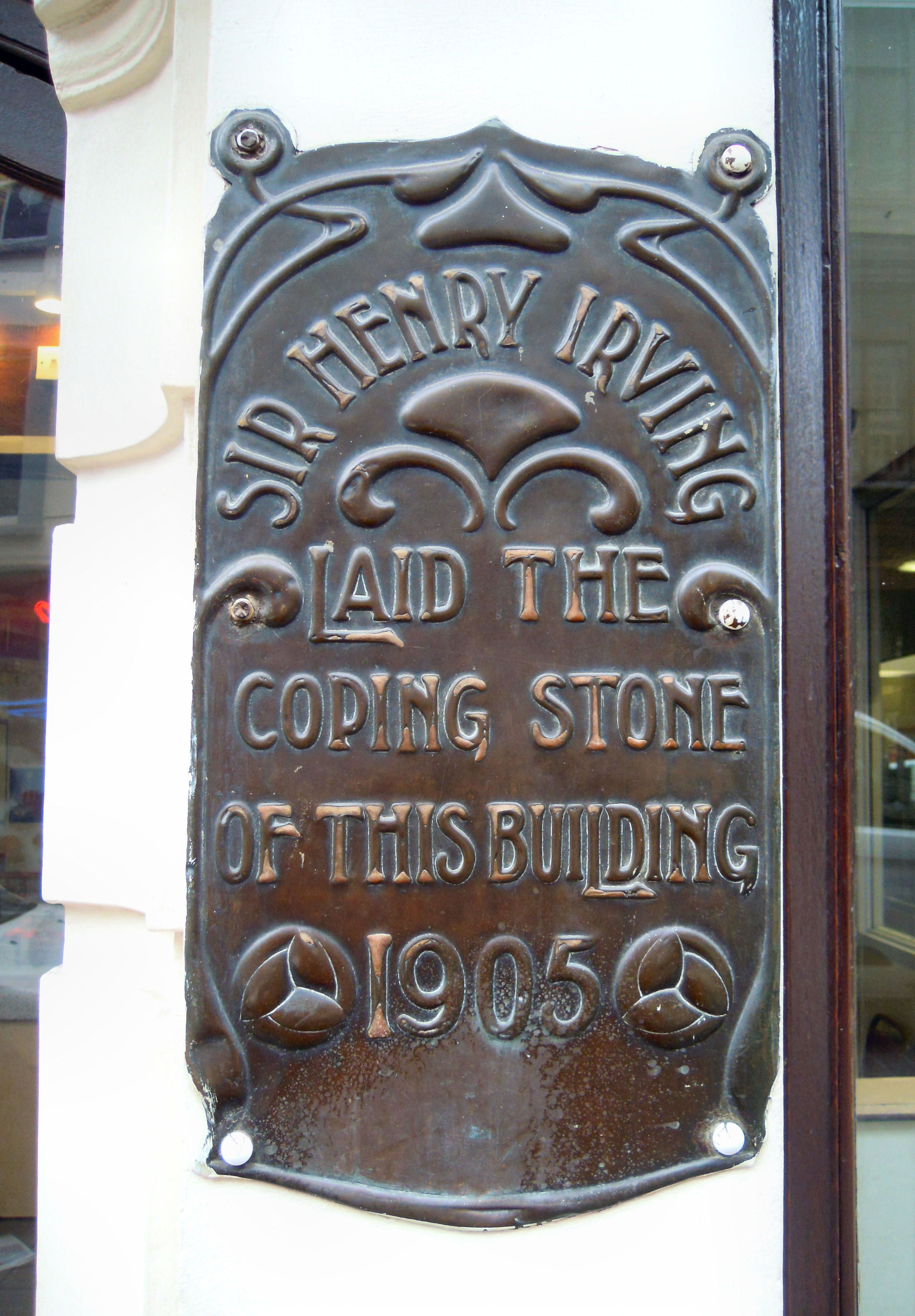
Plaque commemorating the coping stone laid by Henry Irving in 1905
