= Wardour Street =

Street in London, England

Coordinates: 51.51419°N 0.13456°W

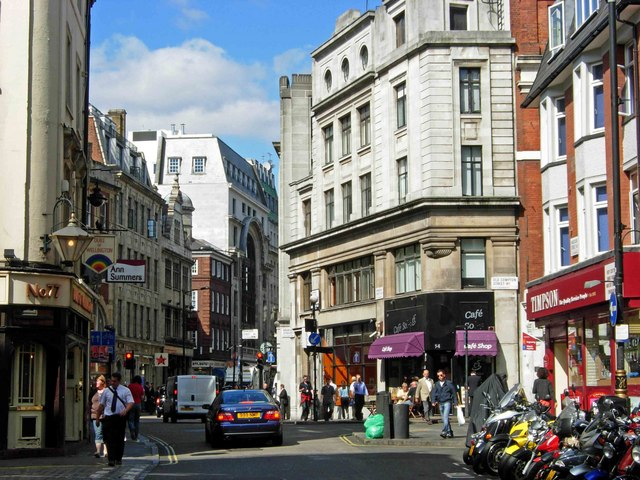
Wardour Street, looking north from outside St Anne's Church, Soho

Wardour Street (/ˈwɔːrdɔːr/) is a street in Soho, City of Westminster, London. It is a one-way street that runs north from Leicester Square, through Chinatown, across Shaftesbury Avenue to Oxford Street. Throughout the 20th century the West End street became a centre for the British film industry and the popular music scene.

== History ==
There has been a thoroughfare on the site of Wardour Street on maps and plans since they were first printed, the earliest being Elizabethan. In 1585, to settle a legal dispute, a plan of what is now the West End was prepared. The dispute was about a field roughly where Broadwick Street is today. The plan was very accurate and clearly gives the name Colmanhedge Lane to this major route across the fields from what is described as "The Waye from Vxbridge to London" (Oxford Street) to what is now Cockspur Street. The old plan shows that this lane follows the modern road almost exactly, including bends at Brewer Street and Old Compton Street.

The road is also a major thoroughfare on Faithorne and Newcourt's map surveyed between 1643 and 1647. Although they do not give it a name, it is shown to have about 24 houses, and additionally a large "Gaming House" roughly on the present-day northwest corner of Leicester Square. The map also shows a large windmill, about 50 yards to the west of what is now St Anne's Church, roughly on the current alignment of Great Windmill Street.

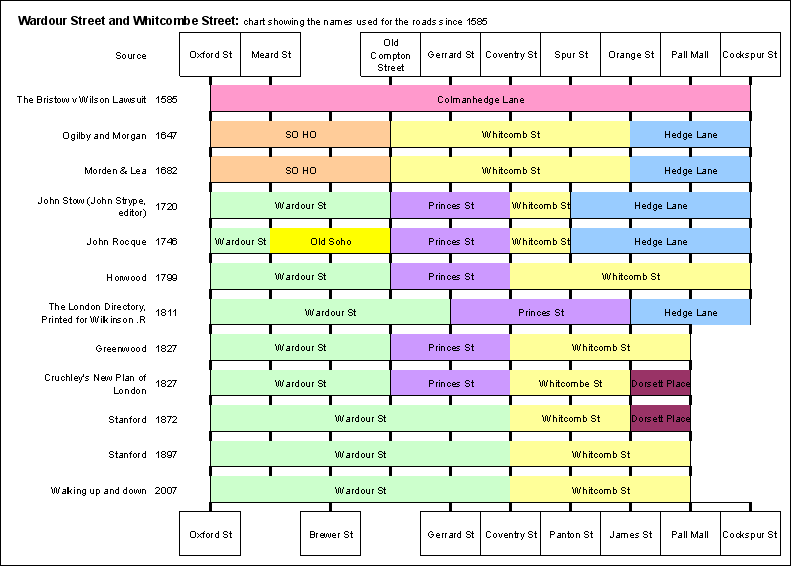
Changes of the street's name and extent since 1585

The name Colmanhedge Lane did not last, and a 1682 map by Ogilby and Morgan shows the lane split into three parts. The northern part is shown as SO HO, the middle part Whitcomb Street and the remainder, from James Street south, is Hedge Lane. It is not clear from the map where the boundary between SO HO and Whitcombe Street is—probably somewhere between Compton Street and Gerrard Street. These three names are on the Morden and Lea map of 1682.

Wardour Street was renamed and building began in 1686, as shown by a plaque formerly on the house at the corner with Broadwick Street. Sir Edward Wardour owned land in the area, and Edward Street was what is now the stretch of Broadwick Street between Wardour Street and Berwick Street, as shown by Roque. Neither side of the street was fully built up by 1720. John Rocque shows both roads very clearly on his large-scale map of 1746. From Oxford Street south to Meard Street is now Wardour Street; then south to Compton Street is Old Soho; then down to Coventry Street is Princes Street. For the length of Leicester Square it is Whitcomb Street and finally Hedge Lane, which now starts at Panton Street rather than James Street.

By the end of the 18th century, Horwood, on a large map of 1799, uses the same names but not Old Soho and Hedge Lane. This leaves just Wardour, Princes and Whitcomb streets. The houses have individual numbers by then, and are shown in detail on Horwood's map.

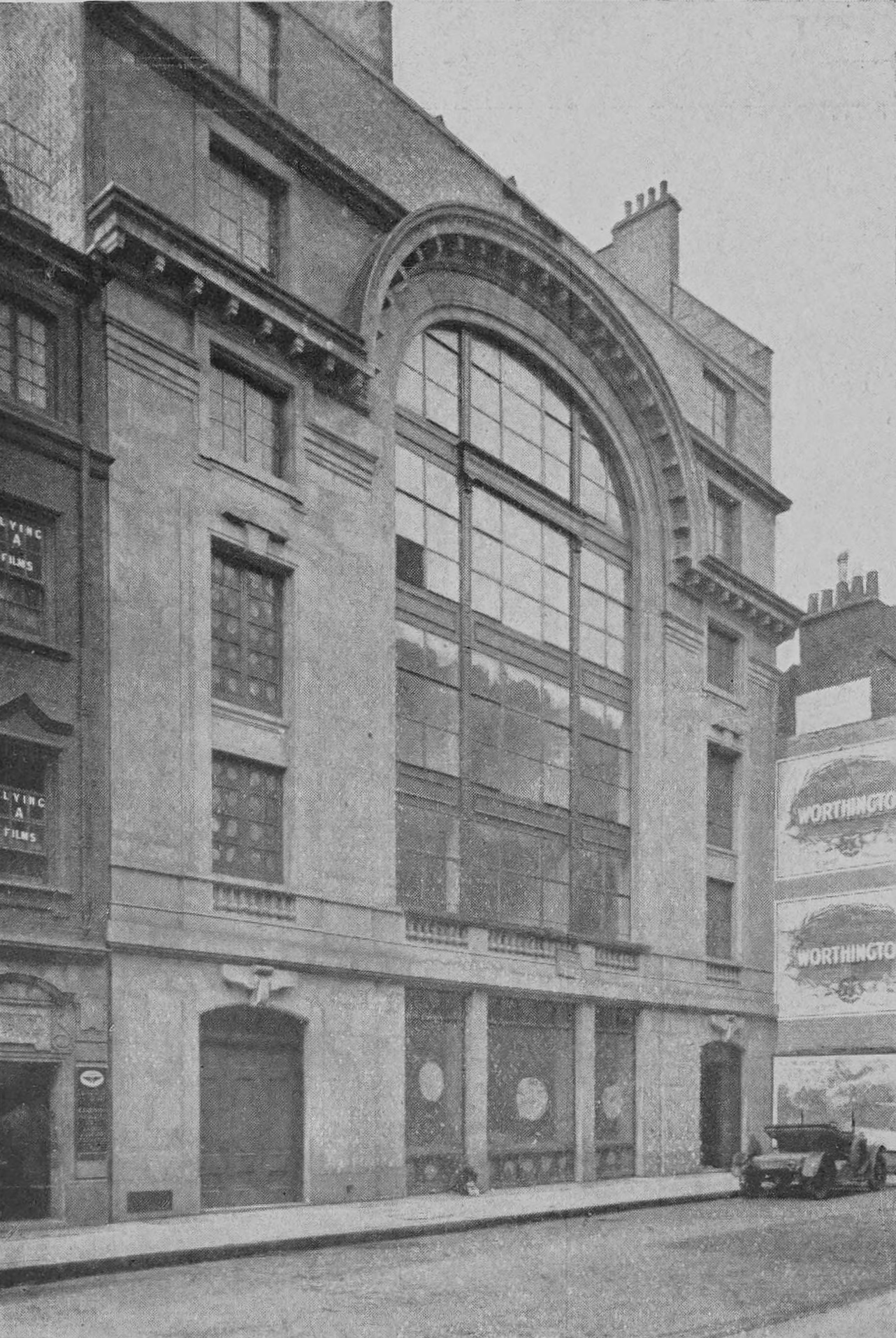
The 1913 Pathé building at 103-109 Wardour, designed by Detmar Blow and Ferdinand Billerey

The names are much the same on Greenwood's map of 1827, although the area at the southern end had been redeveloped. The road now ends at Pall Mall East, and the boundary between Wardour and Princes streets may have moved north a little.

By 1846, Cruchley's new plan of London shows change at the southern end. Wardour, Princes and Whitcomb streets stay the same; however, Whitcomb Street loses a few hundred yards at the southern end, and from James Street to Pall Mall is now Dorset Place.

In Victorian times, Princes Street is still shown on the 1871 Ordnance Survey map. Stanford's Map of Central London 1897, at 6 inches (15 cm) to a mile (1:10560), has just two names, Wardour Street from Oxford Street to Coventry Street, and Whitcomb Street south from there. It has remained like this since, though the numbering of premises was rationalised around 1896.

In the late 19th century, Wardour Street was known for (sometimes slightly shoddy) furniture stores, antique shops, and dealers in artists' supplies. A complicated succession of members of the Wright family were in business in a variety of art and furniture-related fields between 1827 and 1919 at numbers 22 (the first and last), and also 23, 26, 134 and 144, with at least two businesses run by cousins in the latter part of the century. Wright was used for picture frames by the new National Gallery from at least 1856, when they made the large new frame for the Adoration of the Magi by Paolo Veronese that is still in place. The phrase "Wardour Street English" denotes the use of near-obsolete words purely for effect. An example is anent, a preposition, meaning "concerning". This usage derives from the once great number of antique shops in the area. The Paris-born luthier Georges Chanot III had a shop and violin-making business at no. 157 for many years.

== 20th century ==
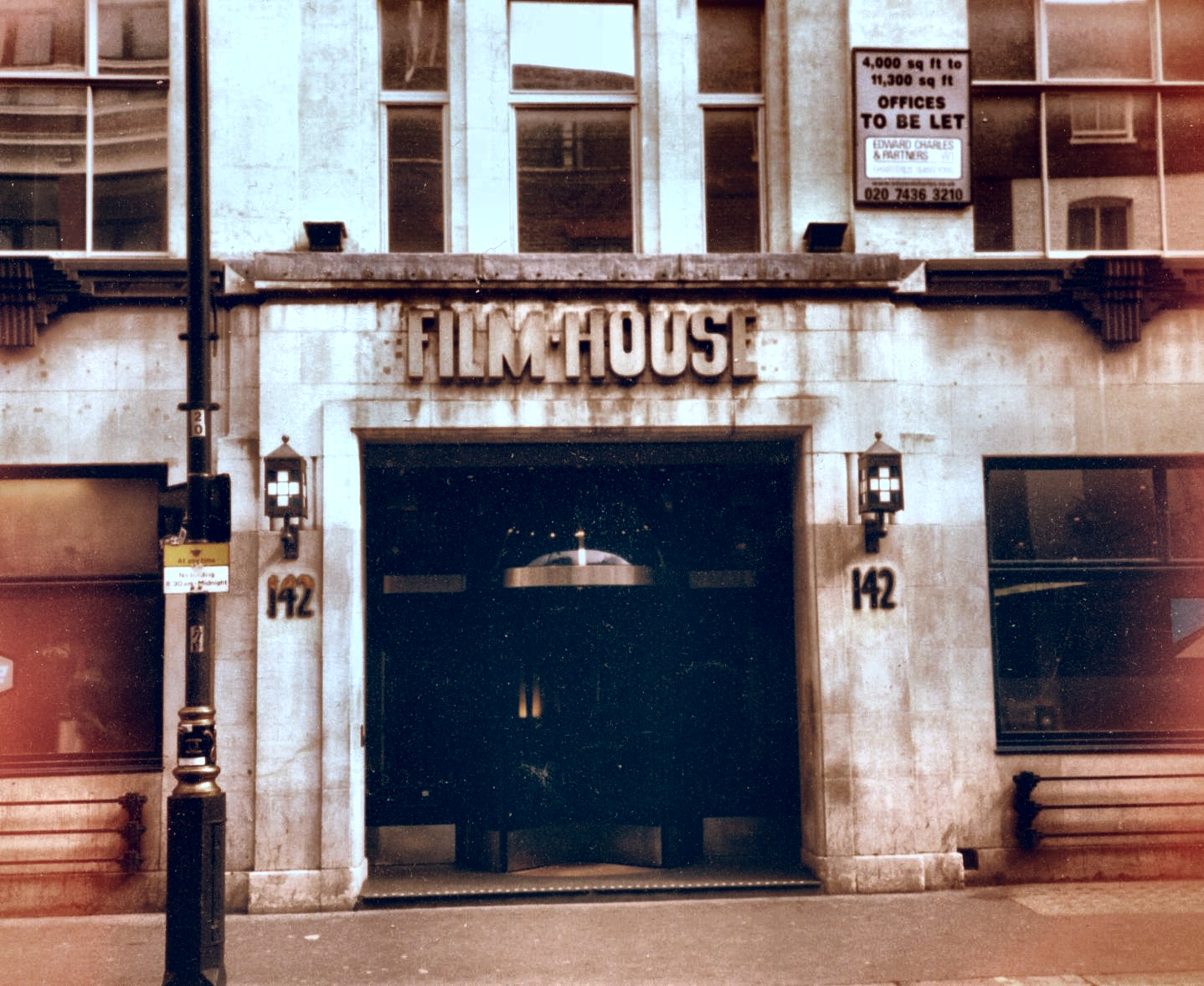
Film House at 142 Wardour Street, formerly the headquarters of the Associated British-Pathé film company

During this period, it became a centre of the British film industry, with the big production and distribution companies having their headquarters in the street. By the end of the century most of the big film companies had moved elsewhere, leaving some smaller independent production houses and post-production companies still based in the area.

From 1935, the Shim Sham Club, an unlicensed jazz club popular with black and gay audiences run by Ike Hatch, and its successor the Rainbow Roof, were at 37 Wardour Street. The Flamingo Club was situated at numbers 33–37 from 1957 until 1967. The Vortex Club at 203 Wardour Street is mentioned in a song by the Jam, "A-Bomb in Wardour Street". Based in the discothèque Crackers, in 1977 the club hosted early concerts by punk bands such as Siouxsie and the Banshees, the Slits and Adam and the Ants. From 1964 to 1988, number 90 was the site of the Marquee Club, and since the late 1960s, number 159 has been the home of the St Moritz nightclub. The Eric Gilder School of Music was at 195 Wardour Street (its original building is now demolished).

== 21st century ==
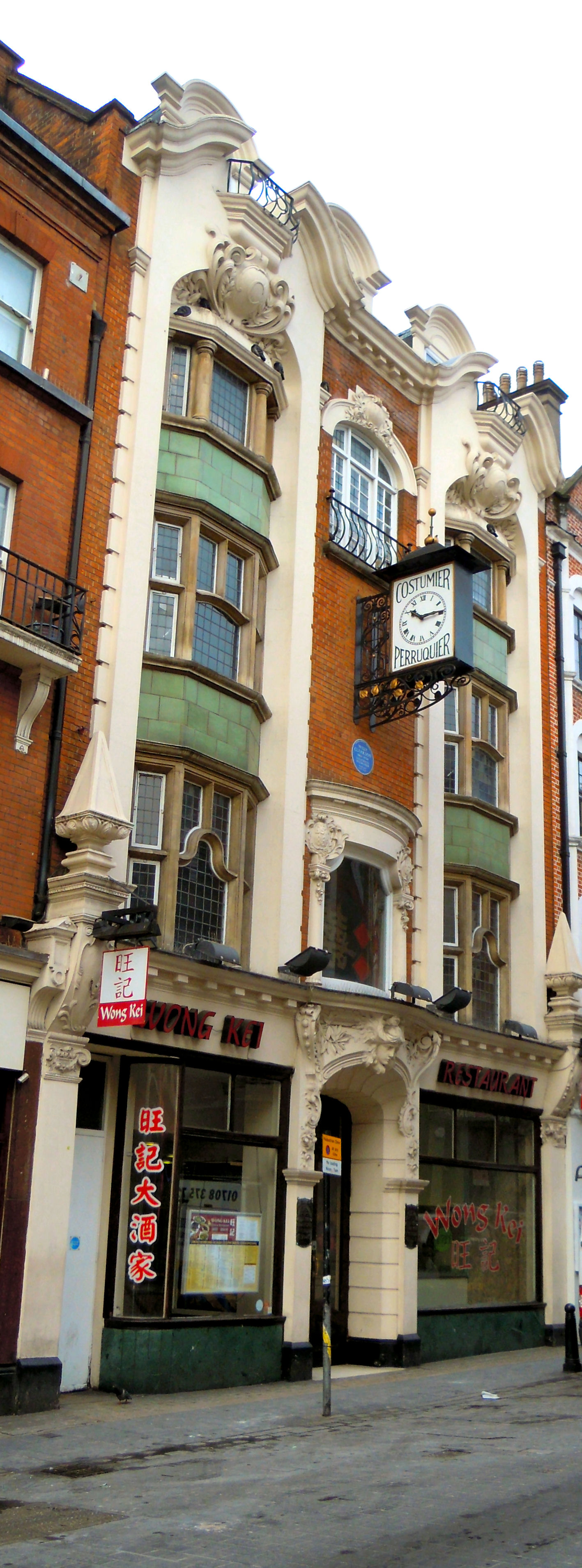
The former premises of Willy Clarkson on Wardour Street

The street is home to more than 30 restaurants and bars north of Shaftesbury Avenue. South of Shaftesbury Avenue there are many well-known Chinese restaurants including the large Wong Kei at 41–43. A London County Council blue plaque on Wong Kei's commemorates costume designer and wigmaker Willy Clarkson whose business was based in the building.

The street crosses, or meets with, Lisle Street, Gerrard Street, Rupert Court, Dansey Place, Shaftesbury Avenue, Winette Street, Tisbury Court, Old Compton Street, Brewer Street, Bourchier Street, Peter Street, Tyler's Court, Flaxman Court, Broadwick Street, St Anne's Court, Sheraton Street, D'Arblay Street, Hollen Street, Noel Street and Oxford Street.

== Chinese Name ==
The street signs of Wardour Street appear in both English and Chinese, where the meaning of the Chinese name (華都街) is likely "Chinese Metropolis Street" given the vicinity of Chinatown.

== See also ==
- List of eponymous roads in London
- Wardour Street English
