= Chinatown, London =

Ethnic enclave in Westminster, London, England

Coordinates: 51°30′40″N 0°07′53″W

Chinatown, London: 倫敦唐人街
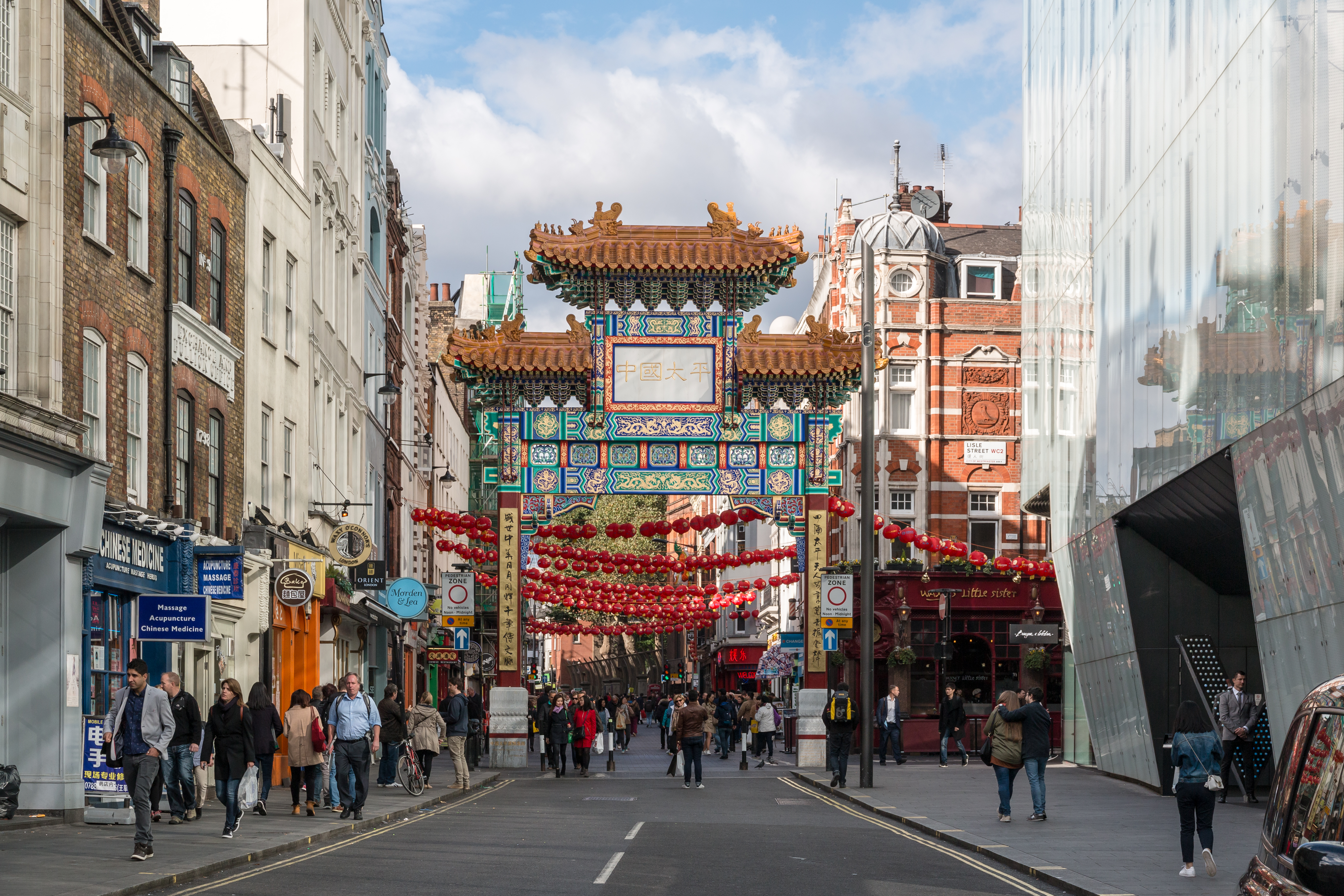
- Main gate on Wardour Street
- London borough: Westminster
- Ceremonial county: Greater London
- Region: London
- Country: England
- Sovereign state: United Kingdom
- Post town: LONDON
- Postcode district: W1D
- Dialling code: 020
- Police: Metropolitan
- Fire: London
- Ambulance: London
- UK Parliament: Cities of London and Westminster
- London Assembly: West Central

London Chinatown
- Traditional Chinese: 倫敦唐人街
- Simplified Chinese: 伦敦唐人街
Transcriptions
Standard Mandarin
- Hanyu Pinyin: Lúndūn Tángrénjiē
- IPA: [lwə̌ntwə́n tʰǎŋɻə̌ntɕjé]
Yue: Cantonese
- Yale Romanization: lèuhn dēun tòhng yàhn gāai
- Jyutping: leon^{4} deon^{1} tong^{4} jan^{4} gaai^{1}
- IPA: [lɵ̏ntɵ́n tʰɔ̏ːŋjɐ̏nkáːi]

Alternative Chinese name
- Traditional Chinese: 倫敦華埠
- Simplified Chinese: 伦敦华埠
Transcriptions
Standard Mandarin
- Hanyu Pinyin: Lúndūn Huábù
- IPA: [lwə̌ntʰwə́n xwǎpʰû]
Yue: Cantonese
- Yale Romanization: lèuhn dēun wàh fauh
- Jyutping: leon^{4} deon^{1} waa^{4} fau^{6}

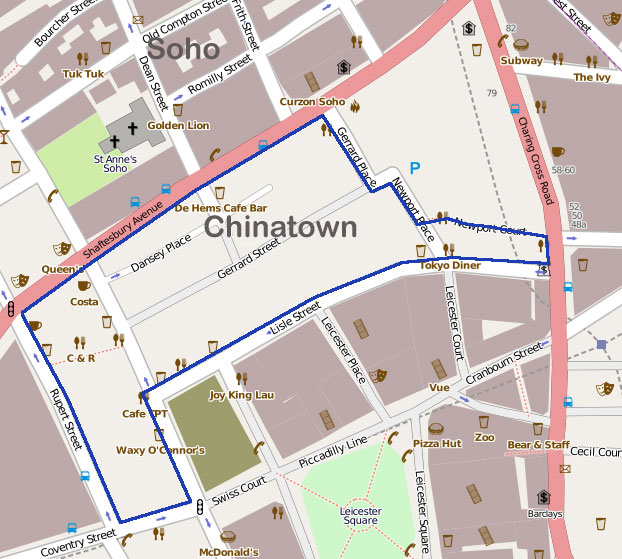
Map of the Chinatown area

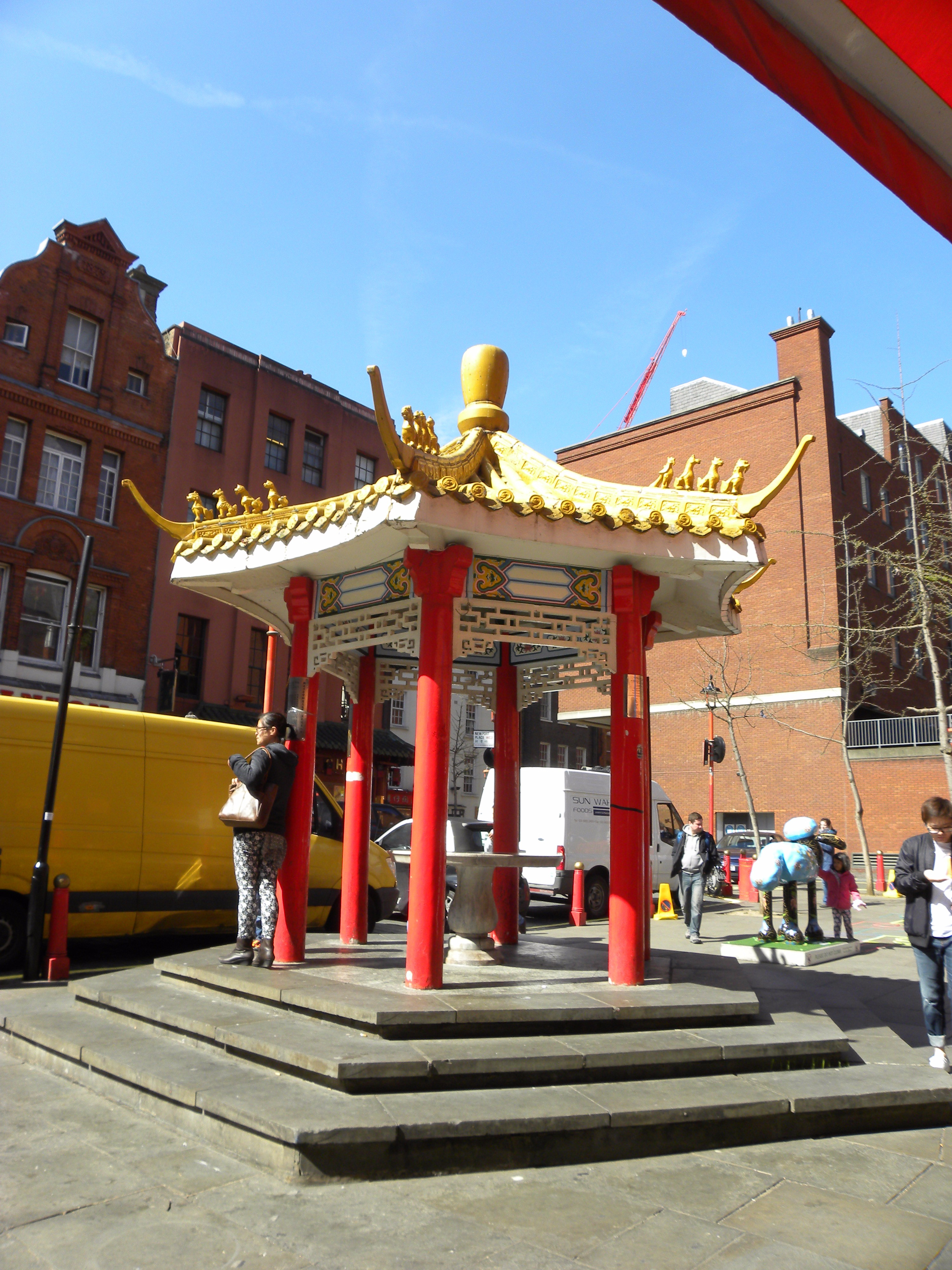
Chinese pavilion at Newport Place, removed in 2016

Chinatown is an ethnic enclave in the City of Westminster, London, bordering Soho to its north and west and Theatreland to the south and east. The enclave currently occupies the area in and around Gerrard Street. It contains a number of Chinese restaurants, bakeries, supermarkets, souvenir shops, and other Chinese-run businesses. The first Chinatown was located in Limehouse in the East End.

== History ==
The first area in London known as Chinatown was located in the Limehouse area of the East End of London. At the start of the 20th century, the Chinese population of London was concentrated in that area, setting up businesses which catered to the Chinese sailors who frequented in Docklands. The area was known through exaggerated reports and tales of slum housing and (at that time legal) opium dens, rather than the Chinese restaurants and supermarkets of the current Chinatown. However, much of the area was damaged by aerial bombing during the Blitz in the Second World War, although a number of elderly Chinese still choose to live in this area. After the Second World War, however, the growing popularity of Chinese cuisine and an influx of immigrants from Hong Kong led to an increasing number of Chinese restaurants being opened elsewhere.

The present Chinatown, which is off Shaftesbury Avenue, started to be recognised as such by the 1970s. Previously, it was a regular Soho area, run-down, with Gerrard Street the main thoroughfare. It was dominated by the Post Office, facing Macclesfield Street; other major establishments were The Tailor & Cutter House, at 43/44, now a Chinese supermarket and restaurant; the Boulogne Restaurant, near the Wardour Street end; and Peter Mario's Restaurant at the other end. Other businesses included a master baker's, the Sari Centre, Lesgrain French Coffee House, Harrison Marks's Glamour Studio, an Indian restaurant, and various brothels. Probably the first Chinese restaurants opened in Lisle Street, parallel to Gerrard Street, and more opened gradually; one of the first restaurants was Kowloon Restaurant. The Tailor & Cutter did not close down until around 1974. The area now has more than 80 restaurants.

In 2005, the property developer Rosewheel proposed a plan to redevelop the eastern part of Chinatown. The plan was opposed by many of the existing retailers in Chinatown, for they believed that the redevelopment would drive out the traditional Chinese retail stores from the area and change the ethnic characteristics of Chinatown.

The London Chinatown Community Centre (LCCC) has been housed in the Chinatown area since it was founded in 1980 by Dr Abraham Lue. The Centre claims to have received 40,000 people for help and assistance since its foundation. Located since 1998 on the second floor of 28–29 Gerrard Street, the Centre relocated to 2 Leicester Court in 2012, above the Hippodrome Casino. In October 2013 and July 2018, the London Chinatown Community Centre (LCCC) organised a one-day shutdown in protest of violent tactics by immigration officers from the Home Office.

On 25 July 2016, a new Chinatown gate on Wardour Street was opened by the then Prince Andrew, Duke of York (later Andrew Mountbatten-Windsor). It was made by Chinese artisans and assembled in London. The gate is in the style of the Qing dynasty.

There was a Chinese-style pavilion at Newport Place from the 1980s which was a popular meeting point, but it was demolished in 2016 after more than thirty years, despite protests. The development authorities had plans to renovate and enlarge the square. The construction of a new pavilion at a different location was announced.

== Geography ==
Chinatown has no officially defined size, but it has commonly been considered to approximately encompass Gerrard Street, the bottom half of Wardour Street, Rupert Street and Rupert Court, a section of Shaftesbury Avenue and Lisle Street, Macclesfield Street and Newport Place, Newport Court and Little Newport Street.

- Charing Cross Road – built 1887, and named as it led to the cross at Charing, from the Old English word "cierring", referring to a bend in the River Thames
- Coventry Street – after Henry Coventry, Secretary of State to Charles II, who lived near here in Shaver's Hall
- Cranbourn Street – built in the 1670s and named after local landowner the Earl of Salisbury, Viscount Cranbourn (or Cranbourne) after the town in Dorset
- Dansey Place – unknown; formerly named George Yard, after a pub adjacent called the George and Dragon
- Gerrard Place and Gerrard Street – after Charles Gerard, 1st Earl of Macclesfield, who owned this land when the street as built in the 1680s; the form 'Gerrard' developed in the 19th century
- Great Windmill Street – after a windmill that formerly stood near here in Ham Yard in the 16th and 17th centuries; the 'great' prefix was to distinguish it from Little Windmill Street, now Lexington Street
- Horse and Dolphin Yard – after the Horse and Dolphin inn which stood here in the 17th – 19th centuries
- Leicester Court, Leicester Place, Leicester Square and Leicester Street – in the 17th and 18th centuries on the north side of the square was Leicester House, built by Robert Sidney, 2nd Earl of Leicester, and later the residence of Frederick, Prince of Wales; Leicester Court was formerly Ryder Court, after a local leaseholder, Richard Ryder, but was renamed in 1936
- Lisle Street – after Philip, Viscount Lisle, who succeeded to the earldom of Leicester in 1677
- Macclesfield Street – after Charles Gerard, 1st Earl of Macclesfield, local landowner in the 17th century
- Newport Court, Newport Place and Little Newport Street – after Mountjoy Blount, Earl of Newport (Isle of Wight), who owned a house on this street (then just Newport Street) in the 17th century. Following the construction of Charing Cross Road, Newport Street was split in two and the two sections renamed as they are today
- Rupert Court and Rupert Street – after Prince Rupert of the Rhine, noted 17th-century general and son of Elizabeth Stuart, daughter of King James I; he was First Lord of the Admiralty when this street was built in 1676
- Shaftesbury Avenue – after Anthony Ashley Cooper, 7th Earl of Shaftesbury, Victorian politician and philanthropist
- Wardour Street – named after local 17th-century landowners the Wardour family, and formerly called Colman Hedge Lane/Close after a nearby field; the section south of Brewer Street was formerly Prince Street prior to 1878, in parallel with Rupert Street

According to Paul Barker of the Institute of Community Studies, as of 1998, relatively few people of Chinese ancestry lived in Chinatown, and it instead served as an ethnic meeting place.

== Education ==
The City of Westminster operates the Charing Cross Library with the Westminster Chinese Library.

== Transport ==
The nearest London Underground stations are Leicester Square and Piccadilly Circus.

== Popular culture ==
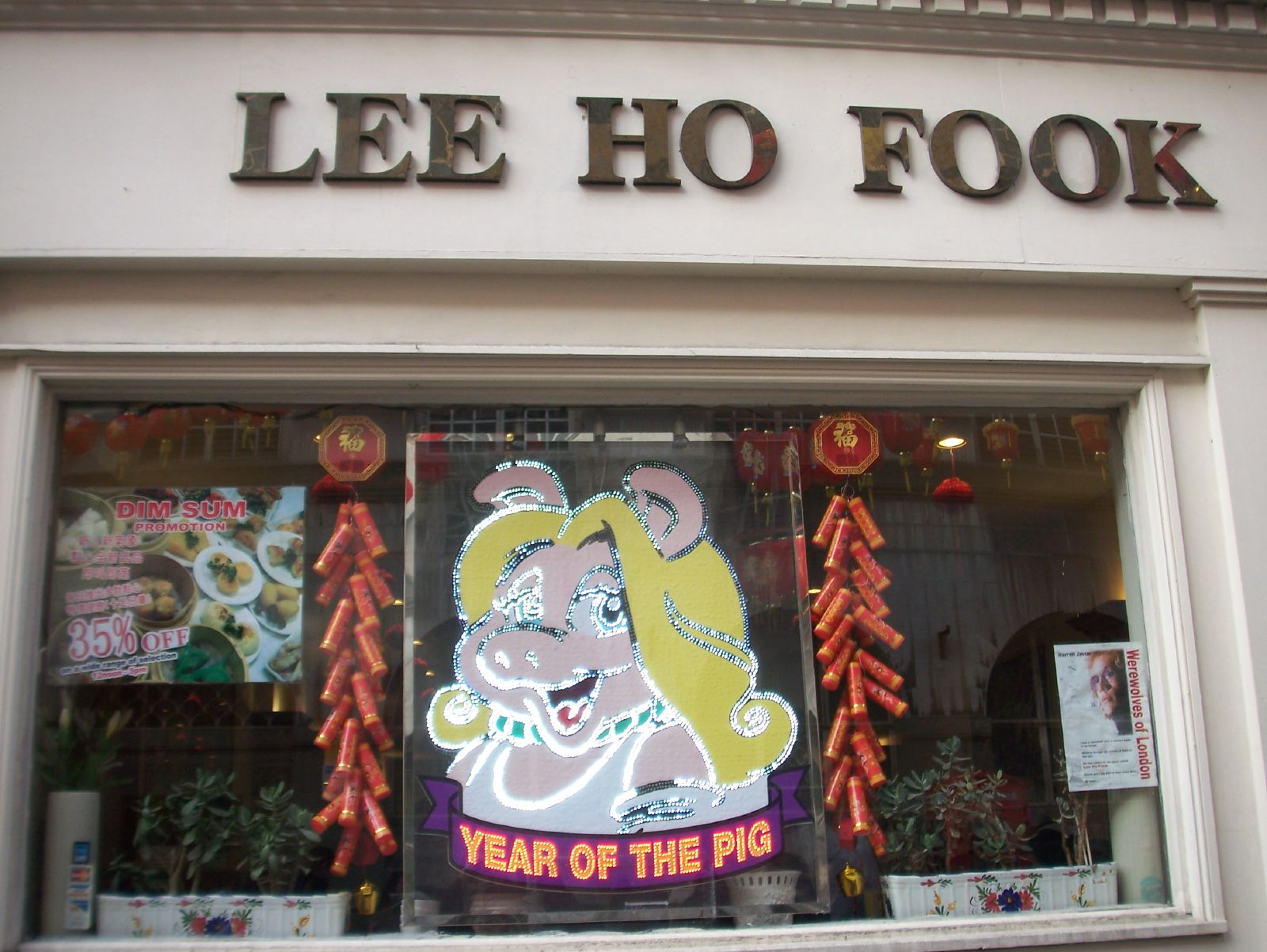
Lee Ho Fook's is referenced in "Werewolves of London"

The lyrics of Warren Zevon's 1978 hit song "Werewolves of London" include: "He was looking for the place called Lee Ho Fook's / Gonna get a big dish of beef chow mein". These lines refer to Lee Ho Fook, a Chinese restaurant that stood on 15 Gerrard Street.

The films Ping Pong (1986) and Soursweet (1988) are set in Chinatown; they are regarded as the first British-Chinese films, and make extensive use of Chinatown locations.

== Car park ==
There is a China Town car park, which is underneath Vale Royal House, a large residential block in Newport Court, both built in the 1980s and managed by Westminster City Council.

== Gallery ==
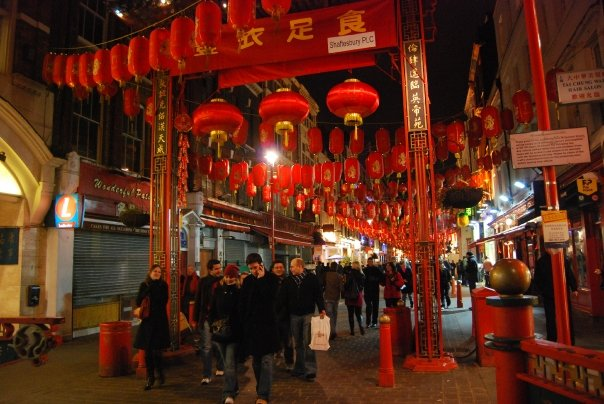
Chinatown, New Year 2009

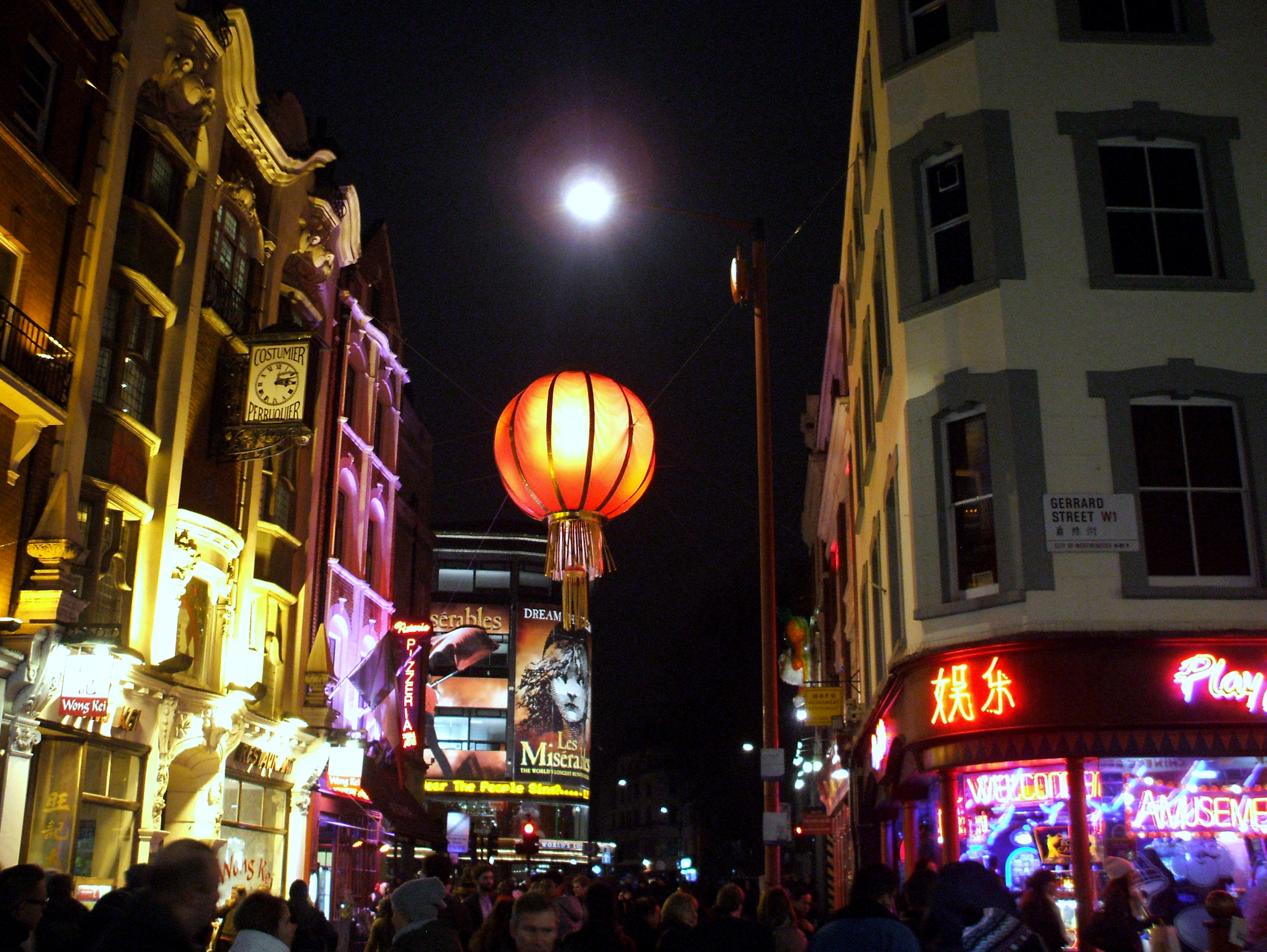
The corner of Gerrard Street, 2013

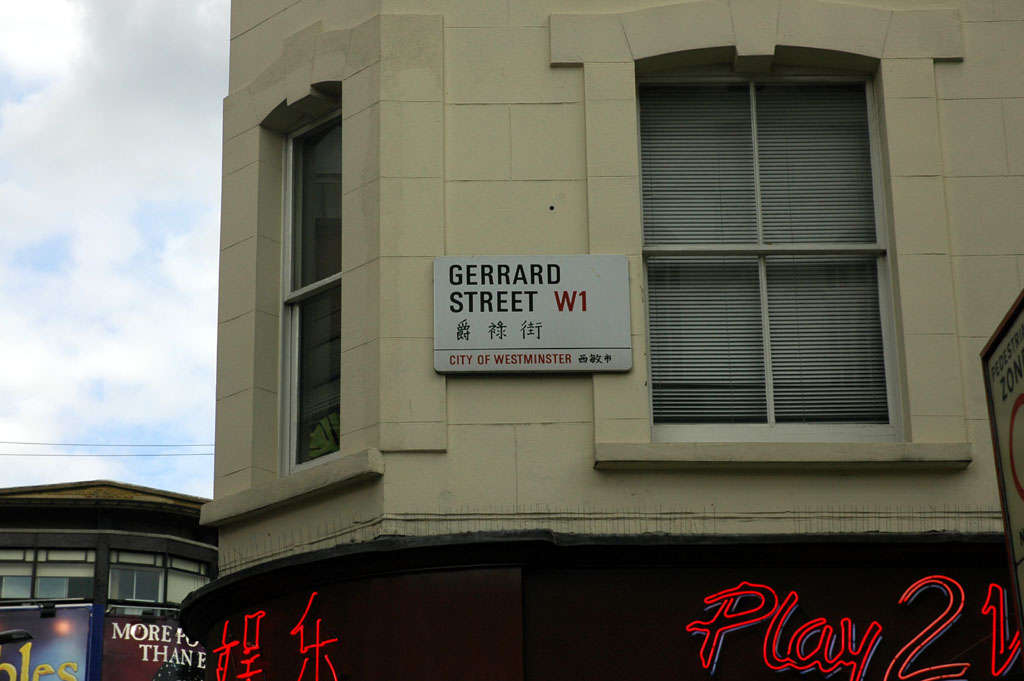
Bilingual street sign

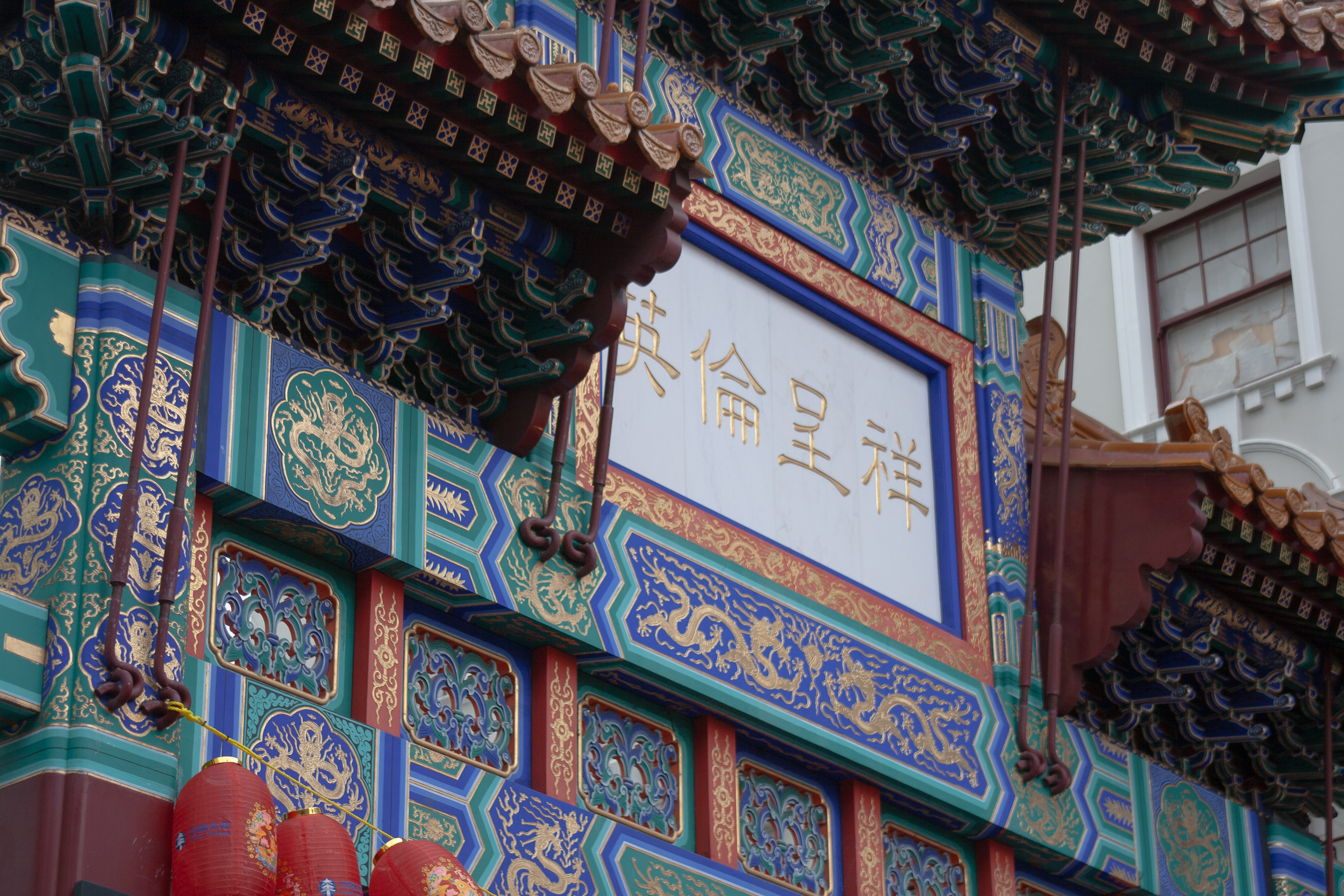
Details of the entrance gate on Wardour Street

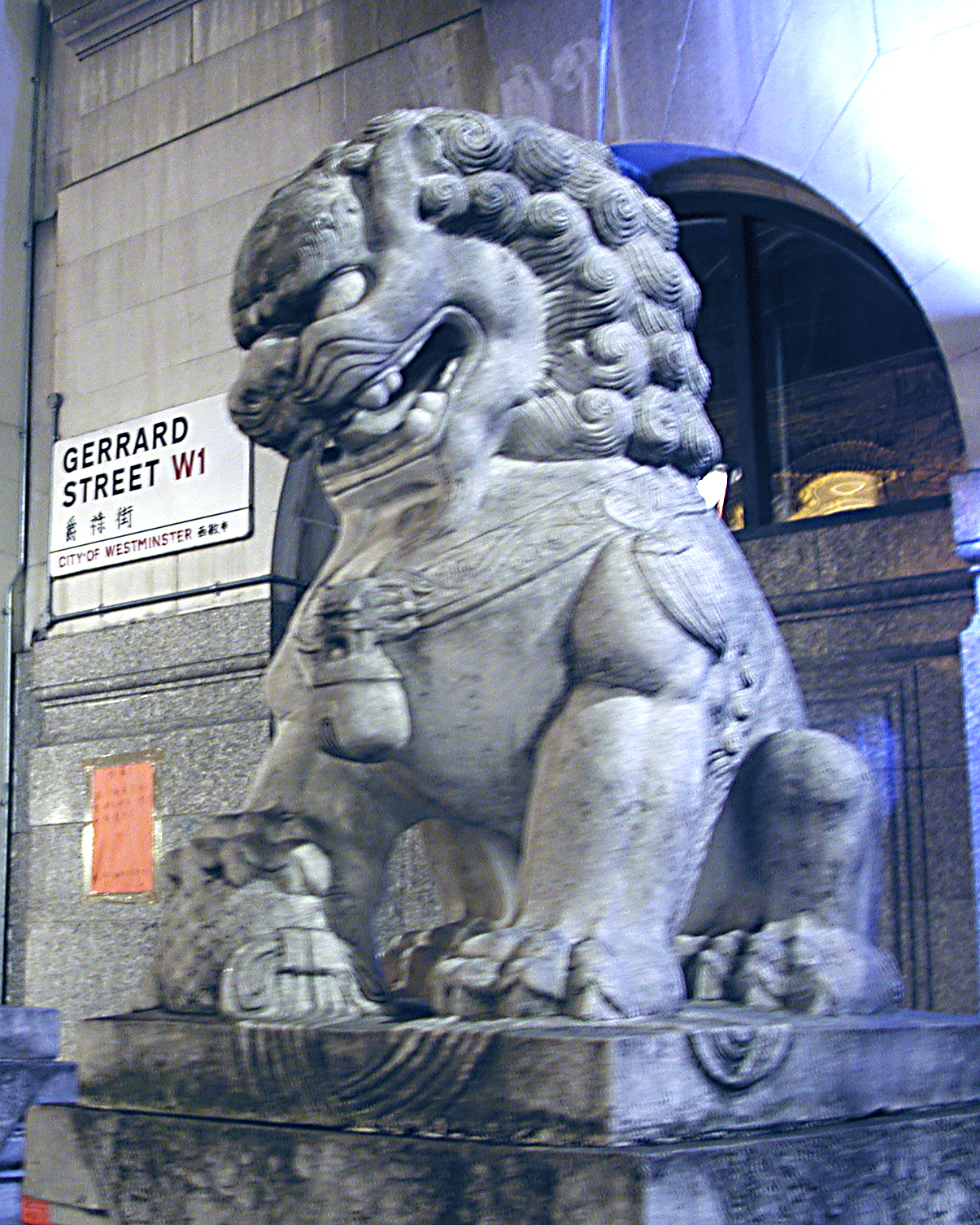
A stone lion on Gerrard Street. Note the bilingual English/Chinese street sign in the background.

== See also ==
- Brick Lane
- Chinese community in London
- British Chinese
- Wong Kei
