= Lee Ho Fook =

Chinese restaurant in Chinatown, London

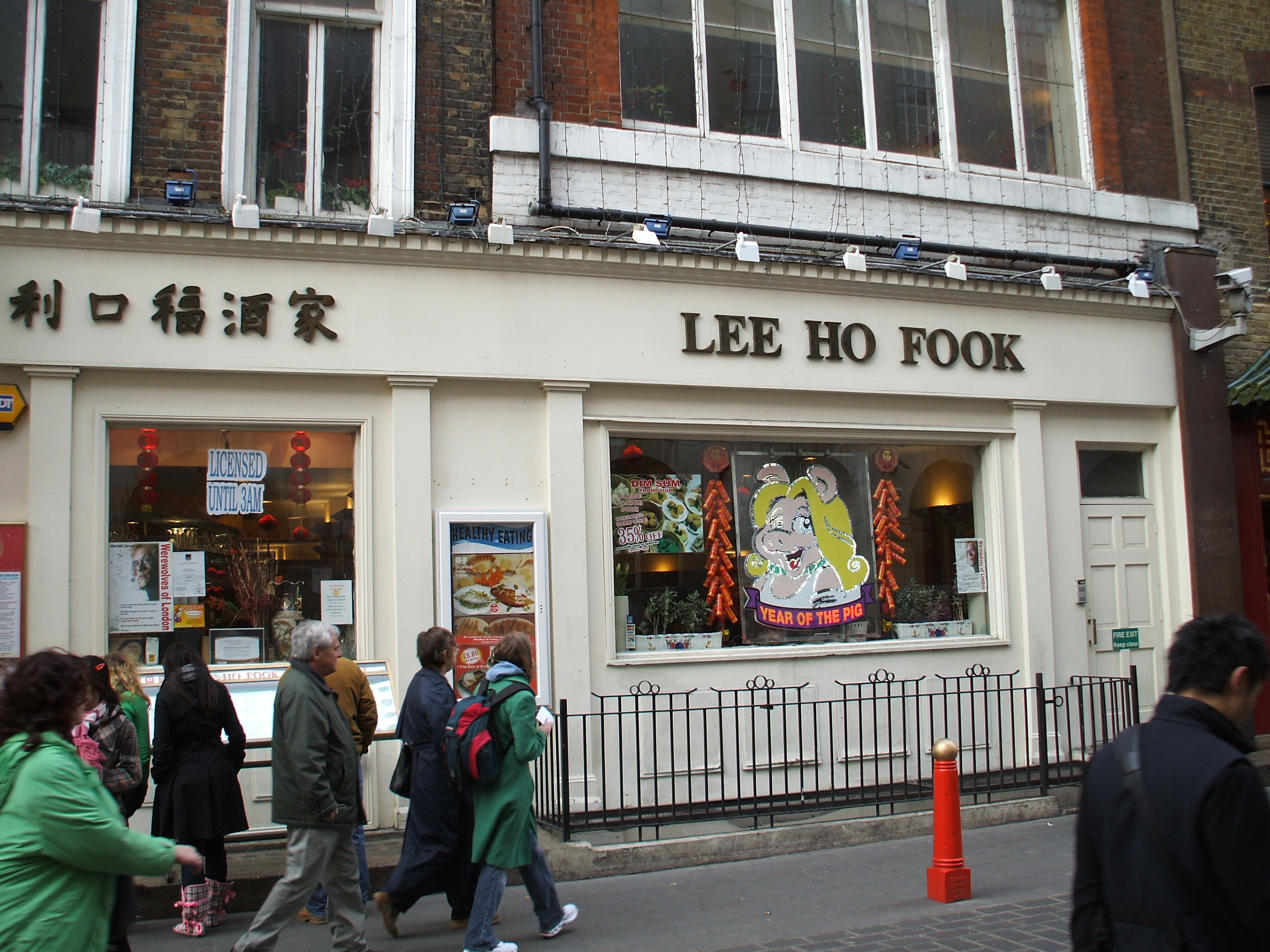
- Lee Ho Fook in January 2008
- Interactive map of Lee Ho Fook

Restaurant information
- Closed: 2008
- Location: 15–16 Gerrard Street, London, W1D 6JE, United Kingdom
- Coordinates: 51.5117°N 0.1314°W

Lee Ho Fook (Chinese: 利口福) was a Chinese restaurant located in Chinatown, London, at 15–16 Gerrard Street. It was originally located at 4 Macclesfield Street and continued to operate out of that site, known as Lee Ho Fook II, as well as Gerard Street, for several decades. In 1974, it became the first Chinese restaurant in the United Kingdom to be awarded a Michelin Star. The restaurant is mentioned in the 1978 song "Werewolves of London" by Warren Zevon.

Lee Ho Fook closed in 2008, and was replaced by a restaurant called Golden Harvest, which was itself replaced by Dumplings' Legend, which specialises in soup-filled dumplings.

== Reviews ==
A 1968 review of Lee Ho Fook in The Times described it as "undoubtedly one of the best new Cantonese restaurants in London". One of the three owners of the restaurant, Vincent Tsui told The Times that initially they had not expected their cooking to appeal to English people but found that they had come regularly and that "We're not going to make any concessions". A small card with the Chinese names of dishes to present to waiters was given to customers who only spoke English. The 1969 edition of The Good Food Guide praised Lee Ho Fook's "strikingly individual cooking" as "the work of an artist".

William F. Heintz called it "one of the top places to dine in all of London" in a review for The Chinese-American News Magazine in 1974.

A 1978 review for the New York Times stated that the food was "quite good … though it should be characterized as Chinese food for Westerners" and praised the "sweet and sour pork, beef stir‐fried with peppers and onions, chicken soup with egg drops" and "Cantonese staple" crabmeat soup with corn. The decor was described as "a mishmash of Chinese restaurant clichés—panels embossed with dragons, lanterns, woven bamboo, and with rather cramped seating". The waiting service was described as "virtually non-existent".

== In culture ==
In the book Dubious Gastronomy: The Cultural Politics of Eating Asian in the USA Robert Ji-Song Ku wrote that Zevon mentioned Lee Ho Fook in "Werewolves of London" as a nod to the ubiquity of Chinese food in the daily life of British people.

The record producer Joe Boyd recounts that in the summer of 1966, his ritual for entertaining visiting music dignitaries was taking them to dinner at Lee Ho Fook, then walking up Wardour Street to see The Move at the Marquee.

The writer and novelist Will Self wrote in 2002 that he was a fan of Lee Ho Fook because it was mentioned in Zevon's song. The comedian and writer Rich Hall imagined dining at the restaurant as a werewolf in his 2010 short-story collection Magnificent Bastards.
