= Taylor Wane =

British pornographic performer

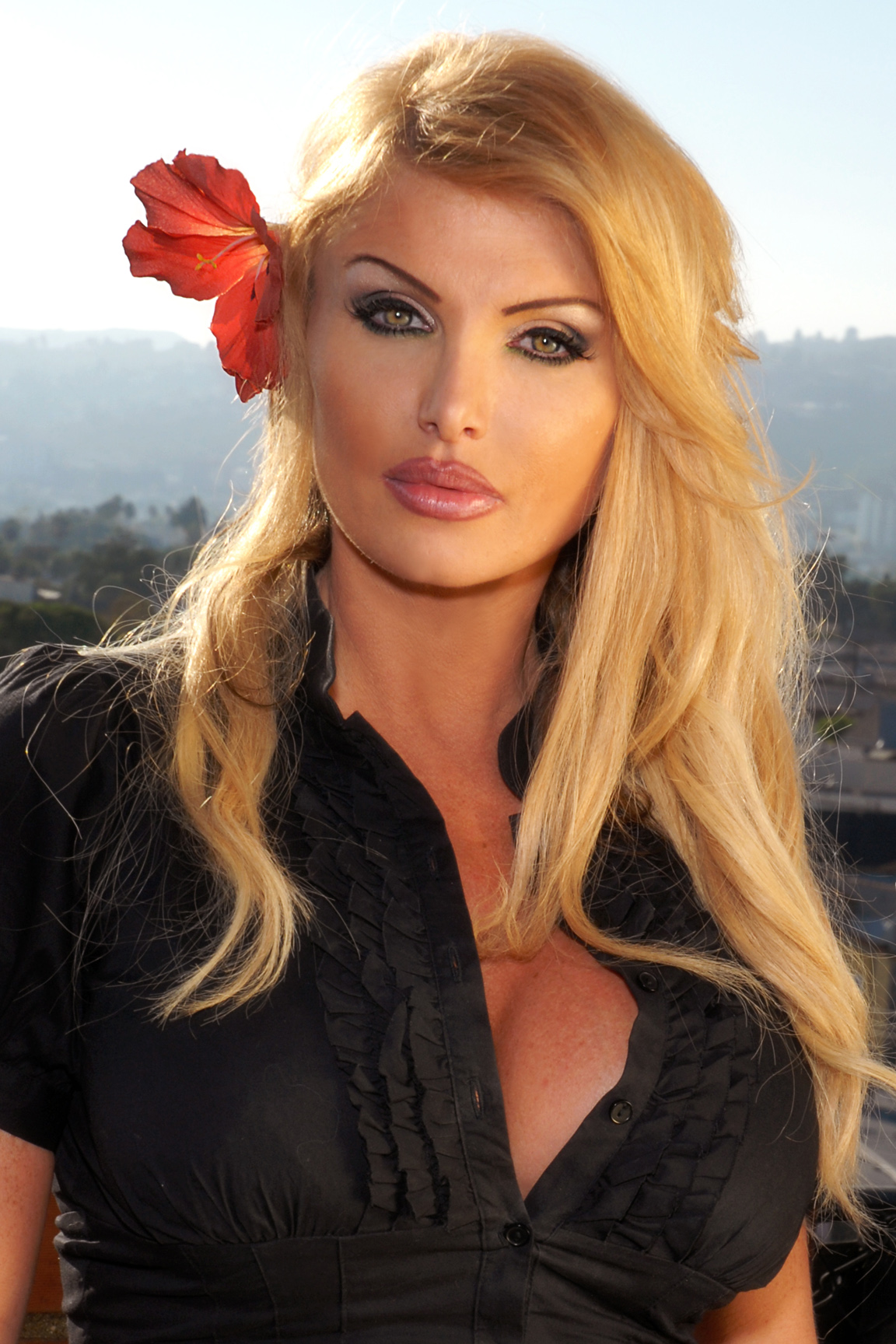
- Wane in 2008
- Born: 1967 or 1968 (age 58–59); Gateshead, Tyne and Wear, England
- Occupations: Actress; model; pornographic film performer; director; model; entrepreneur
- Website: taylorwane.biz

Taylor Wane is a British actress, model, and former pornographic film performer, director, model, and entrepreneur. She was inducted into the AVN Hall of Fame in 2005 and the XRCO Hall of Fame in 2014 as well as Legends Hall of Fame.

== Early life ==
Taylor Wane was born in Gateshead, Tyne and Wear. Attended Breckenbeds Junior High School, Heathfield Senior High School

== Career ==
Wane began performing in the adult video industry in 1989. She appeared several times in Penthouse. In addition to Penthouse, she has been featured in several other publications, including Celebrity Skin, Bizarre Magazine, Gent, and Busty Beauties. In the latter, she had a monthly column as a Celebrity Editor, and she was the November 2005 cover girl and centrefold, in addition to her regular features that included columns such as My Personal Diary, Tits and Bits and sex toy reviews. In 2005, Wane made sixteen appearances in photo spreads in men's magazines, including Genesis, Swank, and Oui. She also became a columnist for AVN Insider magazine that same year with a monthly column entitled Wane's World.

=== Appearances ===
In May 2005, Wane hosted a special event at The Concorde in Hollywood. The event was a private showing of the artist Olivia's original art that featured Wane. Later that year she was a special guest on Playboy Night Calls hosted by Christy Canyon and Tiffany Granath.

Wane has appeared in minor roles in a variety of mainstream television and feature film productions. These appearances include roles in the 1994 children's science fiction series CYBERKIDZ, the 2000 Adam Sandler comedy Little Nicky and episodes in the comedy television series The Mind of the Married Man (HBO, 2002) and Burning Hollywood (2009). Wane has also been seen in episodes of TV shows such as Gene Simmons' Family Jewels, the Fox Reality Channel series My Bare Lady, and FX's Nip/Tuck.

In 2009, Wane was cast in several feature films. In the Ben Affleck, Russell Crowe, and Rachel McAdams political thriller State of Play, Wane was cast as the head mistress of a sex club that was part of a murder investigation. The film is based on a BBC mini-series. In the Ron Howard directed political drama Frost/Nixon, she was cast as a Playboy Playmate in a scene with a Hugh Hefner look-alike. Wane was cast as a dancer in both A Beautiful Life starring Dana Delaney, Bai Ling, and Debi Mazar, and in The Girl From The Naked Eye starring Jason Yee, where she was cast along with fellow adult film actress Sasha Grey.

=== Other ventures ===
Wane has her own production company called Taylor Wane Entertainment started in the mid-1990s. She has also been the host of radio shows on Spice Radio, which is on Sirius XM channel 103, and on KSEX Radio with a weekly night time talk radio show called The British Are Cumming.

In the mid-1990s, Wane co-created an issue of Carnal Comics featuring her autobiography, as well as a fantasy tale later reprinted in a comic called Porn Star Fantasies, making several personal appearances to promote the comic at venues like San Diego Comic-Con. In 2003, Wane launched her own limited edition, X-rated quarterly comic book series in association with H Bomb Comics called Vamptrix. The design of the main character is based on Wane.

Wane and her husband also own and operate several websites, including TaylorWane.com, TaylorWane.net, PlanetPorno.com, and MoBooty.com. They also own an independent photo agency, Laurien Photographic, that licenses photos of Wane and other porn stars to stock agencies and magazines such as Hustler, Gallery, and Jugs.

In 2005, Wane launched her own line of sex toys called the "Taylor Wane Collection". In 2011, she competed on Winter Wipeout on ABC. She failed to advance the qualifier.

== Recognition ==
Wane was honored by a platoon of U.S. Navy SEALs stationed in Iraq in 2007. An American flag was flown for twenty-four hours in honor of Wane as thanks for autographed pictures and correspondence she sent to them. Wane later received the actual flag framed with a Flag Citation. Few others were honored as it is customary for the platoon to vote on a list of people to be honored which typically include family and other service members. The platoon also voted to include actor Kevin Costner and professional golfer Tiger Woods.

== Philanthropy ==
Wane has hosted events to benefit breast cancer awareness as well as to raise funds for cancer, leukemia, and AIDS research for groups such as Breast Cancer Awareness Benefits Everyone (B.A.B.E.) and the T.J. Martell Foundation.

In 2007, after being honored by U.S. Navy SEALs, Wane and her husband created a poster that featured her wearing authentic Navy Seal combat gear. Autographed copies of the poster were sold with the proceeds going to the Disabled American Veterans foundation (DAV). The combat gear was auctioned off as well for an additional donation. Wane stated in 2008, "I support a lot of charities, and DAV is very close to my heart." "I could never be grateful enough or thankful enough for what the servicemen sacrifice for our freedom. They have courage like most of us will never know."

Also in 2008, Wane recorded and contributed a cover version of the holiday favorite "I Saw Mommy Kissing Santa Claus" to the Rock 4 X-Mas charity fundraising album. The album also featured works by Rick Derringer, Spencer Davis, Gary Hoey and Joe Lynn Turner, John Ford, JK Northrup and Michael Vescera, and others.

== Awards ==
- 1992 AVN Award – Best Couples Sex Scene, Film (X Factor - The Next Generation)
- 1994 June Penthouse Pet of the Month
- 2005 AVN Hall of Fame
- 2005 KSEXradio Listener's Choice Award – Funniest Porn Jockey
- 2006 KSEXradio Listener's Choice Award – Best Overall On-Air Personality
- 2006 AdultDVDReviews Critics Choice Award – Best Bust Series (Voluptuous Vixens)
- 2007 Legends of Erotica Hall of Fame
- 2014 XRCO Hall of Fame

== Personal life ==
Wane is a graduate of the Joe Blasco School of Makeup Artistry. She is married.

== See also ==
- List of British pornographic film actors
