= List of pornographic magazines =

This is a list of pornographic magazines (sometimes called erotic magazines or adult magazines) — magazines that contain content of a sexual nature and are typically considered to be pornography.

For inclusion in this list, pornographic magazines must be, or have been, widely available as a printed publication and contain either hardcore or softcore pornographic images.

== Marketed to heterosexual men ==
These magazines may include male-female and/or female-female content.

=== Japan ===
- Beppin – 1984–94, thereafter Bejean 1994 – Eichi Shuppan, Japan, ISSN 0387-1460
- Lemon People (Japan, 1981–1998)
- Manga Burikko (Japan, 1983–1986)
- Urecco – 1986, Million Shuppan, Japan
- Video Boy – 1984, Eichi Shuppan, Japan
- Weekly Playboy – 1966, Shueisha, Japan

=== Netherlands ===
- Chick (Netherlands, 1968–2009)
- Lolita (Netherlands, 1970–1987)
- Seventeen (Netherlands)

=== United Kingdom ===
- Club International (1971; British sister of Club)
- The Cremorne (William Lazenby, 1882)
- Escort (Paul Raymond Publications, UK, 1980–present)
- Fiesta (Galaxy Publications, UK, 1966–2020)
- Mayfair (Paul Raymond Publications, UK)
- Men Only (Paul Raymond Publications, UK
- Knave (Galaxy Publications, UK, 1968–2015)
- The Pearl (William Lazenby, 1879–1880)
- Penthouse (1965–present) and Penthouse Variations
- Photo Bits (1898–1914)
- Razzle (1983; British; focuses on amateur style pornography)
- Whitehouse (1974–2008; David Sullivan, later Gold Star Publishing)
- Playbirds (1976–1999, Sheptonhurst Ltd)
- Lovebirds (1977–1996, Kelerfern Ltd)

=== United States ===
- Adam Film World (1966–1998) and Adam Film World Guide (1981–2008)
- Asian Fever – U.S., launch 1999
- Barely Legal – Hustler Magazine, launch 1974
- Beaver Hunt, launch 1979
- Celebrity Skin (1986–??)
- Chic (1976–2001)
- Club
- Eroticism Magazine Launch 2007
- Erotique Magazine Launch 2023
- Gallery – Montcalm, launch 1972
- Genesis – Magna, launch 1973
- Gent (Magna Publishing Group)
- High Society (1976)
- Hustler (1974–present)
- Juggs, launch 1981
- stallions
- Modern Man (1951–1976)
- Oui (1972–2008)
- Penthouse Forum
- Perfect 10 (print issues 1997–2007)
- Playboy (1953–2020)
- Score (1992; Miami, Florida, focuses on large-breasted women)
- SCREW (Milky Way Productions, 1968)
- Swank

=== Australia ===
- The Picture (Australia, 1988–2019)
- People (Australia, 1950–2019)
- Australasian Post (Australia, 1864–2002)
- Sextra (Australia, 1993–1998)

=== Others ===
- Aktuell Rapport (Norwegian, 1976–present), (Swedish, 1978–2024)
- Color Climax (Danish, 1966)
- Debonair (India, 1973)
- Lui (French, 1964–present)
- Playmen (Italian, 1967–2001)
- Private (1965–present) (Swedish, Spanish)
- Lung Fu Pao (Hong Kong, 1984–2022)
- Mondette Duet – Published by Wyngate & Bevins California 1970

== Lads' mags ==
- Nuts (UK 2004–2014)
- Zoo Weekly (UK 2004–2015, Australia 2006–2015, South Africa 2006–2008)

== Marketed to gay and bisexual men ==
Gay pornography includes magazines, sometimes known as adult magazines or gay sex magazines, that contain content of a sexual nature, typically regarded as pornography, that relates to men having sex with men.

These magazines are targeted at gay and bisexual men, although they may also have some female readers, and may include male-male and occasionally male-male-female content and/or male-female content. Such publications include photographs or other illustrations of nudity and sexual activities, including oral sex, anal sex, and other forms of sexual activity. These magazines primarily serve to stimulate sexual thoughts and emotions. Some magazines are very general in their variety of illustrations, while others may be more specific and focus on particular activities or fetishes.

Prior to the 1970s, gay pornography was not widely distributed due to censorship laws. Non-pornographic "beefcake magazines" were widely available, and were generally purchased by gay men. From the late 1980s, a number of gay magazines and newspapers featured homoerotic nude or partially clothed male models but were not classified as pornography, for example Gay Times and QX Magazine. These have not been included here. See List of LGBT periodicals.

The following is a list of gay pornographic magazines, with country of publication and approximate period of publication, where available:

=== Brazil ===
- G Magazine (Brazil, 1998–2014) (OCLC 45184945)

=== Germany ===
- Männer Aktuell (Germany, 1987–2017)

=== United Kingdom ===
- Vulcan (UK), made famous in a High Court test case by serial killer Dennis Nilsen (out of print), Edited by David Weston until Nigel Hatton took over in the mid 80's, published by Millivres Ltd, originally based in Camden Town, London (and the original producers of Gay Times Magazine – formerly known as Gay Reporter).
- Zipper (UK), Edited by Alex McKenna and Nigel Hatton, published by Millivres Ltd.
- Overload (UK), Edited by Nigel Hatton, published by Millivres Ltd.
- Him (UK), published by Millivres Ltd.

=== United States ===
- Black Inches (Mavety Media Group, U.S., 1996–2009), focused on African-American men
- Blueboy (Global Media Group, U.S.: 1975 – 3 issues; July/August 1975–August/September 1977 – bimonthly; November 1977 – 2007 – monthly)
- Bound & Gagged (U.S., 1987–2005)
- Drum (U.S., 1964–1967), December 1965 issue was the first U.S. magazine to show male frontal nudity
- Freshmen (U.S., 1982–2009)
- Honcho (U.S., April 1978 – November 2009)
- Mandate (Mavety Media Group, U.S., monthly April 1975 – October 2009)
- Manshots (U.S. film pornography magazine 1988–2001)
- Men (Specialty Media, U.S., monthly, October 1997 – November 2009), began as Advocate Men in June 1984
- Pinups Magazine (U.S.)
- Playguy (U.S., October 1976 – October 2009)

=== Japan ===
- Badi (Japan, 1994–2019)
- Barazoku (Japan, 1971–2008)
- G-men (Japan, 1995–2016)
- Samson (Japan, 1982)

== Marketed to heterosexual women ==
- Filament (United Kingdom, 2009–2011)
- Playgirl, ISSN 0273-6918 (United States, 1973–2016)
- Viva (United States, 1973–1980)

== Marketed to lesbian women ==
- On Our Backs (United States, 1984–2006)
- Quim (United Kingdom, 1989–2001)

== Marketed to heterosexual and LGBT men and women ==
- Suck (UK, 1969)

== See also ==
- List of fetish magazines
- List of performers in gay porn films
- List of pornographic movie studios
- Category:Pin-up magazines
