= Club (magazine) =

American pornographic magazine

- Cover of December 1976 issue
- Categories: Pornographic
- Frequency: Monthly
- Company: Magna Publishing Group
- Country: US
- Language: English
- Website: www.clubmagazine.com
- ISSN: 0747-0827

Club is a monthly American pornographic magazine which is a spin-off of Club International, published in the U.K. Club features sexually oriented articles, video reviews, and pictorials that include hardcore pornography, masturbation, dildo usage, and lesbian sex.

== History ==
During the early and mid 1990s the magazine featured softcore and simulated sex pictorials and had at least two contract models that appeared monthly (Charmaine Sinclair and Jo Guest). Club and its UK sister publication, Club International, are the flagship publications for Paul Raymond Publications which distributes eight of the ten top selling adult magazines in the UK.

== Management ==
When Paragon Publishing, the U.S. franchisee of Club, filed for bankruptcy the publishing was taken over by Paul Raymond Publications. In August 2009, Magna Publishing Group purchased Club magazine and its sister publications from Club Media Inc., increasing the total number of titles it publishes to over sixty. The deal also included sister publications Club International, Club Confidential, and Best of Club. Magna Publishing Group also produces such established men's magazine titles such as Swank, Genesis, Fox, Gallery, Velvet, and Gent. In December 2015 Magna Publishing Group was purchased by 1-800-PHONESEX.
