= Undesirable Publications Act =

Statute of the Parliament of Singapore

Undesirable Publications Act 1967
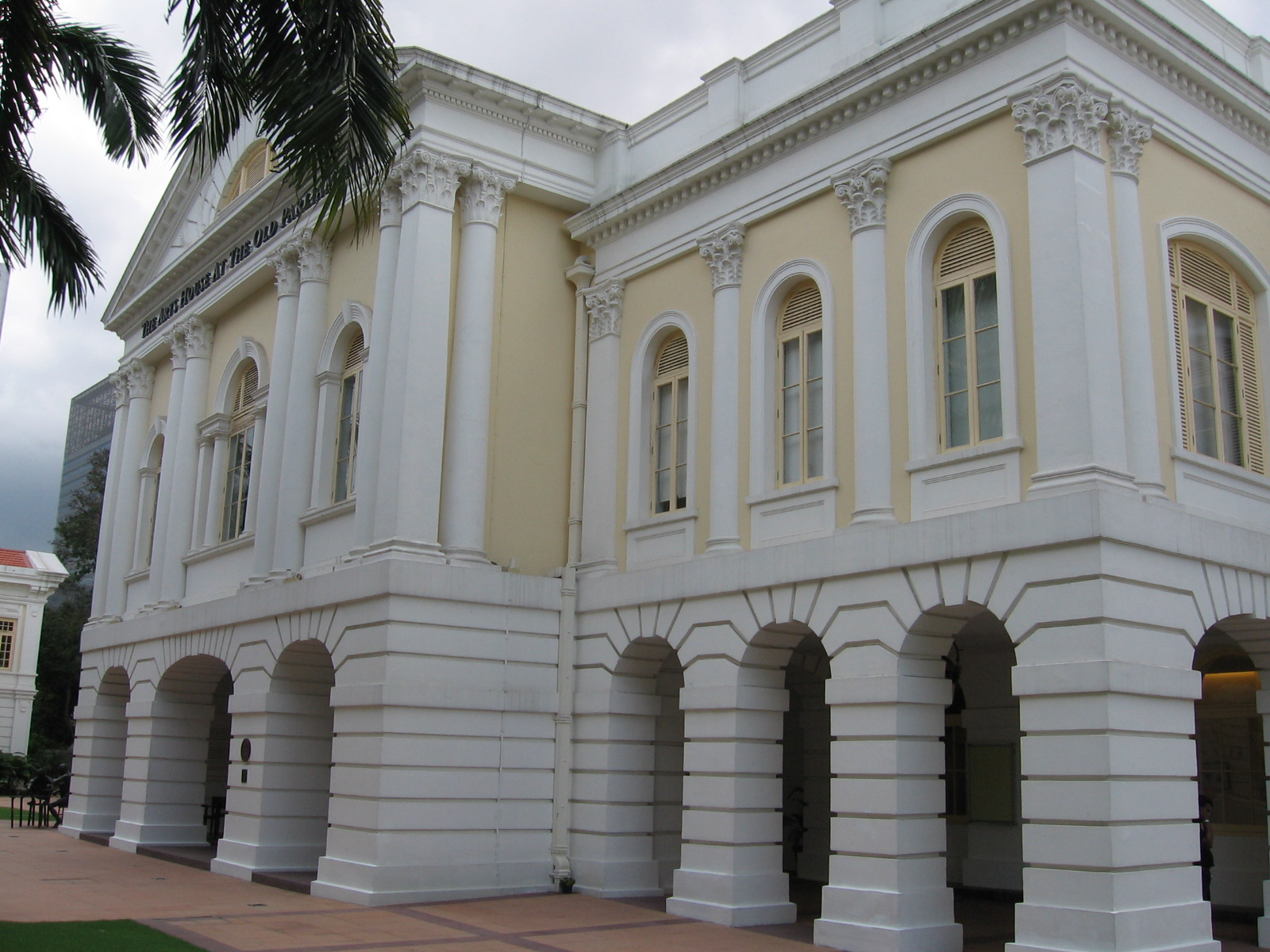
- Old Parliament House, photographed in January 2006

Parliament of Singapore
- Long title: An Act to prevent the importation, distribution or reproduction of undesirable publications and for purposes connected therewith.
- Citation: Act 3 of 1967
- Enacted by: Parliament of Singapore
- Enacted: 1967
- Status: In force

The Undesirable Publications Act 1967 (UPA) is a Singapore statute which, according to its long title, prevents the importation, distribution, or reproduction of undesirable publications and for purposes associated in doing so. The Act, which was passed in 1967 empowers the Government of Singapore in incriminating and punishing both individuals and corporates that are involved in the sale, supply, exhibition, or distribution of obscene and objectionable publications.

== Overview ==
The UPA regulates the importation, distribution or reproduction of undesirable publications. Together with the Penal Code, Films Act and the Children and Young Persons Act, the UPA law also seeks to protect all persons, including children, from being exploited for pornography especially child pornography. Under the UPA, it may be a punishable offence to make, sell or distribute objectionable publications, including calendars.

Other than pornography, publication that may also fall under the jurisdiction of the UPA include those that offend racial and religious groups. If a work concerns any race or religion in a certain manner such that feelings of enmity, hatred, or hostility were to be aroused, this very publication may be deemed objectionable as well.

Anti-colonial and Communist material were once banned by the UPA, but the ban has since been lifted after a review by the Media Development Authority (MDA). Review of gazetted publications are conducted in consultation with the Publications Consultative Panel, whereas 17 publications, mostly pornographic that still remain officially prohibited in Singapore may include:

1. All publications by Watch Tower Bible and Tract Society
2. All publications by International Bible Students Association
3. Playboy
4. Swank
5. Girls of Penthouse
6. Gallery
7. Elite
8. Penthouse
9. Men Only
10. Genesis
11. Playgirl
12. Velvet
13. Mayfair
14. Fiesta
15. Hustler
16. Knave
17. Cheri

A grey area of this law may be that of taking and keeping photos of oneself having sex. Taking photographs or videos of oneself having sex or of others without taking payment is not against the law, however, dissemination of such materials is an infringement of the UPA.

== Uses of the Act ==
Janet Jackson's 2001 album All for You was banned under the UPA over sexually explicit lyrics in one of the songs "Would You Mind".

In 2004, Steve Chia of the National Solidarity Party was let off with a warning after being found in possession of an obscene film.

In 2008, Ong Kian Cheong and Dorothy Chan Hien Leng were charged under both the Sedition Act and Undesirable Publications Act for allegedly distributing evangelistic publication titled The Little Bride that cast Prophet Muhammad in negative light.

In 2015, the government lifted the ban of 240 publications, including the 18th century erotic novel Fanny Hill or anti-colonial books.

Taking part in an outdoor nude photo shoot may trigger the Miscellaneous Offences (Public Order and Nuisance) Act instead of the UPA, as in the case of two tourists taking nude photographs at Sentosa in 2016.

In 2017, Singapore banned nine books from a Singaporean preacher.

In 2021, Cherian George's book, Red Lines: Political Cartoons and the Struggle against Censorship, was banned for reproducing materials that are offensive to religious feelings.
