= Magna Publishing Group =

American publishing company

Coordinates: 40.9151750°N 074.0547000°W

Magna Publishing Group, Inc.
- Company type: Private
- Industry: Publishing, Sex industry
- Founded: 1975
- Headquarters: 210 East State Route 4 Suite 211 Paramus, New Jersey 07652-5103, United States
- Area served: Worldwide
- Products: Pornographic magazines, magazines

Magna Publishing Group, Inc. is an American publishing company headquartered in Paramus, New Jersey. Founded in 1975, the company publishes a number of magazine titles and is one of the largest publishers of pornographic magazines in the United States with titles such as Club, Swank, Genesis, Gallery, Gent, as well as "nearly 60 total adult titles". The company has only 1 to 10 employees. On December 22, 2015, Magna Publishing Group was purchased by 1-800-PHONESEX for an undisclosed amount.

== Adult magazines ==
- 200 Uncensored Sex Acts
- 300 Uncensored Sex Acts
- 500 Uncensored Sex Acts
- Best of Club
- Best of Genesis
- Best of Genesis: Red Hot Amateurs
- Black Diamonds
- Black Lust
- Buf
- Burning Angel
- Butt Lust
- Celebrity Skin
- Cheeks
- Cheri
- Cherry Pop
- Cherry Pie
- Cleavage Magazine
- Club
- Club International
- Club Confidential
- D-Cup
- Finally Legal
- Fox
- Fox XXXtreme
- Friends & Lovers
- Gallery
- Genesis
- Genesis Presents Eager Beavers
- Genesis Presents: Ripe
- Gent
- Gent Big Boobs
- Gent Monster Tits
- Girls of the Orient
- Girls Over 40
- Girls/Girls XXX Video
- Hawk
- Hawk Presents
- High Society
- Hometown Girls
- Hot Asians
- Hot 'n Older
- Just 18
- Leg Action
- Leg Love
- Leg World
- Legal & Tender
- Lesbian Licks
- Lesbian Lust
- Lollypops
- Nugget
- Petite
- Playgirl
- Plumpers
- Purely 18
- Red Hot Amateurs
- Sex Acts
- Stag
- Swank
- Swank's Anal Action
- Swank's Big Boobs
- Swank Extreme
- Swank's Innocence
- Swank's Lesbian Licks
- Swank's Lesbian Lust
- Swank's Open Legs & Lace
- Swank Pleasure: Uncensored Sex
- Swank's Shaved Sex Action
- Swank's Uncensored
- Swank's Uncensored Sex
- Swank's X-tasy
- Sweet 18
- Ultra for Men
- Uncensored Sex
- Uncensored Sex Scenes
- Velvet
- Video World
- Vivid SuperXXXHeroes Magazine

Titles published under the name "Enoble Media Group":

- Black Men
- Braids and Beauty
- Carblite
- Cosplay Culture
- Digital Camera
- Faces
- Handheld Computing
- Hit Parader
- Hype Hair
- Michael Jackson Tribute
- Popstar!
- Rebel Ink
- Right On!
- Skin & Ink
- Skinz
- SSX
- Tattoo
- Teen Dream
- Today's Black Woman
- Urban Ink
- Word Up!
