= Mandate (magazine) =

American gay pornographic magazine

- March 2005 issue cover of Mandate
- Categories: Gay pornographic
- Frequency: Monthly
- Circulation: 100,000 (1980s)
- Founded: 1975
- Final issue: 2009
- Company: Mavety Media Group
- Country: United States
- Language: English
- Website: mandate.com (archived in 2009)
- ISSN: 0360-1005

Mandate was a monthly pornographic magazine for gay men, established in March 1975 by publisher George W. Mavety. Serving as the flagship title of the Mavety Media Group, the magazine was a cornerstone of the gay adult press, and one of the few nationally distributed publications featuring full-frontal male nudity. During its peak in the late 1970s and 1980s, the publication achieved a national circulation of over 100,000 copies, making it one of the most widely available gay publications. It was a profitable model that paved the way for later Mavety titles like Playguy (1976) and Honcho (1978).

The publication primarily features photography of nude men, erotic fiction, and various articles covering lifestyle and entertainment topics. Its editorial coverage of social and political issues was analysed by scholars. Mandate, however, faced advertising challenges, as mainstream companies were often reluctant to place ads in gay-oriented adult media. Struggling during the digital age, the magazine ceased publication in 2009, along with Mavety's other gay titles.

== History ==
=== 1970s ===
Originally from Newboro, Ontario, George W. Mavety spent three years teaching on Wolfe Island before entering the publishing world. His timing coincided with the post-Stonewall era, where legal victories surrounding male nude photography helped establish the gay community as a viable economic market. When male full-frontal nudity became legal, Mavety expected a high-quality gay adult magazine to emerge that mirrored the style and prestige of Playboy, but that never appeared. In 1974, Mavety founded Modernismo Publications and acted as the distributor for Dilettante, an art magazine aimed at being the "gay Playboy". Working with editor John Devere, Mavety saw the title fold after just four issues in March 1975 due to poor sales and advertising.

As a distributor for Colt, Mavety recognized that incorporating explicit nudity was the natural progression for gay magazines. With Devere heavily in debt, Mavety took control of the operation and launched Mandate as a replacement, retaining Devere as an employee rather than a partner. Devere set up a shop to distribute the magazine on 10th Street in Manhattan, next to the Julius' gay bar. Premiered in April 1975, Mandate gradually stood as one of the few nationally distributed publications featuring full frontal male nudity, joining the ranks of Blueboy and InTouch. Its premiere cover featured model Bill Cable, photographed by Jim French. The magazine issued its first color cover in August 1976. Four months later, musician and actor Kris Kristofferson was featured on the cover in December 1976, with a special color preview of his film A Star Is Born.

=== 1980s–2000s ===
Like many adult publications, Mandate faced significant challenges in securing reputable national advertisers, as these companies often characterized the magazine's content as "pornographic". Most of the advertising in Mandate came from underwear brands, mail-order jewelry and clothing, and gay-oriented establishments like restaurants, discotheques, and hotels. In late 1983, members of the Russian River Gay Business Association were shocked to find their businesses featured in unsolicited, free advertisements within Mandate. Many business owners would have declined the promotion had they known their names would appear alongside explicit adult content, such as full-page photographs of naked men.

As the 1980s progressed, the content of Mandate shifted in response to the HIV/AIDS epidemic. Despite his initial reluctance to address the crisis, Mavety finally used Mandate to explicitly discuss the AIDS epidemic in February 1987. In a rare publisher's letter, he acknowledged his duty to highlight the urgency of the situation, and urged readers to support eight emerging organizations, such as the Gay Men's Health Crisis. In 1986, writer David B. Feinberg submitted a story to Mandate, leading to a monthly column titled "Tales From Hell's Kitchenette". These comic vignettes about gay life in New York ran from July 1986 to May 1987. Viking Press editor Ed Iwanicki, who was an enthusiastic fan of the column, encouraged him to submit a novel manuscript. The novel Eighty-Sixed was published in 1989.

The rise of the home video market and widespread internet pornography led to declining sales for the Mavety Media Group as it faced fierce competition from rivals like Men. Despite these financial struggles, Mavety adamantly refused to close his gay publications. "Gay titles are what I started with, the gay models are what made my fortune, and I will never let them go," he said. Mavety passed away from a heart attack on August 19, 2000. The company's leadership transitioned to Dian Hanson, Tanya Wood, and Virginia Chua. Almost a decade later, Mandate ceased its publications on 11 May 2009, alongside all other gay magazines owned by Mavety Media Group. Publications like Xtra, Queerty, and Unzipped cited Mavety's neglect to adapt to the digital landscape as the primary reason for the company's downfall. Advocate Men publisher John Knoebel observes that he failed to build a loyal fanbase to sustain the business long-term.

== Content ==
Mandate's aesthetics leaned into hairy men and popular porn actors. Mandate was designed as a multifaceted monthly magazine blending erotica, news, and entertainment for gay men. The photography in Mandate adhered to strict regulations, while the text could be hardcore. The most significant restriction among these rules was the absolute prohibition of sexual penetration. To offset the magazine's explicit content, nonsexual material remained prominent in every issue. While it featured male nudes and erotic fiction, the publication also included reviews of books, films, and music, alongside reporting on the social, political, and cultural milestones of the gay liberation movement. It notably covered significant cultural and political flashpoints, such as Anita Bryant's anti-gay rights activism and the controversy surrounding William Friedkin's 1980 film Cruising.

Art director Andrew Bass likened the magazine to Esquire, envisioning a blend of lifestyle content and imagery of model-like men. Hanson described the magazine as "elegant". Daniel Harris, writing for The Antioch Review (1996), noted the magazine's "naughty humor" approach. The writer also opined that Mandate utilized an editorial strategy by juxtaposing explicit erotic imagery with serious journalism, such as scholarly reviews of ballet and classical theater. He noticed such an approach was used as a "disguise for erotica"—a tradition dating back to mid-century physique magazines that used classical Greek motifs to mask homoerotic content. In Cloning fashion: Uniform gay images in male apparel (2017), author Steven Stine claimed that Mandate was among the first gay press to provide widespread coverage of the AIDS epidemic in its articles. Archivist Richard Hulser of the ONE National Gay & Lesbian Archives emphasized that the serious journalism within Mandate holds significant historical value. Much like Playboy, the magazine offered content that allowed readers to look beyond the erotic imagery.

== Reception ==
As the flagship publication for Mavety, Mandate served as a profitable model that paved the way for later titles like Playguy (1976) and Honcho (1978). While Mandate was not formally audited by the Audit Bureau of Circulations, Mavety reported that the debut issue launched with a press run of 10,000 copies. By the 16th issue in 1976, 59,000 copies were printed. In a 1977 interview with The Miami Herald, Devere claimed the magazine's circulation was at 75,000 copies. The magazine had a circulation of over 100,000 by the 1980s, matching Mavety's original predictions for its market potential. Karen Mason, owner of the Circus of Books adult bookstores, noted that Mandate sold hundreds of copies. She recalled, "We would get six hundred copies, and we sold almost all of them." According to Hanson, Mavety printed 250,000 copies of Mandate during its early years, though circulation sharply declined to 40,000 copies by 1991.

Mandate was recognized as one of the leading gay publications in the US in the 1970s and early 1980s. Hanson commented that Mavety created Mandate "for a gay audience because no one else had the balls to do it". Matthew Rettenmund commented that by August 1976, when its first color cover appeared, the magazine felt like "more like a smart skin mag" than like "a clone of the closety entertainment title After Dark". "It turned gay men on and allowed them to feel seen—literally", he wrote. He found the debut of Mandate groundbreaking for pushing a gay-oriented magazine featuring nudity into the same spaces as mainstream titles, moving beyond the niche markets where magazines like Blueboy were typically found. Writer Stan Leventhal emphasized the magazine's accessibility to many isolated young men in the gay community, while The Advocate was often missing from small-town shelves.

== See also ==
- List of gay pornographic magazines
