= Roy Stuart (photographer) =

American photographer and film director

Roy Stuart is an American photographer and film director who lives in Paris. His photographs blend glamour photography and contemporary art with an emphasis on female models and BDSM aesthetics. His photography books have been published by Taschen and has directed the movies Giulia and The Lost Door.

== Life and work ==
Stuart lived in New York in the late 1970s and early 1980s, working as an actor ("his only role of interest was a bit part in The Godfather Part II, playing an American soldier back from World War II"), musician and in a colour photo lab.

He moved to London where he became a photographer and began taking erotic photographs. His work blends glamour photography and contemporary art with an emphasis on female models and BDSM aesthetics. His first three volumes of photography sold 250,000 copies. He later moved to Paris.

Philippe Garnier, writing in Libération in 2002 said of Stuart's publications by Taschen, "Roy Stuart is quickly becoming a locomotive for this atypical editor." (Note: The original in French is "Roy Stuart est bien vite devenu une locomotive pour cet éditeur atypique")

== Publications ==
- Roy Stuart, vol. 1. Cologne: Taschen, 1998. ISBN 3-8228-2912-9.
- Roy Stuart, vol. 2. Cologne: Taschen, 1999. ISBN 3-8228-2929-3.
- Roy Stuart, vol. 3. Cologne: Taschen, 2000. ISBN 3-8228-3584-6.
- 30 Postcards. Postcard Book Series. Cologne: Taschen, 2000. ISBN 9783822860847.
- Roy Stuart: The Fourth Body. Cologne: Taschen, 2004. ISBN 3-8228-2557-3.
- Roy Stuart, vol. 5. Cologne: Taschen, 2007. ISBN 978-3-8228-4501-1.
- Leg show work, 1995–2001. Cologne: Taschen, 2009. ISBN 9783822839348.
- Glympstorys. Skylight; Mul, 2014. ISBN 9783037666517. Includes Julia on DVD.
- Lovers and Madmen. Skylight; Mul, 2016. ISBN 978-3-03766-664-7.
- Power Play: the Leg Show Photos. Roy Stuart: Embrace Your Fantasies. With original Leg Show magazine text by Dian Hanson.
- Getting Off: the Leg Show Photos. Roy Stuart: Embrace Your Fantasies. With original Leg Show magazine text by Hanson.

== Films ==
- Tinto Brass Presents Erotic Short Stories: Part 1 – Julia (1999). Directed by Stuart, Francesco Dominedò and Stefano Soli. Produced / sponsored by Tinto Brass and produced by Giuseppe Colombo. 108 min.
- Giulia (1999). Directed by Stuart. Written by Stuart and Joseph Simas. Produced by Giuseppe Colombo. 85 min.
- The Lost Door (2008). Directed by Stuart. Written by Stuart and Rémi Bohrt. Additional music by Gary Lucas.
