= Mavety Media Group =

American defunct media organization

- Type: Private company
- Industry: Publishing
- Founded: 1974; 52 years ago
- Founder: George W. Mavety
- Defunct: 2009; 17 years ago (gay titles)
- Headquarters: New York, US
- Website: mmgmagazines.com (archived in 2012)

Mavety Media Group was an American publishing corporation that specialized in pornographic magazines, adult-oriented entertainment and lifestyle periodicals. Established in 1974 by George W. Mavety under the original name Modernismo Publications, the company grew into a significant media corporation catering to both gay and straight audiences. It was best known for the diverse portfolio of titles, including prominent magazines such as Mandate, Inches, Honcho, Juggs, and Leg Show. Following the death of Mavety in 2000, the company continued operations for another decade before eventually ceasing its gay-oriented print publications in 2009.

== History ==
Born in Newboro, Ontario, George W. Mavety was a teacher in Wolfe Island for three years before pursuing a career in publishing. Following the Stonewall revolution and landmark legal victories regarding male nude photography, the gay community was increasingly recognized as a potent financial force. In 1974, Mavety founded Modernismo Publications and became the distributor for Dilettante, a short-lived publication intended to be a "gay Playboy". He worked with editor John Devere. After only four issues, the magazine folded in March 1975 due to soft sales and declining advertising revenues. With Devere heavily in debt, Mavety proposed replacing the title with Mandate. He hired Devere to remain as editor, but this time as an employee. Premiered in April 1975, Mandate was established as a mix of gay erotica, news, and entertainment. By the late 1970s, the Mavety titles claimed a circulation of 100,000, earning a reputation as the most influential gay men's magazines in the US.

Building on the success of Mandate, Mavety expanded his venture with titles like Playguy (1976) and Honcho (1978), each featuring a distinct aesthetic. These titles followed a commercial formula: a muscular model on the cover, accompanied by cheeky, candy-colored headlines. Writers Perry Brass and Matthew Rettenmund recognized Mavety as a trailblazer for his hiring a predominantly gay staff to create content specifically for a gay audience, a rarity in mainstream publishing at the time. By the 1990s, Mavety Media had matured into a corporate entity operating out of a sedate office in Cranford, New Jersey. To offset the magazines' explicit content, nonsexual material remains prominent in every issue. This strategy integrated serious journalism, gay political commentary, and Q&A sessions with celebrities. The brand also published hetero titles like Juggs (1981) and Leg Show (1980), which were edited by Dian Hanson.

George W. Mavety founded the company in 1974 with the premiere of Dilettante.

It was not until February 1987 that Mavety explicitly addressed the AIDS epidemic in Mandate, where he urged readers to support eight emerging organizations, including the Gay Men's Health Crisis. As the home video market grew and internet pornography became widely accessible, Mavety Media Group faced declining sales and intense competition from rival titles like Men. Despite the decline in sales, Mavety adamantly refused to shut down his gay publications, declaring: "Gay titles are what I started with, the gay models are what made my fortune, and I will never let them go." Mavety passed away from a heart attack on August 19, 2000. At the time of his death, Mavety owned over 50 companies, primarily within the publishing field. The company's leadership transitioned to Dian Hanson, Tanya Wood, and Virginia Chua. However, Chua was eventually fired, and Hanson later resigned. Nearly a decade after Mavety's death, on May 11, 2009, it was officially announced that Mavety Media Group had withdrawn from the gay publishing sector. JC Adams opined that the simultaneous closure of so many titles "would devastate the gay-adult magazine category".

In retrospect, Mavety's titles are widely regarded as the most successful gay publications of the 1970s and 1980s. LGBT historian Michael Bronski argued that these magazines served as the foundation for a visible gay male culture across the US. Gay adult director Joe Gage hailed Mavety as a pioneer for his approach to publishing gay titles, while mainstream titles like Playboy were "unbelievably snotty and condescending" toward the industry. Gage also emphasized that Mavety was the first to recognize both the profitability and viability of gay material on a massive scale. Despite Mavety's market dominance, Advocate Men publisher John Knoebel observes that he failed to build a loyal fanbase to sustain the business long-term. The writers of Unzipped found the Mavety Media Group left an imprint on gay male culture: they created a gay male "look", fueled fantasies, and reached out to gay men across the country.

== Notable titles ==
Black Inches magazine cover, June 2006 issue

Playguy magazine cover, March 1985 issue

- Dilettante (1974–1975): a mainstream arts magazine intended to be a gay version of Playboy.
- Mandate (1975–2009): distinguished by its "clean-cut" models and high-quality lifestyle articles. It was one of the first gay-interest magazines featuring nudity to achieve national distribution. It reached circulation of 200,000 by 2005.
- Playguy (1976–2009): specifically targeted an audience of muscular gay men under the age of 25. It was designed to mirror the aesthetic of Playboy and Penthouse. The magazine's editor, Jim Eigo, described it as "Tiger Beat with a boner". The magazine built a strong fanbase, reaching circulation of 110,000 by 2005.
- Honcho (1978–2009): was tailored for the leather and gay bear community. Production artist Steve Perkins suggested the title. Compared to Mandate, Honcho prioritized more explicit material, specifically targeting an audience primarily interested in erotica. Under Doug McClemont, the second-to-last editor-in-chief for the Mavety portfolio, Honcho experienced a significant decline in sales. It reached circulation of 100,000 by 2005.
- Leg Show (1980–2012): a leg and foot fetish magazine. After transitioning from a bimonthly to a monthly publication schedule, its circulation skyrocketed from 75,000 to 250,000 in 1996.
- Juggs (1981–2025): specializes in photographs of women with large breasts. By 1996, the magazine reached a circulation of 150,000.
- Torso (1982–2009): focused on the muscular male physique. One of Mavety's main titles, it was originally published by Blueboy's Donald Embinder in California. The magazine featured a "splashy" aesthetic and a bold masthead; American porn star Al Parker graced the premiere cover.
- Stallion (1982–1993): a multifaceted title that combined coverage of popular culture and film reviews with gay male pornography. The magazine was originally conceptualized by American director Jerry Douglas several years before its eventual sale to Mavety in 1987.
- Inches (1985–2009): focused on well-endowed men. It launched two specialized spin-offs dedicated to racialized men: Black Inches (1993–2009) and Latin Inches (1997–2009). Black Inches was referenced in several novels, including D. J. Murphy's Sons Like Me, John Weir's What I Did Wrong, and Jim Norton's Happy Ending. Porn actor Bobby Blake writes of his relationship with the magazine, "Black Inches was always very supportive of me. They reviewed every film I made, did photo-shoots, interviewed me, and gave me my own column."
- Black Tail (1990–2012): featuring photography of African-American women.
- Bust Out! (1996–2002): a specialized title focusing on surgically augmented strippers. By its launch year in 1996, the magazine had already achieved a circulation of 80,000.
- Popstar! (1998–2000): a teen magazine published by Mavety and Rettenmund, intended for teenyboppers. It was later sold to Robert Earl of Planet Hollywood. Rettenmund found it challenging to manage Popstar! among other Mavety's adult titles. The magazine had an audited circulation of 217,183 per issue in 2006.

== See also ==
- List of pornographic magazines
