= Getting Even (short story) =

- Short story by Isaac Asimov
- Country: United States
- Language: English
- Genre: Fantasy

Publication
- Published in: Gallery
- Publication type: Periodical
- Publisher: Davis Publications
- Media type: Print (magazine)
- Publication date: August 1980

Chronology
- Series: Union Club; Azazel
—	No Refuge Could Save (Union Club); One Night of Song (Azazel)

"Getting Even" is a fantasy short story by American writer Isaac Asimov. It is the first story in his series of Union Club mysteries, and also the first in his Azazel fantasy series. It first appeared in the August 1980 issue of Gallery.

According to Asimov, this story was omitted from both of his anthologies The Union Club Mysteries (Doubleday: 1983) and Azazel (Doubleday: 1988) because it did not match the later stories in either series. It is the only Azazel story not to appear in any of Asimov's own books, although there are 21 other Union Club stories which have never been collected.

"Getting Even" was reprinted in Tales from the Spaceport Bar (Avon Books: 1987), an anthology of stories by different authors.

== Plot synopsis ==
As with all the subsequent Union Club stories, the story is related by a man called Griswold to other club members in the club bar.

Some time ago, Griswold sold an unspecified idea or invention to a wealthy man called Felix Hammock, who made a profit of ten million dollars from Griswold's idea but only paid him ten thousand dollars and no royalties. Griswold felt aggrieved by this, but failed to obtain legal redress against Hammock or to persuade him to voluntarily pay more.

Griswold decided to get even with Hammock by summoning a tiny supernatural creature from another universe and enlisting its aid. The creature, which is not named in this story, is described as being two centimetres tall, with no tail or horns, and "not red exactly, or black. Rather lavender, I should say." It offered to help Griswold steal something of value from Hammock, without actually injuring him. Although it was capable of stealing anything Griswold could think of, it had only limited powers and so could only steal no more than about two grams of matter. Therefore, the puzzle Griswold had to solve was how to steal something valuable to Hammock which would not exceed that mass. Griswold then invites his listeners to try to work out what he did. (Asterisks then appear in the text so that the reader may also attempt to do so before continuing.)

When the other club members fail to solve the problem, Griswold describes his solution. He had the creature steal particular flakes of paint from Hammock's collection of original Picasso paintings – specifically, he stole Picasso's signature from each painting, reducing the value of Hammock's art collection by at least ten million dollars. He then visited Hammock at home in order to witness his anguish at the moment of discovering his loss.
