= No Refuge Could Save =

Short story by Isaac Asimov

- Short story by Isaac Asimov
- Country: United States
- Language: English
- Genre: Mystery short story

Publication
- Published in: Gallery
- Publication type: Periodical
- Publisher: Davis Publications
- Media type: Print (magazine)
- Publication date: September 1980

Chronology
- Series: Union Club
Getting Even	The Telephone Number

"No Refuge Could Save" is a short story by Isaac Asimov. It is the second of Asimov's Union Club mystery stories, and the first to be anthologised in The Union Club Mysteries. Overall these mysteries are not rated highly, but this is considered to be one of the best in the series. It first appeared in the September 1980 issue of Gallery under the title "To Spot A Spy".

== Plot ==
The central character, Griswold, explains that during World War II, he was involved in US intelligence. While questioning a suspected German spy, he performed a word association test on him. When Griswold said "terror of flight", the suspect replied, "gloom of the grave". This was evidence that he was a spy who had been trained up in Americanisms, since the two phrases allude to a line in the third verse of "The Star-Spangled Banner" and no native-born American could possibly be familiar with the third verse of the national anthem ("except for me, and I know everything," added Griswold). Most Americans only know the first verse because it is the only one of the anthem's four verses that is normally sung.

This is a tongue-in-cheek parody of stories where an enemy agent is caught by his lack of knowledge. However, Griswold does make the serious point that the third verse of the US national anthem is particularly war-mongering, and so was especially forgotten in the "great peace-loving years of 1941 to 1945". In truth, the third verse was often omitted during those times by the few who knew it because of the alliance with Great Britain, which was the enemy in the War of 1812 and thus the object of scorn in the third verse.

== See also ==
- Francis Scott Key
- Shibboleth
- Scheveningen
