= Who's Nailin' Paylin? =

- Adventures of a Hockey MILF
- Directed by: Jerome Tanner
- Written by: Roger Krypton
- Produced by: Larry Flynt
- Starring: Lisa Ann
- Cinematography: Jake Tanner
- Distributed by: Hustler Video
- Release date: 2008
- Running time: 105 minutes
- Language: English

Who's Nailin' Paylin? is a 2008 American satirical pornographic film directed by Jerome Tanner and starring Lisa Ann. It satirizes former U.S. vice-presidential candidate Sarah Palin. Besides being a parody of Sarah Palin, the film includes spoofs of Hillary Clinton, Condoleezza Rice, Todd Palin, and Bill O'Reilly.

Produced by Hustler Video, the film was shot in two days and includes five hardcore sex scenes spanning from the Paylin character's college years, home life in rural Alaska, and the 2008 U.S. presidential election.

On October 31, 2008, Hustler announced that Lisa Ann was going to star in "Obama is Nailin' Palin?" a scene that continued on the adventures of Lisa as Sarah Palin except this time Barack Obama would be lampooned as well. The scene is only available through their Hustler members' website with no plans to release it on a DVD. This "bonus scene" was released on election eve November 3, 2008.

Hustler produced several sequels to Who's Nailin' Paylin? with Lisa Ann reprising her role, although they all used the real spelling of Palin's name—Letterman's Nailin Palin, You're Nailin' Palin (an interactive point-of-view DVD with Alexis Texas as Miss California USA Carrie Prejean), Hollywood's Nailin Palin and Who's Nailin Palin 2.

== Plot summary ==
The film opens in Serra Paylin's living room, when two Russian soldiers knock on the door seeking a tow-truck to lend assistance with their smoldering tank. After some small talk, flirting, and a knock-knock joke, a threesome ensues.

The second scene, referring back to the first, opens with a newspaper headline exclaiming "Paylin endorses Russian penetration!" Then focus shifts to the Faux News Studio, where character Bill Orally sits at the news desk. Orally praises Paylin's recent work in foreign relations, and criticizes what he characterizes as the "hypocritical left".

The third scene takes place in a Washington, D.C. hotel. A female campaign intern is attempting to prepare Serra for interaction with the press. The intern attempts to teach Serra how to correctly pronounce the word "absolutely", which Serra comedically renders as "you betcha". After a frustrating session, Serra leaves in search of "a warm glass of moo juice and some shut eye". After Paylin leaves, the intern declares, "what a fucking air head". In response, Serra's husband slides out from under the bed and replies, "try living with her". The scene ends with an anal sex encounter between Mr. Paylin and the intern.

It's time to drill baby! Drill hard and drill deep. Come on ya tree hugging hippie! What'ya wait'n for, congressional approval?

— Robert Krypton's screenplay

The fourth scene opens in Serra's bedroom, showing her falling into a fitful sleep, and segues into a dream sequence. In the dream, Paylin seduces her husband's business partner at their snowmobile dealership. The scene finishes with the encounter, returning to a Paylin continuing to toss and turn in her sleep.

The fifth scene is another dream, where Serra remembers her collegiate days at "The International University of I-DA-HO" in 1987. Young Serra listens and actively participates in a classroom discussion which focuses on topics in pseudo-science. Serra places the age of the Earth at 10,000 years and classifies fossils as a ruse by Satan to "trick mankind". After class, Young Serra asks the professor if he knows of any rituals to protect her from witchcraft. The professor assures her that vigorous cunnilingus will provide the required protection, and wastes no time demonstrating.

The sixth and final scene opens with a Bill Orally monologue delivered from the Faux News Studio. The Orally piece introduces a Paylin news conference in which she is to defend herself against charges of adultery. During a rambling monologue Paylin avoids answering the adultery question. After the press clears the room, the Hilly character emerges from beneath the podium. The film closes with a lesbian ménage à trois featuring Serra, Hilly, and Candilezza.

== Production ==
Cast of Who's Nailin' Paylin?
| Actor | Role |
| Lisa Ann | Serra Paylin (Sarah Palin) |
| Nina Hartley | Hilly (Hillary Clinton) |
| Jada Fire | Condi (Condoleezza Rice) |
| Sindee Jennings | Young Serra Paylin |
| Sascha | Russian soldier |
| Mick Blue | Russian soldier |
| Alec Knight | Husband (Todd Palin) |
| Lee Stone | Supporting cast |
| Evan Stone | Professor |
| Mike Horner | Bill Orally (Bill O'Reilly) |

Just a few days after the conclusion of the 2008 Republican National Convention, producers for Larry Flynt Publications posted an anonymous help-wanted ad on Craigslist in Los Angeles. The ad called for "a Sarah Palin look-alike for an adult film to be shot in the next 10 days", and specified a salary of $3,000 for the role. According to sex writer Violet Blue, this represented a "pretty shocking" salary for the role.

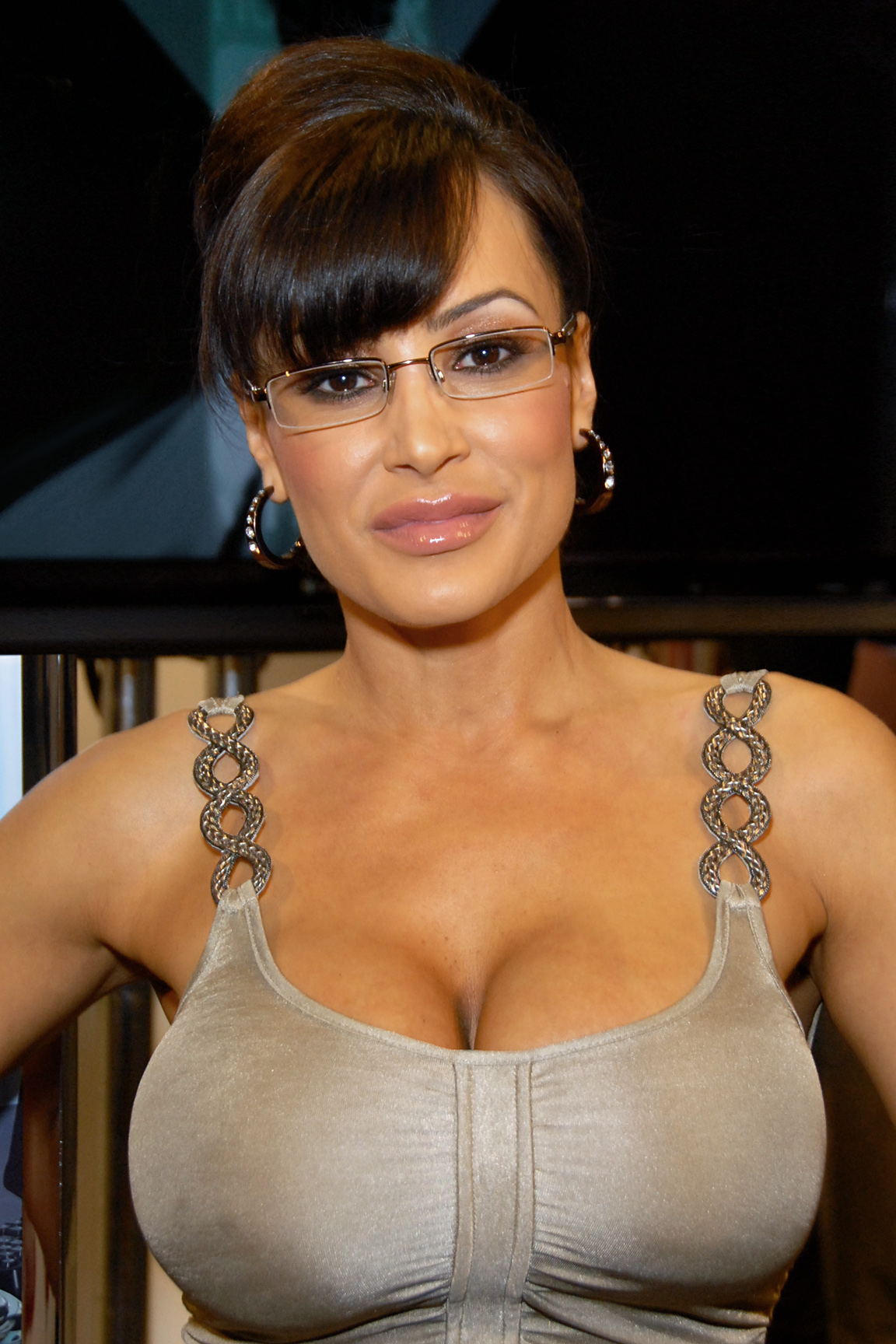
Lisa Ann stars as Serra Paylin.

After being selected for the lead role, actress Lisa Ann had only four days to prepare. The actress prepared for the role by studying Palin's mannerisms during the vice-presidential debate against Joe Biden, as well as Tina Fey's impersonation of her on Saturday Night Live. She bought her Palin-esque costumes online from Macy's, and due to time constraints, altered the clothing herself. Filming began on October 11, 2008, and was completed in two days.

== Reception ==
The film received mainly negative reviews. Critic John Patterson of The Guardian says that "the script's literary values are close to nil, and its political jabs... are often [close] to infantile." Patterson's review also cites "ridiculous dialogue" such as "Drill, baby, drill!" and "I'm speaking in tongues!"

On the other hand, the film's star Lisa Ann has received widespread attention for the role, including interviews by Marie Claire, Entertainment Tonight, and on radio shows. In the interview in Marie Claire, Lisa Ann said that fans were supportive of the movie, calling it "shrewd" and "funny". The actress also feels the film has a "much broader range" than most adult films.

When asked about the possibility of backlash, Lisa Ann replied, "Maybe some crazy right-wing activist will try and burn my house down... But I put myself in that target spot and it is what it is."

On the America's Newsroom program on October 13, Fox News personality Megyn Kelly said that the film is "disgusting, it's dirty -- [the American people] wouldn't want to see it", and questioned the project's legality. Later in the program, defense attorney David Wohl said that the film could be viewed as "a political hit piece", in which case it might be legally actionable.

On November 1, 2008, the Masked Avengers comedy duo prank called Palin by pretending to be Nicolas Sarkozy. (See main article, The Masked Avengers' prank on Sarah Palin.) "Sarkozy" commented that he enjoyed seeing "the documentary on your life, Hustler's Who's Nailin' Paylin?", to which the real Palin replied, "oh good, thank you".

On the British comedy quiz show QI, comedian Jimmy Carr opined that the film is "very good" and "it's a look-ee like-ee, but it'll do".

== Awards and nominations ==
| Year | Ceremony | Result | Category | Film | Recipient |
|---|---|---|---|---|---|
| 2009 | XBIZ Award | Won | Marketing Campaign of the Year | Who's Nailin' Paylin? | —N/a |
| 2009 | XRCO Award | Nominated | Best Comedy – Non-Parody | Who's Nailin' Paylin? | —N/a |
| 2010 | AVN Award | Won | Clever Title of the Year | Who's Nailin' Paylin? | —N/a |
| 2010 | AVN Award | Nominated | Best Actress | Who's Nailin' Paylin? | Lisa Ann |
| 2010 | AVN Award | Nominated | Best Overall Marketing Campaign, Individual Project | Who's Nailin' Paylin? | —N/a |
| 2010 | AVN Award | Nominated | Best Sex Comedy | Who's Nailin' Paylin? | —N/a |
| 2010 | AVN Award | Nominated | Best Interactive DVD | You're Nailin' Palin | —N/a |
| 2010 | AVN Award | Nominated | Best New Series | —N/a | —N/a |
| 2010 | XBIZ Award | Nominated | Feature Movie of the Year | Who's Nailin' Paylin? | —N/a |
| 2010 | XBIZ Award | Nominated | Acting Performance of the Year — Female | Who's Nailin' Paylin? | Lisa Ann |

== Sources ==
- Blue, Violet (October 23, 2008). "No More Palin Porn, Please". SF Gate. San Francisco: Hearst Communications Inc. Archived from the original on October 24, 2008.
- Edwards, David & Kane, Muriel. "Fox concludes Larry Flynt's 'Palin porno' is legal". The Raw Story. Archived from the original on October 15, 2008.
- Hustler Hollywood. "Who's Nailin' Paylin?". West Hollywood: Hustler Hollywood. Archived from the original on November 2, 2008.
- Iannotti, Lauren (2008). "Porn in the U.S.A. Who's Nailin' Paylin?". Marie Claire. San Francisco.
- Krypton, Roger (October 1, 2008). "Who's Nailin' Paylin? Adventures of a Hockey MILF". LFP Video Group. Archived from the original on August 9, 2010.
- Noronha, Charmaine (November 2, 2008). "Palin takes prank call from fake French president". Tuscaloosa News. The Associated Press.
- Patterson, John (October 29, 2008). "Under the Skin". The Guardian. London.
- Rush and Malloy (October 2, 2008). "Larry Flynt is Hustling up an Ala-skin flick with Sarah Palin look-alike". Gossip. New York Daily News. Archived from the original on October 3, 2008.
- Sullivan, David (October 8, 2008). "Hustler Sets Cast for Sarah Palin Spoof". AVN.com. Archived from the original on October 20, 2009.
- "Nailin' Paylin'". October 3, 2008. Archived from the original on December 2, 2008.
- Unreal (October 28, 2008). "Unreal strips down with Sarah Palin, flushes a pumpkin and balloons up for Halloween". Riverfront Times. New York: Village Voice Media. Archived from the original on November 3, 2008.
