= Hustler Video =

American pornographic film studio

- Company type: Private
- Industry: Pornography
- Founded: 1998; 28 years ago
- Founder: Larry Flynt
- Headquarters: United States
- Products: Pornographic films
- Owner: Larry Flynt
- Parent: Larry Flynt Publications
- Subsidiaries: VCA Pictures
- Website: hustler.com

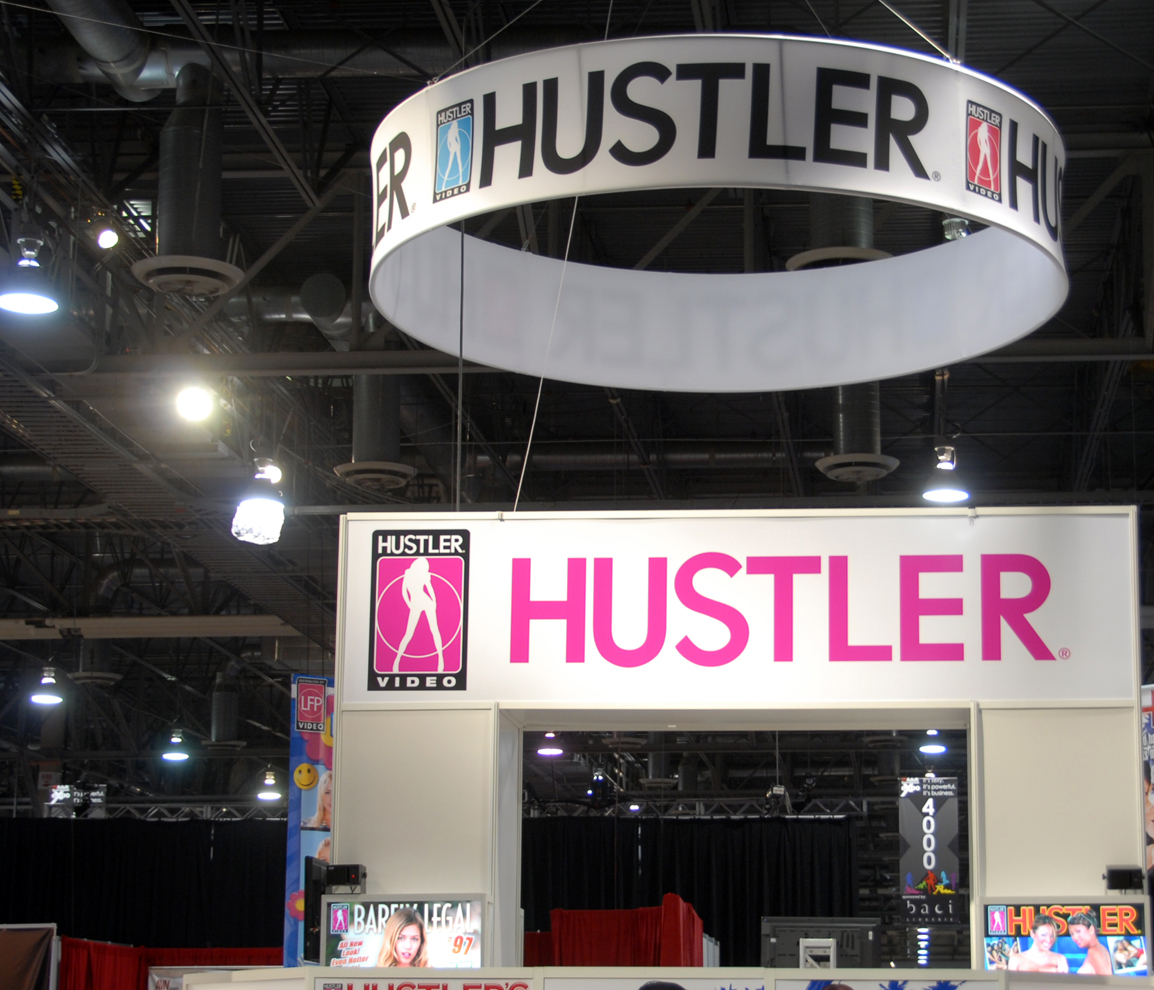
Hustler Booth at the AVN Adult Entertainment Expo at the Sands Convention Center, Las Vegas, Nevada on January 7, 2010.

Hustler Video is an American independent pornographic film studio. It is owned by Larry Flynt's Larry Flynt Publications, and is part of its Hustler-branded range of enterprises, which includes Hustler magazine, the Hustler Casino and the Hustler Hollywood retail outlets. In 2003 Hustler Video bought VCA Pictures, which maintains a separate brand identity within the LFP conglomerate.

Hustler Video is known for their parodies of mainstream movies, and of celebrities, like Paris Hilton, David Hasselhoff or Lindsay Lohan, and TV shows, like "Happy Days", "Star Trek" and "Glee". In response to 2008 Republican presidential nominee John McCain selecting Alaska governor Sarah Palin as his running mate, Hustler placed a classified ad on Craigslist, seeking a Sarah Palin doppelgänger willing to star in a pornographic film while portraying the governor. The film, Who's Nailin' Paylin, was released November 4, 2008 eventually starring Lisa Ann.

== Awards ==
The following is a selection of some of the major pornography awards the studio has won.

- 2002 AVN Award - 'Best All-Sex DVD' for Porno Vision
- 2002 AVN Award - 'Best All-Sex Film' for Porno Vision
- 2002 AVN Award - 'Top Selling Release of the Year' for Snoop Dogg's Doggystyle
- 2003 AVN Award - 'Best Ethnic-Themed Release' for Liquid City
- 2003 AVN Award - 'Best Art Direction - Film' - Kris Kramski for America XXX
- 2003 AVN Award - 'Best Vignette Series for Barely Legal
- 2004 AVN Award - 'Best Vignette Series for Barely Legal
- 2004 AVN Award - 'Top Selling Release of the Year' for Snoop Dogg's Hustlaz: Diary of a Pimp
- 2004 AVN Award - 'Best Ethnic-Themed Release - Black' for Snoop Dogg's Hustlaz: Diary of a Pimp
- 2005 AVN Award - 'Best Amateur Release' for Adventure Sex
- 2005 AVN Award - 'Best All-Sex Release' for Stuntgirl
- 2006 AVN Award - 'Best All-Sex Release' for Squealer
- 2007 AVN Award - 'Best Pro-Am or Amateur Series' for Beaver Hunt
- 2008 AVN Award - 'Best Interactive DVD' for InTERActive
- 2008 AVN Award - 'Best Vignette Series for Barely Legal School Girls
- 2009 AVN Award - 'Best Specialty Series - Other Genre' for Taboo
- 2009 AVN Award - 'Clever Title of the Year' for Strollin in the Colon
- 2010 XBIZ Award - 'Parody Release of the Year' for Not the Bradys XXX: Marcia
- 2011 XBIZ Award - 'Best Art Direction' for This Ain't Avatar XXX 3D
- 2011 XBIZ Award - 'Marketing Campaign of the Year' for This Ain't Avatar XXX
- 2012 XBIZ Award - 'Parody Studio of the Year'
- 2013 XBIZ Award Nominee - 'Studio of the Year', 'Parody Release of the Year-Comedy' for This Ain't Nurse Jackie XXX; Additional nominations include: 'Vignette Release of the Year' for Barely Legal 124 and 'Vignette Series of the Year' for Barely Legal and 'All-Girl Series of the Year' for My First Lesbian Experience
- 2014 AVN Award — Best Retail Chain – Large
- 2014 XBIZ Award - 'Vignette Release of the Year' for Busty Beauties Car Wash

== Legal issues ==
In 2011, Hustler Video was fined $14,175 in workplace safety charges for three separate complaints: a failure to provide protective devices to workers, failure to maintain proper health policies, and failure to provide vaccinations to workers.
