= Mavety =

Mavety is a surname. Notable people with the surname include:

- George W. Mavety (c. 1936–2000), American magazine publisher
- Larry Mavety (1942–2020), Canadian ice hockey player
