= Rayveness =

American pornographic actress

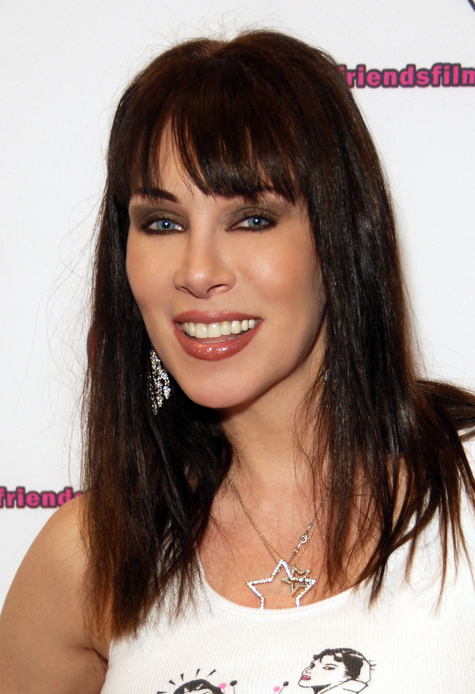
- Rayveness in 2010
- Born: 1972 (age 53–54); North Carolina, U.S.
- Occupation: Pornographic film actress

Rayveness (born 1972) is an American pornographic and mainstream film actress. She is an inductee of both the AVN Hall of Fame and the XRCO Hall of Fame.

== Career ==
Rayveness's first appearance in a pornographic film was a homemade tape she made with her then-husband at the age of 18, after seeing an episode of The Sally Jessy Raphael Show about amateur pornography. Rather than becoming a full-time pornographic performer right away, she sold flowers in nightclubs and worked as a waitress and a stripper.

In 2000, she took a break from the adult film business to pursue acting in mainstream films. She dyed her hair red and wore brown contact lenses to minimize the chance of someone recognizing her. She appeared in a speaking role on NYPD Blue and was in Path to War as President Lyndon B. Johnson's eldest daughter, Lynda. She returned to the adult industry in 2003 after the death of John Frankenheimer, who was her primary connection to the mainstream industry.

In July 2009, Rayveness became the first contract star for the all-female studio Girlfriends Films, although the contract allowed her to continue boy-girl work elsewhere. She is a member of the XRCO Hall of Fame and the AVN Hall of Fame. In 2019, she appeared alongside fellow pornographic actresses Lisa Ann and Cory Chase in an episode of the Showtime series Billions titled "Infinite Game".

== Personal life ==
A native of Jamestown, North Carolina., Rayveness grew up in the Quaker faith and married a year before she left high school. By 2000, she had divorced and remarried, this time to porn actor Tod Alexander. They divorced in 2003. In 2004, she filed a petition with Congressman Brad Sherman requesting that the age requirement for pornography performers be raised from 18 to 21, saying that "People right out of high school in this country don't seem to have the foresight to make such life-altering decisions."
