= Word Up! (magazine) =

Entertainment magazine

Word Up! Magazine was an American teen entertainment magazine that debuted in August 1987. It focused on hip-hop music and rap artists.

The magazine was name-checked by The Notorious B.I.G. in his 1994 hit song "Juicy": "It was all a dream; I used to read Word Up! magazine."

A spin-off of Right On! magazine, Word Up! was headquartered in Paramus, NJ, Enoble Media and John Blassingame with Gerrie Summers as founding editor-in-chief, shortly after replaced by Kate Ferguson . In the 2020s, both magazines were purchased by Cynthia Horner, former editor-in-chief of Right On!, forming Right On! Media Holdings, LLC. Its principal photographer was Ernie Paniccioli, who later claimed the magazine's mention in "Juicy" was intended for him.

Without knowledge of the original owners, the estate of the Notorious B.I.G. and Budweiser produced two special editions of Word Up! in 2023, celebrating the artist and the 30th anniversary of Ready to Die. John Blassingame's son, the founding style editor of Word Up Publications resurfaced Word Up Magazine on Instagram (wordupmagazine_hiphop) to reintroduce the publication via his streetwear platforms using the materials that he produced for the magazine and had been building the platform since 2018. Marcus has plans to honor his family's legacy via multiple media platform including his interview with Ernie Paniccioli as seen on IN BLVCK MEDIA https://inblackmagazine.com/2023/11/16/ernie-paniccioli/ . The relaunch was not sanctioned".
