= Juggs =

American pornographic magazine

- First issue, August 1981
- Categories: Pornographic magazine
- Frequency: Monthly
- Publisher: M M Publications, Ltd., Subsidiary of Mavety Media Group
- First issue: August 1981
- Country: United States
- Language: English
- ISSN: 0734-4309

Juggs is a softcore pornographic magazine for adults published in the United States, specialising in photographs of women with large breasts.

Particularly attractive to breast fetishists, it was described in 1999 as "the magazine of choice for breast men" by Jerry Saltz, art critic for The Village Voice news magazine.

Featured models in Juggs included such famous female erotic models as Traci Lords, Candy Samples,, Norma Stitz, Roberta Pedon, and Tina Small.

The magazine was published by George W. Mavety's publishing company, Mavety Media Group (MMG), which had previously been known for publishing gay pornography magazines in the United States. Juggs was distributed by Larry Flynt Publications. The magazine's readership was mostly blue-collar men in the American South and Midwest.

Dian Hanson, Juggs' editor for 15 years, has described the magazine as "the epitome of bad taste... a humorous magazine, a sexual sideshow."

== Dian Hanson years ==
From 1986 to 2001, Juggs was helmed by Dian Hanson, who had edited multiple pornographic magazines since 1977. She has said that when she took over Juggs and its sister publication Leg Show:

Both of those magazines were published by MMG, which put out the majority of the gay magazines in America in the mid '80s. Juggs and Leg Show were put together by an all-gay staff, who didn't really care about them, but had lots of fun doing them. You could hear the hoots of laughter and derision.

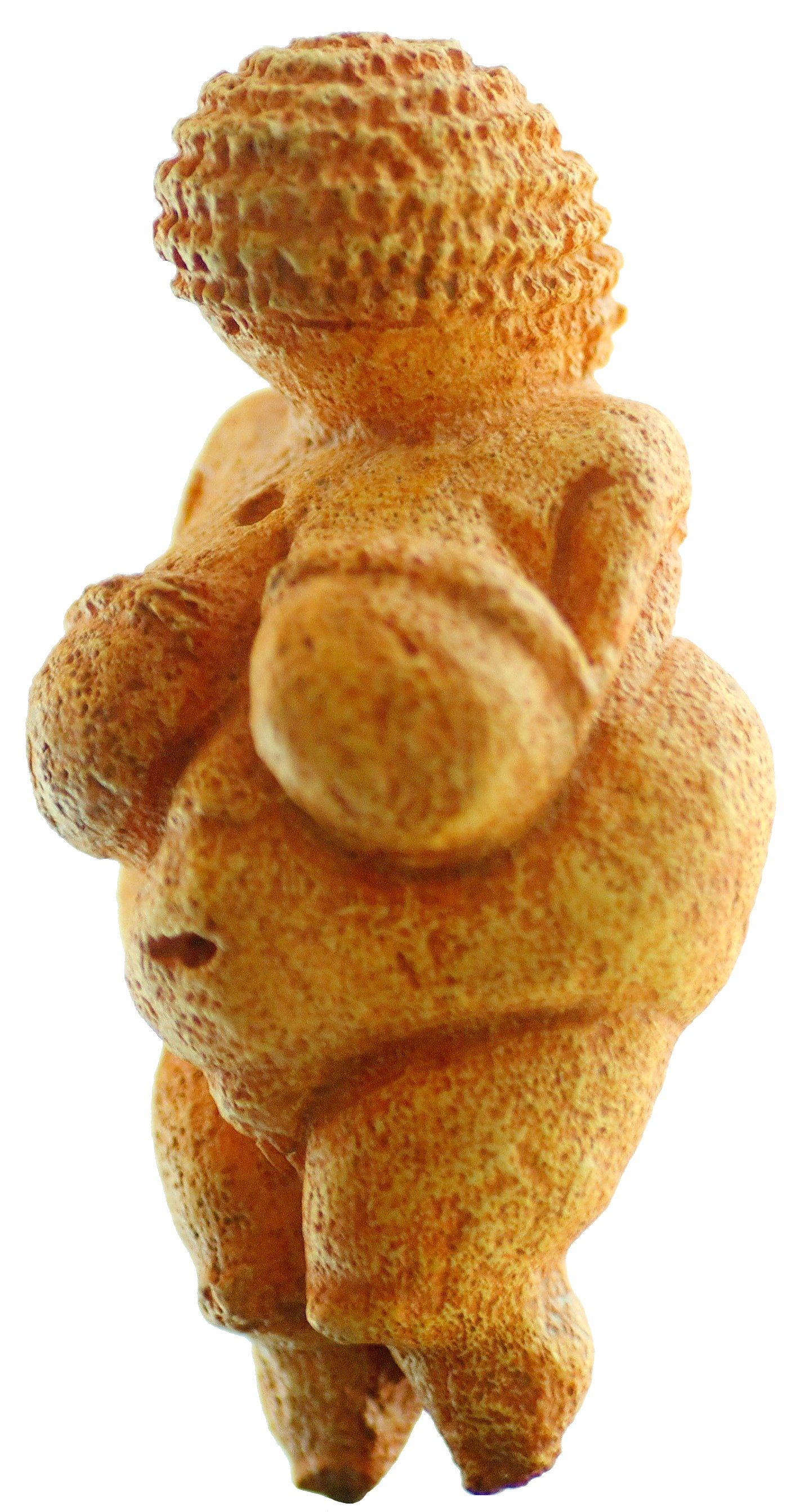
The Venus of Willendorf

Hanson began putting in pictorials of women modeled after the Venus of Willendorf, a prehistoric fertility symbol with enormous breasts and a massive belly, which she saw as a piece of early pornography for cavemen. She also included the theme of erotic lactation in the magazine's headlines and short stories. Hanson stated the magazine's monthly circulation nearly doubled, from 85,000 at the time she joined as editor to 150,000 by 1996. Hanson said that Juggs was seen as less threatening to women than many other pornographic magazines, who saw its less than perfect models as closer to themselves, and were more willing to submit their photographs there than to any other magazine she worked at in 25 years.

Hanson left Juggs in August 2001, a year after its publisher, George Mavety, died, leaving the company in the hands of people she did not want to work for.

== Contributors ==
Heather Hooters was a regular columnist from June 1994. The pornographic film actress Candy Samples had a regular column in Juggs from 1986 through August 2007. Kelly Madison was a regular columnist from June 2002. Cartoonist Bill Ward wrote and illustrated an article a month for the magazine in his later years.

== In popular culture ==
The magazine title, a slang term for breasts, has become the perennial punch line of any joke that requires a pornographic magazine. It is used by leading American media including Time Magazine, CBS News, and The New York Times as the immediately recognizable title of a pornographic magazine, without further explanation needed.

After Juggs published a review of artist John Currin's exhibition in 1998, the magazine's approval was still being used to define the artist's work 11 years later.

In an episode of the television show Sex and the City which originally aired in 2000 (season 3 episode 15), Trey MacDougal is caught masturbating with the aid of a copy of Juggs magazine.
