= Teen magazine =

Magazine aimed at teenage readers

Teen magazines are magazines aimed at teenage readers. They usually consist of gossip, news, fashion tips and interviews and may include posters, stickers, small samples of cosmetics or other products and inserts.

The teen magazine industry is overwhelmingly female-oriented. Several publications, such as Teen Ink and Teen Voices, cater to both male and female audiences, although publications specifically targeting teenage boys are rare. Many scholars have critiqued teen magazines, as the topics presented are narrow and only present a limited range of female roles, some believe that they are effective because of the relationship developed between magazine and reader. There is a distinct feminine space that is made by the text itself as editors of teen magazines focus on making the content of their text appropriate to the analytical ability of their readers.

Along with most mainstream magazines, teen magazines are typically sold in print at supermarkets, pharmacies, bookstores and newsstands.

== History ==
Teen magazines first gained prominence in the United States during the 1940s, with Seventeen magazine being the first known publication geared towards a demographic of teenage girls. Examples of popular magazines during that time include Sassy, YM, CosmoGirl, Teen, and Teen People. Nowadays, popular contemporary American teen magazines include Seventeen, Teen Vogue, J-14, and Tiger Beat.

Teen magazines are produced in many countries worldwide, and are widely popular in Australia, Americas, Europe, and Asia. In the United Kingdom, Fleetway's Honey (1960–1986) is regarded as having established the sector. Large-scale Canadian teen magazines include the Faze magazine.

Since 1972, teen magazines in the United States have reached out to the African-American market with publications such as Right On! (produced by Sterling-McFadden, which also produces Tiger Beat) and Word Up!.

In the United Kingdom, changes in the way teenagers spend their money (and the fact that there were fewer of them, though they had more cash) led to many casualties in the 1990s because titles were unable to compete with mobile, digital and online media. Magazine publishers have moved down the age range with publications for "tweenagers" (those aged 9 to 13) gaining popularity, such as It's Hot, BOP, J-14 and Tiger Beat.

== Audience ==
Although in the United States, adolescence is generally considered to be the period between the ages 11 and 19, and teen magazines usually cater to people within that range, many readers comprise an even wider age range. According to a 2006 report by Magazine Publishers of America, 78% of teens read magazines. Of the media that adolescents refer to for information about sex, teen magazines are particularly important because they influence knowledge, attitudes, and values about sex and sexuality, especially for teenage girls.

According to Amy S. Pattee, author of The Developmental Appropriateness of Teen Magazines, the experience of reading teen magazines can result in heavy psychological impacts on their readers. The covers and content of the latest teen magazines promise adolescent girls dates, beauty, and success. Compared to the rich superstar singer, and the skinniest model shown and praised in the magazine, the reader is most likely to be left with a negative self-image and a heavy desire to aspire to be just like the women they read about.

== Subgenres ==
Teen magazines tend to be categorised as lifestyle (e.g. Sugar), entertainment (often based on music), or comics.

While some teen magazines focus almost exclusively on music and film stars, others feature more extensive coverage of lifestyle issues and are virtually junior versions of magazines such as Cosmopolitan or Cleo. Cosmopolitan is more focused on readers between the ages of 18 and 25, whereas Seventeen and Teen Vogue are geared towards teenagers and focus more on the bubbly teen gossip, celebrity culture, and newly stated trends on fashion and beauty.

== On the web ==
In recent years, rapid technological advancement and the rise of the Internet has led to the emergence of online teen magazines. Examples include Faze in Canada, which is published in both web and print versions, and Rookie, an independently run online magazine and book series founded in 2011 by Editor-in-Chief Tavi Gevinson, which publishes writing, photography, and other forms of artwork by and for teenagers. With a digital format, the accessibility of teen magazines has also greatly increased, reaching readers from a diverse range of backgrounds and nationalities.

In the UK, sales in the teen magazine sector peaked in 1998. Teenagers had many more attractions competing for their cash and their attention, such as media delivered on the web and through mobile phones. Also, the booming celebrity weeklies attracted more teens from ever-younger ages (driven by celebrity TV series). In response to this, in April 2007, National Magazines - publisher of Cosmopolitan and Cosmo Girl! - launched a digital weekly magazine for teens, Jellyfish, in a trial. This was the second attempt in the UK to establish a new online business model, the first being Monkey from Dennis, which aims to sell to men aged 18 to 34. In both cases, readers sign up to be sent the 'eMag' by email. Each issue features interactive elements and 'pages' that can be 'turned'. However, National Magazines closed Cosmo Girl! in June and the Jellyfish experiment was drawn to a close in August.

== Critical reception ==
The experience of reading teen magazines can result in heavy psychological impacts on their readers. Teen magazines may give implicit suggestions on how women should or should not behave. The teen magazine, with its images of corporeal perfection and promises of social success, can be seen as evidence of a social ideal to which developing teens may aspire when reading the magazine. Self-development is influenced by an individual's alignment with a social group. Sexualized content in teen magazines, including contradictory advice of abstinence and sexual exploration, has been criticized for its effects on teenage girls. Teen magazines may influence teenage girls' understanding of work, with emphasis on professional occupations and the entertainment industry.

The embarrassing stories column that is popular in most, if not all, teen magazines, is constructed not only to entertain the reader but also to offer behavioral guidance. The texts of these columns, titled, “Say Anything” in YM, “Trauma Rama” in Seventeen, and “Why Me?” in Teen, consist of a collection of embarrassing incidents in the magazine readers’ lives. Readers are encouraged to write to the magazine's editors with their own tales, which, if published, are rated by the magazine staff. These ratings imply an mutual empathy and personal interaction between the author of the story and the reader. The teenage reader, made aware of the risks of certain behaviors in certain scenarios can, by study these columns, and develop an understanding of societal rules.

== See also ==
- List of teen magazines
- Teen drama - list of teen dramas
- Teen film - list of teen films
- Teen idol
- Teen pop
- Teen sitcom - list of teen sitcoms
