= Modern Man (magazine) =

American magazine

- Categories: Men's Monthly Magazine
- Publisher: Publishers Development Corp.
- First issue: July 1951
- Final issue: December 1976
- Country: United States of America
- Language: English

Modern Man (subtitled "The Picture Magazine for Men" / "The Man's Picture Magazine" / "The Adult Picture Magazine") was a monthly men's magazine founded in 1951 and run until 1976. Predating Playboy, Modern Man focused on items of interest to adult men, with an emphasis on soft-core pornography, sex, humor, automobiles and popular culture. It featured photographs of many well-known models and actresses, including Marilyn Monroe, Pat Sheehan, Bambi Hamilton, June Blair, Tara Thomas, Dolores Reed, Jayne Mansfield, and Mamie Van Doren, as well as questionable look-alikes.

== See also ==
- List of men's magazines
- List of pornographic magazines
