= Lisa Ann =

American pornographic film actress (born 1972)

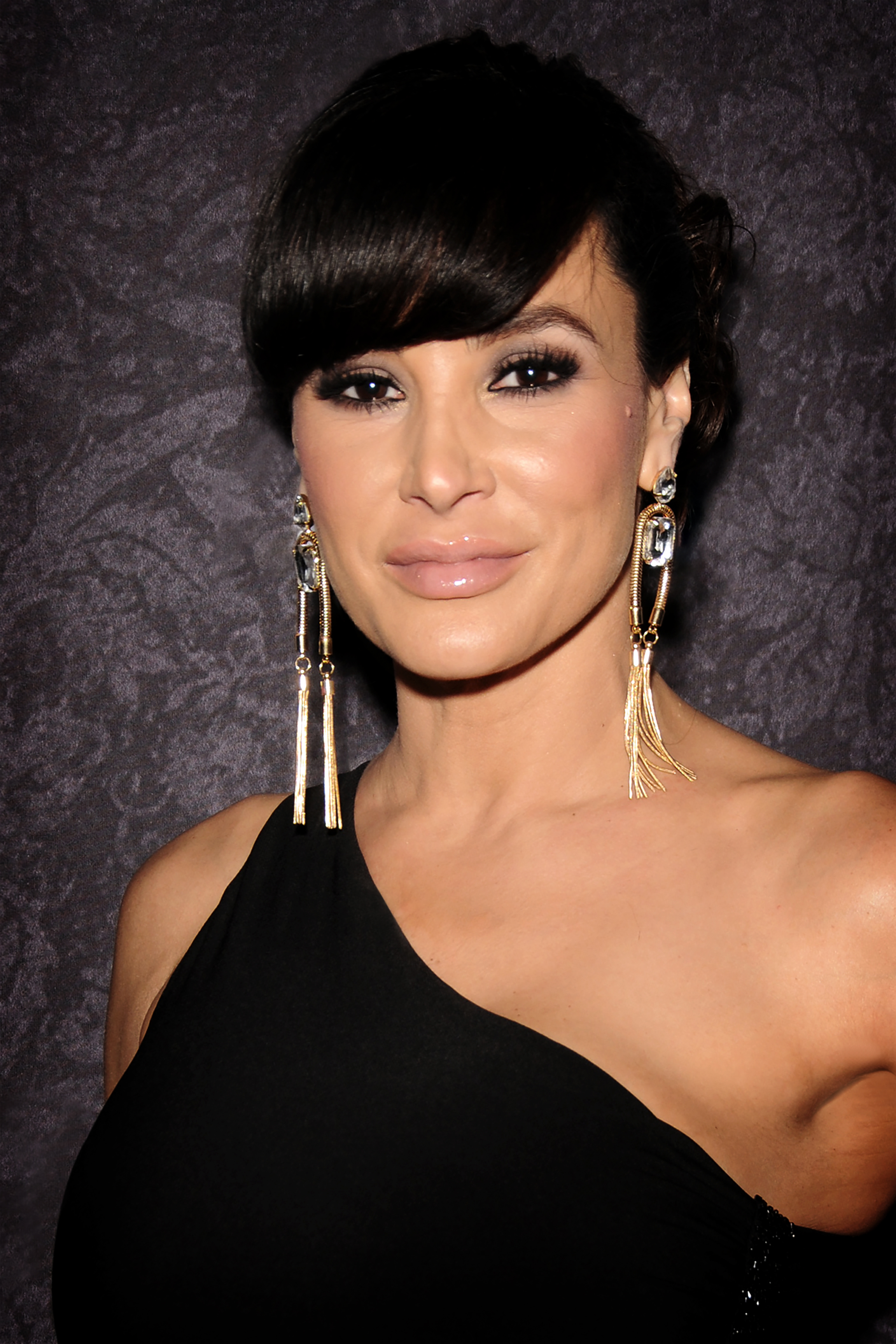
- Ann in 2014
- Born: Lisa Ann Corpora; May 9, 1972 (age 54); Easton, Pennsylvania, U.S.
- Occupations: Pornographic film actress; radio personality
- Years active: 1994–1997; 2006–2014; 2018–2020
- Website: thereallisaann.com

Lisa Ann Corpora (born May 9, 1972), known professionally as Lisa Ann, is a retired American pornographic film actress and radio personality. She has also worked as a director and talent agent. She parodied former Governor of Alaska Sarah Palin in six adult films and a music video. She is a member of the AVN, XRCO, and Urban X Halls of Fame. Ann has been described as one of the most popular and successful pornographic film actresses in the world.

Ann quit porn in 1997 due to an AIDS scare in the industry, but resumed performing in February 2006. In 2008, she starred as "Serra Paylin", a parody of Republican vice presidential nominee Sarah Palin, in Hustler Video's Who's Nailin' Paylin?, which was released on Election Day. Her directorial film, MILF Revolution (2013), won the 2014 AVN Award for "Best MILF Release". In December 2014, she launched Porn Stars Boot Camp, a consulting firm, and also announced her retirement from performing in adult films. Four years later, in 2018, Ann announced her comeback to the adult industry, signing with Evil Angel.

Prior to beginning her adult entertainment career, Ann appeared as a "Snapple Girl" on The Howard Stern Show. She played Palin in the music video for the song "We Made You" by American rapper Eminem. She voiced a character known as "Prostitute #2" in the video game Grand Theft Auto V, released in September 2013. Ann appeared alongside Rayveness and Cory Chase in Season 4, Episode 7 of the Showtime series Billions titled Infinite Game. In 2013, she hosted a SiriusXM show titled Stripper Town. In early 2016, she began participating in fantasy baseball. In 2023, Ann began working with Bret Raybould on Better Halves with Lisa Ann and Bret Raybould on SiriusXM, a weekly comical therapy session that journeys into the world of dating, sex, and relationships.

== Early life ==
Lisa Ann was born in Easton, Pennsylvania, on May 9, 1972.

== Career ==
=== Pornographic film ===
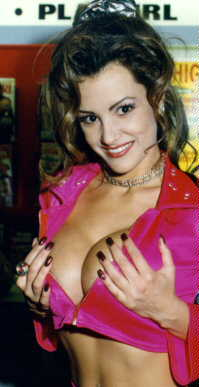
Ann, circa 1994–1995

During the first two years of Ann's adult film career, she was under contract with Metro/Cal Vista and shot only once a month with porn artist John O'Rourke. She quit porn in 1997 due to an AIDS scare in the industry and spent the following seven years stripping. She also owned a day spa for four years during her hiatus from porn. She decided to resume performing in February 2006 after being asked to do a boy/girl photo shoot for Suze Randall. The first scene she shot after returning to the industry was with Christian XXX in Bra Bustin' and Deep Thrustin'.

Ann was selected to co-host the XRCO Awards in April 2010. She retired from pornography in 2014, which she announced via a Facebook post. She had a breast reduction surgery shortly after retiring from porn. Following her retirement, she continued to perform in webcam shows occasionally. In January 2018, she announced her return to the adult industry, signing with Evil Angel and making four more scenes. Her first scene was with male pornographic performer Isiah Maxwell for her website thelisaann.com.

Ann is considered to be one of the most popular and successful pornographic film actresses in the world.

==== Sarah Palin impersonation ====
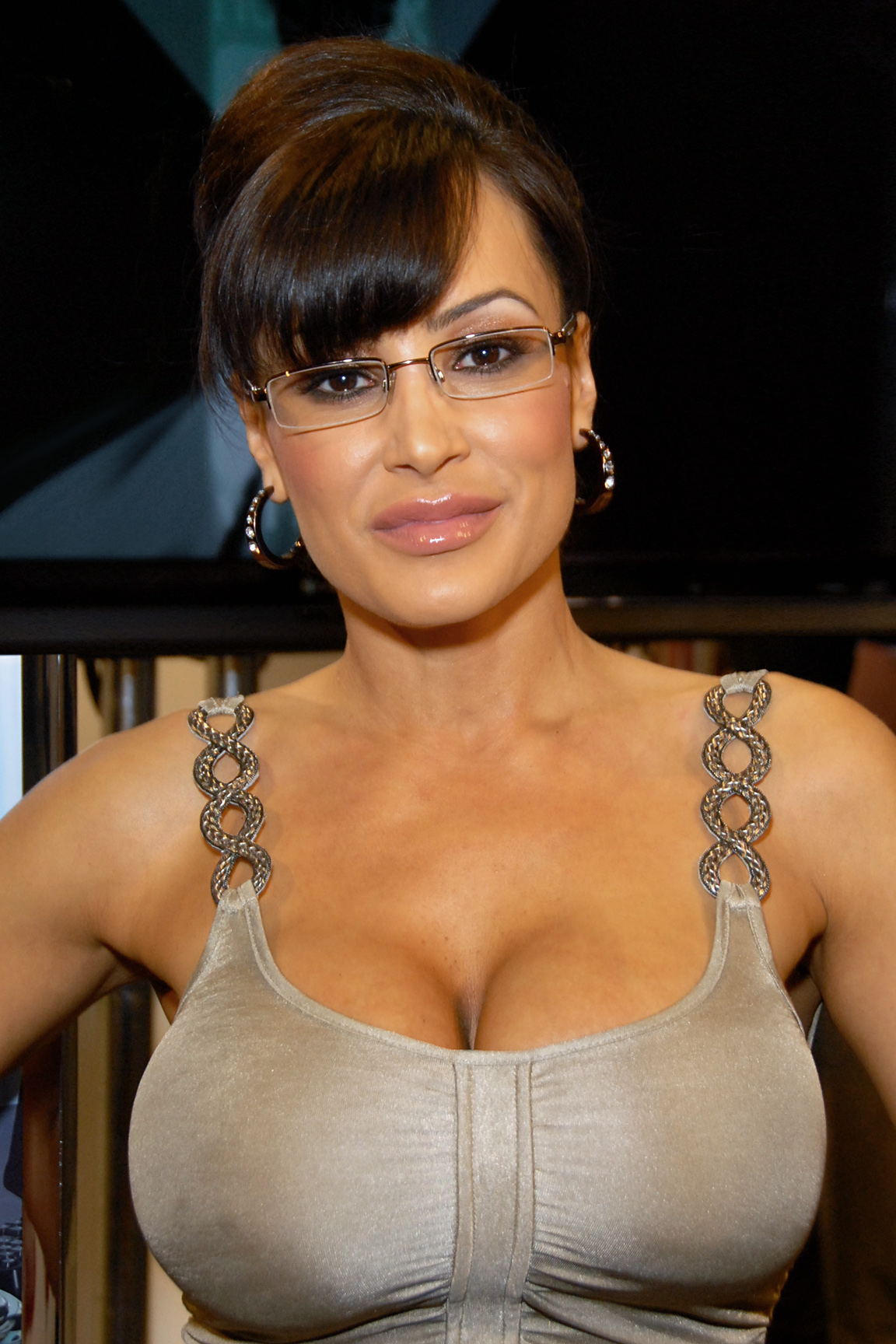
Ann as Serra Paylin, a character that is a parody of Sarah Palin in January 2010

In 2008, Ann starred as "Serra Paylin", a parody of 2008 Republican vice presidential nominee Sarah Palin, in Hustler Video's Who's Nailin' Paylin?, which was released on election day on November 4, 2008. Hustler contacted her to offer her the part on the day of the vice-presidential debate, which she viewed to learn Palin's mannerisms in preparation for the role. She also studied Tina Fey's impressions of Palin on Saturday Night Live. Afterward she became one of streaming video site AEBN's most popular female performers . She portrayed Palin again for the sequels Obama Is Nailin' Palin, Letterman's Nailin' Palin, You're Nailin' Palin, Hollywood's Nailin' Palin, and Who's Nailin' Palin? 2. Hustler also produced a mask in the likeness of her portraying Palin for Halloween in 2009. She reprised her role as Palin in the music video for the song "We Made You" by Eminem. She has also performed as Palin at various strip clubs.

=== Directing ===
Ann made her directorial debut with the film, Hung XXX, released on September 22, 2009, by Justin Slayer International. In August 2013, she launched her own production company, Lisa Ann Productions, and signed a distribution deal with Jules Jordan Video. Her directorial debut for the company, MILF Revolution, was released on August 5, 2013. MILF Revolution won the 2014 AVN Award for "Best MILF Release".

=== Other ventures ===
Ann worked as a talent agent for LA Direct Models between September 2005 and February 2006. According to Ann, female performers in the industry who were 30 years or older were rejected by other agents and had to represent themselves despite the demand for them amid the "MILF phenomenon", which motivated her to start her own agency and represent them. She launched Clear Talent Management in November 2006, which was later renamed Lisa Ann's Talent Management and merged with Adam Glasser's Lighthouse Agency in 2007 before closing in July 2010.

In December 2009, it was announced that Ann had signed on to be the spokeswoman for RealTouch, a mechanized artificial vagina produced by AEBN. She later had her own genitalia molded for Fleshlight in 2011.

In 2013, Ann hosted a show titled Stripper Town on SiriusXM. She currently co-hosts two SiriusXM radio shows, Lisa Ann Does Fantasy, alongside Adam Ronis, on Monday nights, and The Morning Men on Thursday mornings. In 2023, Ann began a weekly podcast/show with SiriusXM. Better Halves with Lisa Ann and Bret Raybould is a comical therapy session that journeys into the world of dating, sex, and relationships.

In December 2014, she said that she is pursuing a career in fantasy football. By January 2016, she was also slowly getting involved with fantasy baseball.

On December 15, 2015, Ann released a memoir titled The Life.

=== Mentoring ===
In August 2014, Ann reached out to fellow porn actress Belle Knox, also known as the "Duke [University] porn star". Through her agent, who also represents Knox, she wanted to see "How's she doing?" She has been mentoring an average of 10 to 15 girls since 2005. In an interview conducted by XBIZ, Ann said she could sympathize with the media attention that Knox had faced. She had a similar experience when playing former vice presidential candidate Sarah Palin. "I understand that being a new girl in the business can be a very lonely place... She's already out on the road feature dancing, already has a million opportunities and I feel like if that all happened to me, if 'Palin' had happened to me at 19, I don't know how I would've managed it," she said. "So I reached out to her and we started just a little bit of mentoring by text, by phone, by Skype. And I enjoyed the bond when we talked." In December 2014, Ann launched Porn Stars Boot Camp, a consulting firm.

== Mainstream appearances ==
Ann appeared on The Howard Stern Show as a "Snapple Girl" prior to the launching her adult entertainment career. On November 7, 2008, she appeared on Entertainment Tonight to promote Who's Nailin' Paylin?

Ann was ranked fifth on Complex magazine's list of "The Top 100 Hottest Porn Stars (Right Now)" in 2011. She was also placed on CNBC's annual list "The Dirty Dozen: Porn's Most Popular Stars" in 2011, 2012, 2014, and 2015.

She was among sixteen pornographic film actresses profiled in the 2013 documentary film Aroused. In August 2013, she starred in the music video for the song "Dead Bite" by Hollywood Undead. She voiced a character known as "Prostitute #2" in the video game Grand Theft Auto V, released in September 2013.

Ann appeared alongside Rayveness and Cory Chase in Season 4, Episode 7 of the Showtime series Billions, titled "Infinite Game".

== Advocacy ==
Ann does not identify with any political party. In October 2008, she said she was voting for Barack Obama in the 2008 presidential election and that she was previously a supporter of Hillary Clinton. She supported Obama again in the 2012 presidential election.

In March 2010, Ann appeared in a public service announcement for the Free Speech Coalition on the topic of copyright infringement of adult content, directed by Michael Whiteacre.

On October 14, 2010, Ann announced that she would only be shooting scenes with condoms after a male performer in the industry was diagnosed with HIV. She also stated that the STD testing system at the time was not sufficient to protect performers, and encouraged other performers to also demand condom use during shoots. In August 2012, she called for legislation mandating condom use in heterosexual adult films and questioned the standards of syphilis treatment for performers by industry doctors. In August 2013, she stated that a male performer she was scheduled to work with may have tested positive for hepatitis C and tried to work anyway. She stated that the performer showed her a test from a facility outside of the industry which did not indicate any results for hepatitis and that she discovered two adult performer testing databases had him listed as unavailable to work. Subsequently, the Adult Production Health & Safety Services announced that they would start implementing monthly hepatitis B, hepatitis C, and trichomoniasis testing on August 19, 2013. While in the industry, she paid for a fresh round of tests for her co-stars to ensure they were negative for STIs.

Ann has campaigned to destigmatize interracial pornography by speaking out about the treatment of black performers in the industry and the lack of work for them. She also wants to help transform the industry to give performers pensions, health insurance, and career guidance.

In 2015, she competed and won the FantasyFootballNerd.com Charity League playing for the charity Blessings in a Backpack which mobilizes communities, individuals and resources to provide food on the weekends for elementary school children across the U.S. who might otherwise go hungry.

== Personal life ==
Ann moved to Huntington Beach, California c. 1993. She previously lived in Boca Raton, Florida, for a year. As of October 2015, she owns a condo in Los Angeles and an apartment in Midtown Manhattan. She is a sports fan; her favorite sports are basketball and football. She stated that if she had not worked in the adult film industry, she would have liked to become a sports agent or writer, blogger, and reporter. She is a fan of the Los Angeles Lakers and the Dallas Cowboys.

At age 28, she married a bouncer, whom she later divorced. In November 2009, she told TMZ that she started dating Rob Kardashian after meeting him at a gym. A source close to Kardashian spoke to Us Weekly and confirmed that they met at a gym, but denied Ann's statement that they were dating. Due to her interest in sports and professional athletes, along with her work as a sports reporter for the Sirius/XM network, Ann has attended numerous games, which has led to interaction, sometimes publicly, with athletes. In October 2014, speculation was raised whether Ann and 18-year-old Notre Dame football player Justin Brent were dating when the two appeared at a game together. After their appearance at Madison Square Garden, personal photos of the two in bed together were released online. In November 2014, she commented via her Twitter account regarding requests made to her by former New York Rangers hockey player Michael Del Zotto.

In a February 2014 interview with GQ magazine, sportswriter Myles Brown, Ann wrote, "...if dudes could be with Victoria's Secret models, that's how I look at athletes. I'm 42. I'm looking at 18, 19, 20-year-old guys. They're at the beginning of their lives, so they're still excited, naïve and simple. They're not negative yet."

When asked how many athletes she had slept with, she replied, "In my life in the [adult] business for twenty-something years? A lot. Hundreds." She stated that her favored athletes for interaction or relationships are NBA players. Ann said this could lead to awkward situations, such as when players are traded and several athletes she is in contact with are on the same team, a situation she makes an effort to avoid. "I don't mess with multiple guys on a team at the same time. I don't want to be in any locker room talk."

In March 2015, during the annual March Madness NCAA basketball tournament, there was media attention regarding her involvement in a promotion in conjunction with the production studio Brazzers. The contest, "Win a Date with Lisa Ann", was co-sponsored by the studio and offered an all-expense-paid trip to the national championship game for the best trick shot video submitted. Unexpectedly, Brazzers withdrew the promotion via press release, effectively shutting down the contest.

== Awards ==
- 2007 XRCO Award – Best Cumback
- 2007 Adam Film World Guide Award – Porn Cumback of the Year
- 2009 AVN Award – MILF/Cougar Performer of the Year
- 2009 AVN Hall of Fame
- 2009 AEBN VOD Award – Performer of the Year
- 2010 XRCO Award – MILF of the Year
- 2010 F.A.M.E. Award – Favorite MILF
- 2010 XFANZ Award – MILF of the Year
- 2010 Exotic Dancer Award – Adult Movie Entertainer of the Year
- 2010 Urban X Award – Best Anal Release – Lisa Ann's Hung XXX
- 2011 AEBN VOD Award – Performer of the Year
- 2011 Legends of Erotica Hall of Fame
- 2011 XBIZ Award – MILF Performer of the Year
- 2011 Urban X Award – MILF of the Year
- 2011 Urban X Hall of Fame
- 2011 Fame Registry Award – MILF of the Year
- 2012 XBIZ Award – Adult Star Branded Pleasure Product of the Year
- 2012 Urban X Award – MILF Performer of the Year
- 2012 Fame Registry Award – MILF of the Year
- 2012 NightMoves Award – Best MILF Performer (Fan's Choice)
- 2012 NightMoves Award – Best Individual Website (Fan's Choice)
- 2013 AVN – Game Changer
- 2013 XRCO Hall of Fame
- 2013 Fanny Award – MILF Performer of the Year
- 2013 Fanny Award – Movie of the Year – Lisa Ann Can't Say No
- 2013 Fame Registry Award – MILF of the Year
- 2013 NightMoves Award – Social Media Star (Editor's Choice)
- 2014 AVN Award – Hottest MILF (Fan Award)
- 2014 AVN Award – Best MILF Release – MILF Revolution
- 2014 Fame Registry Award – MILF of the Year
- 2014 Nightmoves Award – Best MILF Performer (Fan's Choice)
- 2016 XBIZ Award – Crossover Star of the Year
- 2019 Urban X Award – Best MILF Movie – Lisa Ann's Black Out 3
- 2025 Fanny Award – Lifetime Achievement Award

== See also ==
- List of Italian-American entertainers
- List of people from the Lehigh Valley
- List of pornographic performers by decade
