= Norma Stitz =

American fetish model

- Born: Annie Hawkins; 1957 or 1958 (age 68–69)
- Spouse: Alan Turner (m. 1992; died 2005)
- Website: normastitz.com

Annie Hawkins-Turner (née Hawkins), better known by her stage name Norma Stitz, is an American fetish model. Her pseudonym is a word-play on "enormous tits", a result of gigantomastia. She holds the Guinness World Record for largest natural breasts.

== Career ==
According to Stitz, she won a layout contest for the amateur section of Juggs magazine at 37, after which she began working in the adult entertainment industry. On 15 July 2012, Hawkins-Turner appeared on the TLC television series Strange Sex. She has also appeared on The Jenny Jones Show. As Norma Stitz, she has made approximately 250 softcore pornography films. She describes herself as a "fantasy model", adding: "No hardcore, that means no sex." Her video The Amazing Norma Stitz has been reviewed in Adult Video News.

== Honors and recognition ==
In 2016, Hawkins-Turner's likeness was included in a newly opened wax museum in Ha Long, Vietnam.

Hawkins-Turner was inducted into the 'BBW Hall of Fame' in 2018.

== See also ==
- Bra size
- Breast hypertrophy
