= High Society (magazine) =

U.S. pornographic magazine

- Categories: Men's magazines
- Frequency: Monthly
- Publisher: Blair Publishing Group
- First issue: May 1976; 49 years ago
- Country: United States
- Language: English
- Website: company.highsociety.com

High Society is an American pornographic magazine. In addition to hardcore pictorials of nude models, it also has feature articles and occasional celebrity pictorials.

== History ==
High Society was first published in May 1976. Carl Ruderman hired the adult industry's first female men's magazine editor, Gloria Leonard, in 1977.

Leonard, an adult film star, is credited with the use of "900" and "976 phone numbers" to advertise upcoming magazine issues. This evolved into the very first "phone sex" lines.

In November 1981 a spin-off magazine, High Society Live!, debuted. Another venture was a celebrity focused publication, Celebrity Skin magazine, in 1986. The 10th Anniversary Issue of High Society, published May, 1986 featured Gail Thackray (Gail Harris) with a 10-page spread, Centerfold and Front cover. Over its 25-year run Margot Kidder, Ann-Margret and Barbra Streisand unsuccessfully attempted to sue the magazine after it published nude photos of them.

High Society has a pay-per-view TV channel.

The magazine is published by the Magna Publishing Group, which was acquired by 1-800-PHONESEX on December 22, 2015.
