= Jerome Tanner =

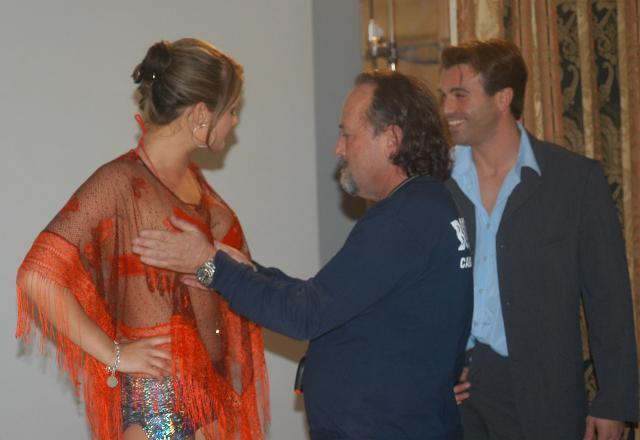
Jerome Tanner (center)

Jerome Tanner (a.k.a. Lex T. Drill, Lex Drill, Jerry Tanner) is a pornographic film producer/director.

== Awards ==
- 1987 AVN Award – Best Director (Video) – Club Exotica
- 2006 AVN Hall of Fame inductee
- 2006 Adam Film World Guide Award – Lifetime Achievement Award
