= Cynthia Horner =

American writer and editor

Cynthia Horner is a writer, magazine editor, and entertainment industry entrepreneur. An African-American woman, Horner is based in New York City.

Former Right On! Magazine Editorial Director, Cynthia Horner (now one of its owners) was born in Anderson, Indiana, the eldest of three children, and relocated to Southern California where she developed her career as a writer. By the age of 11, she had become the editor of her elementary school newspaper; while attending Newbury Park High School in Newbury Park, California, she became a professional journalist, writing stories about her community and high school for the local newspapers, and was granted early admission to Seaver College of Pepperdine University at Malibu where she received scholarships from Scripps-Howard Publishers, and the Seaver College Department of Communications.

Upon graduation from Pepperdine University she made magazine history by becoming the youngest editor of the nationally published magazine, Right On! Over the years, as a celebrity journalist she has interviewed Michael Jackson, The Jacksons, Janet Jackson, Prince, Brandy, Queen Latifah, New Edition, Mariah Carey, Beyoncé, Destiny's Child, and hundreds of others. She is recipient of the Journalist of the Year Award from the International Association of African-American Music and has received numerous awards for her contribution to pop and urban culture.

Horner has contributed over two decades of service to the political community. Her father, the late Lawrence E. Horner, was the first African-American Mayor of Thousand Oaks, California, and was one of the highest-ranking African-American in the Conejo Valley's political community. Horner has participated in many voter education initiatives, provides mentorship and companionship to senior citizens, and is an advocate for children's literacy campaigns. She is a frequent guest speaker at elementary, junior high schools and high schools in the New York City school systems. As a role model for young people from all walks of life, Horner's ability to spark children's interest in the areas of reading and writing have had an indelible impact on the learning processes of impressionable generations.

Horner frequently makes appearances on talk shows, including the E Channel, BET, TV One and MTV, and is the co-author of several books, including the New York Times best seller, The Magic of Michael Jackson. She is a member of Sigma Gamma Rho sorority. Horner was honored as Sigma of the Year by her organization in 2001, and received the Sigma Image Award by the Sigma Gamma Rho's Northeast Region in 2002. She was also honored as Soror of the Year in May 2004 by the National Pan-Hellenic Council of New York City for her extensive community service and commitment to the Council.

In 2005, Horner formed her own entertainment company, Cynthia Horner's Independent Production Services (Cinnamon CHIPS), which is a media relations company under which she spearheads public relations projects, particularly in the non-profit sector, literary projects for herself and others, artist development, marketing and writing/editing projects for teen and adult music and general interest publications.

Horner has tutored young students for a number of years, has taught public relations at New York's The Learning Annex, lent assistance to the English Department for Long Island University, Brooklyn Campus, and has taught journalism at Essex County College in West Caldwell, New Jersey.

In addition she is the Publisher of Right On! Digital (https://rightondigital.com), Right On! magazine and Word Up!. Horner has contributed pieces to the National Enquirer, The Star, The Amsterdam News and others newsstand publications. She is one of the authors of "The Magic Of Michael Jackson," a NY Times Best Seller and has written various books which appeal to pop culture.

Horner is one of the founding editors and former Editor-in-Chief of Hip Hop Weekly magazine, a glossy celebrity weekly from the founders of the hip hop magazine, The Source, Dave Mays and Raymond "Benzino" Scott, that was founded in 2006.
