= Gent (magazine) =

American pornographic magazine

- Categories: Pornographic magazine
- Frequency: Monthly
- Founded: 1956; 70 years ago
- Company: Magna Publishing Group
- Country: United States
- Language: English
- Website: gentonline.com

Gent was a pornographic magazine published by the Magna Publishing Group, publisher of Swank, Genesis, Velvet and many other popular men's magazines. It focused on women with large breasts, and is subtitled "Home of the D-Cups".

== History ==
Begun in 1956 by Excellent Publications, Inc. as The Gent, it was one of a number of "skin magazine" startups at the time aimed at male readers in imitation of Playboy and hoping for similar success. It was soon prosecuted for obscenity by the United States Postal Service, but was found not obscene at that time. Skin magazines in general and Gent specifically proved to be a fiction market for popular writers like Harlan Ellison, one that was more open because it was "a little less constrained by fiction market formulas."

It was again prosecuted in New York State, but the New York State Court of Appeals ruled that since it was not hardcore pornography it could not be found to be obscene. The case has been described as "for a time and perhaps even now [in 2003], [...] the single most important obscenity case decided" by that court and "the focal point for addressing the issues of legal regulation of obscenity in New York." It was prosecuted again in Arkansas, where a jury convicted it, but the United States Supreme Court agreed to review the case, bundling it in Redrup v. New York.

It continued to be a market for popular fiction through the 1970s, 80s (then put out by Dugent Publishing Corp.) and 90s, publishing pieces such as "Strawberry Spring" by Stephen King. In later years, it was owned by the Princeton Media Group, publisher of other similar magazines such as Oui at which time it was derided by some as a "working-class Playboy wannabe", and overshadowed by the publicity surrounding Hustler publisher Larry Flynt.

Gent has ceased publication.
