= Leg Show =

American adult fetish magazine

- Categories: Pornographic magazine
- Frequency: 12 / year
- First issue: 1980s
- Final issue: August 2012
- Company: Mavety Media Group
- Country: United States
- Language: English

Leg Show was an adult fetish magazine published in the United States which specialized in photographs of women in nylons, corsets, pantyhose, stockings and high heels. The magazine features pinup style photographs and articles geared towards dominant women. The magazine achieved great success under editor Dian Hanson during the 1990s.

It was published by Mavety Media Group, which also published Juggs, Tight and Black Tail magazines.

A German edition, on the market since 1997, was published by Ediciones Zinco SA.

Leg Show is no longer being published, and the web sites for both the magazine and its publisher are now defunct. The last issue of Leg Show magazine was published in August 2012. The company ended production without any type of notification or refund to subscribers or advertisers.

== Bibliography ==
- William D. Brame, Jon Jacobs, Different loving: the world of sexual dominance and submission, Villard, 1996, ISBN 0-679-76956-0, pp. 358,368
- Joseph W. Slade, "Pornography and sexual representation: a reference guide", in Pornography and Sexual Representation vol. 3, Greenwood Publishing Group, 2001, ISBN 0-313-31521-3, pp. 404–411
- Vibe, August 1998, p. 48
