= Right On! (magazine) =

African-American teen magazine

- Editor-In-Chief/Publisher: Cynthia M. Horner
- Categories: African American pop culture, music
- Frequency: Monthly
- First issue: 1971
- Final issue: 2014 (print)
- Company: Right On! Media Holdings, LLC.
- Country: United States
- Based in: New York City
- Language: English
- Website: www.rightondigital.com
- ISSN: 0048-8305

Right On! is an American teen magazine first published by the Laufer Company in 1971. It was headquartered in New York City. It continued publishing on a regular basis until 2014, focusing on African-American celebrities. The magazine was acquired by Right On! Media Holdings, LLC in 2016, which promotes its digital platform, rightondigital.com and publishes select print titles.

== History and profile ==
The magazine's title was derived from the expression of positivity and featured exclusive coverage of The Jackson 5. Like Tiger Beat did with White American and Hispanic celebrities, Right On! covered everything and everyone African-American and involved in the entertainment business. It also offered readers a close-up look into the lives of such celebrities as the Soul Train Gang, The Sylvers, Black Ivory and many more.

During its early years, Right On! focused primarily on the lives and careers of The Jackson 5, featuring numerous interviews with each Jackson family member as well as Motown labelmates The Temptations and Diana Ross. In the 1980s Right On! was instrumental in the popularity of R&B teen group New Edition. Cynthia Horner is among the former editors-in-chief of the magazine and now serves as publisher/CEO of its print titles and digital property.
