= Beaver Hunt =

Pornographic magazine aimed at men

- Editor: Larry Flynt
- Categories: Pornographic men's
- Frequency: periodically
- Circulation: under 500,000
- First issue: circa 1979
- Company: LFP Inc
- Country: United States
- Language: English
- Website: www.beaverhunt.com

Beaver Hunt is a pornographic magazine aimed at men and published in the United States. It was first published in 1979 by Larry Flynt. It was an offshoot of Hustler magazines's popular running feature, "Beaver Hunt", which first appeared in the July 1976 issue of Hustler magazine. The feature became so popular that Larry Flynt decided to create a magazine featuring only reader-submitted photos. Beaver is used as a sexual term for the human vulva.

Though the title of the magazine has changed somewhat over the years (Hustler Beaver Hunt, The Best of Hustler Beaver Hunt, Hustler Best of Beaver Hunt), several times a year LFP Publishes Best of Beaver Hunt featuring standout pictorials previously seen in the pages of Hustler.

== Publisher ==
Beaver Hunt is officially published by LFP, Inc, which is controlled by Flynt. "L.F.P." is the abbreviation for "Larry Flynt Publications."

== Websites ==
The LFP Internet Group, LLC, operates BeaverHunt.com and a number of related sites, where it sells pictures and videos with content similar to that in its magazines.

== See also ==
- List of men's magazines
- List of pornographic magazines
