= Genesis (magazine) =

Pornographic magazine

- Categories: Pornographic magazine
- Frequency: monthly
- First issue: 1973; 53 years ago
- Company: Magna Publishing Group
- Country: United States
- Language: English

Genesis is a men's pornographic magazine which began publication in 1973. It exclusively features female stars of the adult film industry. Branding itself as "The Home of Porn's Hottest Stars", Genesis features pictorials, exclusive columns by adult film stars, interviews, feature articles, movie reviews and news. It is published by the Magna Publishing Group, which also publishes Swank, Gent, Velvet, and many other popular men's magazines.

Genesis features masthead publisher Tera Patrick and has had columnists including adult film stars Houston, Jasmin St. Claire, Mari Possa, Carmen Luvana, Tyler Faith and The Love Twins. L. Fletcher Prouty served as the Washington, D.C. editor.

Genesis is also known for its amateur erotic photo contest, "Sex Star Hunt" (which was formerly known as "Friends and Lovers"). The magazine publishes an annual list of rankings of the top adult film stars entitled "Porn's Hot 100" and is the co-creator and producer of the annual F.A.M.E. Awards held each year in Los Angeles as part of the Erotica LA convention.

== History ==
In August 1973, Hiroaki Aoki launched Genesis, as a softcore pornographic men's magazine, with two centerfolds each issue. The title changed hands several times, eventually becoming an explicit publication long after Aoki's period of ownership.

Marilyn Chambers wrote a sex advice column in the mid-to-late 1970s for Genesis called "Private Chambers".

Charlene Keel interviewed Frank Zappa for Genesis, April 1979.
