= Newboro, Ontario =

Unincorporated community in Ontario, Canada

Coordinates: 44.650287°N 76.319731°W

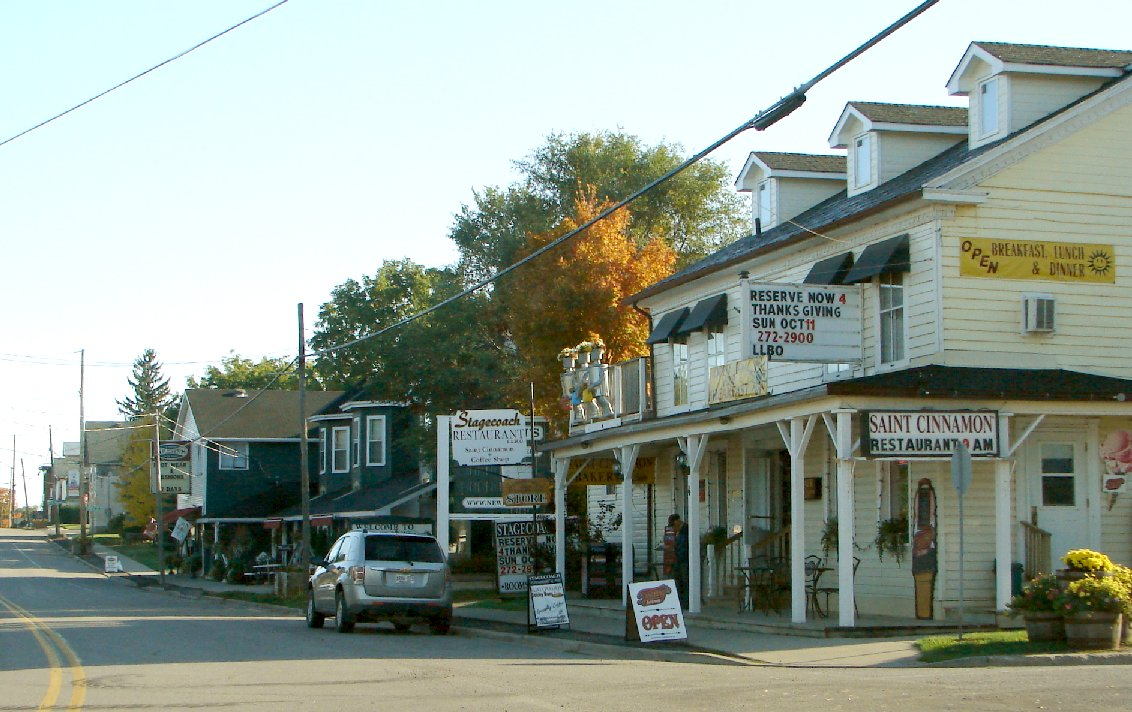
Newboro (Rideau Lakes Township), Ontario, Canada

Newboro is an unincorporated community in Ontario, Canada. It is recognized as a designated place by Statistics Canada.

== Demographics ==
In the 2021 Census of Population conducted by Statistics Canada, Newboro had a population of 262 living in 123 of its 160 total private dwellings, a change of 4.4% from its 2016 population of 251. With a land area of 4.81 km^{2} (1.86 sq mi), it had a population density of 54.5/km^{2} (141.1/sq mi) in 2021.

== See also ==
- List of communities in Ontario
- List of designated places in Ontario
