= Larry Flynt Publications =

American adult entertainment businesses

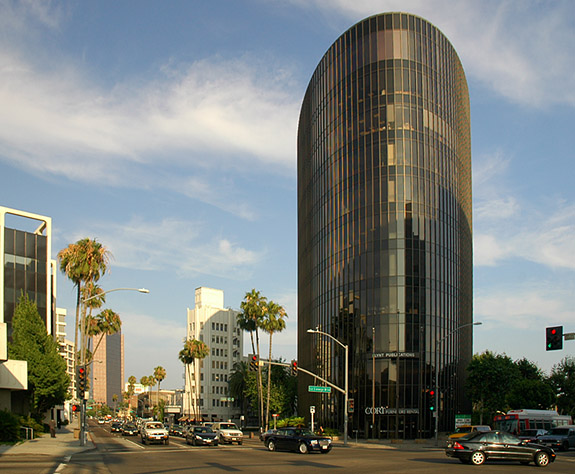
- LFP headquarters on Wilshire Boulevard
- Type: Private
- Industry: magazine publishing; adult entertainment
- Founded: 1976; 50 years ago
- Founder: Larry Flynt
- Headquarters: Beverly Hills, California, United States
- Area served: Worldwide
- Key people: Larry Flynt, CEO/President
- Products: adult video; pornographic magazines; retailing
- Owner: Larry Flynt
- Divisions: Hustler; Hustler Video; Hustler Hollywood; Hustler Club

Larry Flynt Publications, or LFP, Inc. is an American independent business enterprise that owns, manages and operates the adult entertainment businesses founded by American entrepreneur Larry Flynt. Founded in 1976, two years after Flynt began publishing Hustler magazine, LFP was originally established to serve as the legal business entity i.e. parent company of this magazine.

== Hustler magazine ==
In March 1972, Flynt created the Hustler Newsletter, a four-page, black-and-white publication of information about his Hustler Clubs. This item became so popular with his customers that by May 1972 he expanded the Hustler Newsletter to 16 pages and in August 1973, to 32 pages.

As a result of the 1973 oil crisis the United States entered an economic recession; Hustler Club customers tightened their spending and Flynt had to find financing to pay his debts or go bankrupt. He decided to turn the Hustler Newsletter into a sexually-explicit national magazine. He paid the start-up costs of the new magazine using sales taxes collected in the clubs.

In July 1974, the first issue of Hustler magazine was published. Although the first few issues went largely unnoticed, within a year it became highly lucrative and he was able to pay his tax debts.

The magazine struggled for the first year, partly because many distributors and wholesalers refused to handle it as its nude photos became increasingly graphic. It targeted working-class men and grew from a shaky start to a peak circulation of around 3 million (current circulation is below 500,000). In November 1974, Hustler showed the first "pink shots", or photos of open vulvas. Flynt had to fight to publish each issue as many people, including his distribution company, found the magazine too sexually explicit and threatened to have it removed from the market.

Shortly thereafter, Flynt was approached by a paparazzo who had taken nude pictures of former First Lady Jacqueline Kennedy Onassis while she was sunbathing on vacation in 1971. He purchased them for $18,000 and published them in the August 1975 issue. That issue attracted widespread attention, and one million copies were sold within a few days. As a millionaire, he bought a $375,000 (1976 dollars) mansion.

== Other magazines ==
After 1976, Larry Flynt Publications began publishing many pornographic magazine titles as well as mainstream ones. Other pornographic magazines included:

- Hustler's Taboo, which specializes in fetishistic material, such as the depiction of sexual bondage and urolagnia
- Barely Legal, a primarily softcore magazine focusing on models between 18 and 23
- Hustler XXX, a more generic hardcore offering
- Hustler Beaver Hunt, featuring amateurs and reader-submitted photos
- Hustler's Leg World
- Asian Fever, focusing on Asian models
- Hustler's Chic Magazine, started in 1976 and aimed at a more upscale clientele than Hustler
- Hustler's Busty Beauties is a softcore magazine which specializes in photographs of women with extremely large breasts.

When sales of men's magazines fell in the late 1990s, LFP expanded into production of adult videos through its Hustler Video subsidiary, and moved further into the mainstream publishing market. To accommodate this expansion, the company moved its headquarters to Wilshire Boulevard in Beverly Hills, California, where it remains to this day. It acquired Darkroom Photography (later known as Camera & Darkroom Photography) in 1988 and launched a series of special-interest magazines, such as PC Laptop Computers and Maternity Fashion & Beauty.

Rip Magazine was a music magazine covering heavy metal music. It was the first non-pornographic publication produced by LFP, and was edited by Lonn Friend, who had previously edited Hustler and Chic. Former Hustler associate art director Craig Jones was RIP's original art director from its inception until his departure 8 years later in 1994. Writers included rock journalist Judy Wieder, Mick Wall, and Andy Secher.

It published 14 bi-monthly issues of TurboPlay Magazine (June/July 1990 – August/September 1992) dedicated to covering TurboGrafx-16 and TG-CD hardware and software. It was a spin-off publication of Video Games & Computer Entertainment (VG&CE), a popular multi-platform gaming magazine of the late 1980s / early 1990s. Every issue of TurboPlay was 32 pages in length and a yearly subscription cost $9.95. L.F.P. published three bi-monthly issues of DUOWORLD magazine (July/August 1993 – November/December 1993) before it was canceled. DuoWorld was very similar in format to TurboPlay, but with a focus on the newly released TurboDuo console (i.e. TurboMail and TurboNews became DuoMail and DuoNews, respectively).

Tips & Tricks (later Tips & Tricks Codebook) is a video game magazine published by LFP. For most of its existence, the publication was devoted almost exclusively to strategies and codes for popular video games. It began as a spin-off from VideoGames magazine, which in itself morphed out of VideoGames & Computer Entertainment. VG&CE and VideoGames, like Tips & Tricks, were published by LFP following the purchase of ANALOG Computing, ST-LOG and other computer magazines from publishers Michael DesChenes & Lee Pappas in the late 1980s.

LFP purchased Big Brother Skateboarding Magazine from Steve Rocco in 1997, and published the magazine until 2004. 1997 Big Brother Skateboarding Magazine is notable for being one of the precursors to the Jackass franchise of extreme stunts and pranks.

As the 21st century approached, magazine sales further declined. Together, the company's 31 periodicals had a monthly circulation of between 2.5 and 3 million. This was a far cry from the 1970s, when Hustler alone sold that many copies each month. Because of this LFP focused on turning its magazine and video titles such as Hustler, Barely Legal, Busty Beauties, Beaver Hunt, and Asian Fever into profitable websites.

By 1998, estimates LFP was doing $135 million in annual sales with 51,112 periodicals published and 7,812 movies and or video tapes produced.

== Hustler Video ==
Hustler Video is a pornographic film studio owned by LFP. In 2003 Hustler Video bought VCA Pictures, which maintains a separate brand identity within the LFP conglomerate. Hustler Video has produced several top-selling and award-winning films, such as Snoop Dogg's Doggystyle, Snoop Dogg's Hustlaz: Diary of a Pimp and Who's Nailin' Paylin?.

In 2010 when AIDS Healthcare Foundation lodged a complaint against the Hustler Video group for not requiring the actors to wear condoms and thereby contributing to the spread of HIV, Michael H. Klein, the President of LFP responded by saying the company would not back down from shooting raw sex videos.

== Hustler Clubs ==
The Hustler Club is a chain of strip clubs. In 1968, Flynt opened the first Hustler Club which featured semi-clothed girls. One Hustler Club in Dayton quickly lead to a chain of clubs with the same name in Cincinnati, Columbus, Cleveland, Toledo, and Akron. By early 1970, he had eight clubs and 300 employees. In 1974 with profits from Hustler magazine far surpassing those of the Hustler Clubs, Flynt decided to get out of the bars business and be a publisher full-time. For close to 30 years the Hustler Club name lay dormant. In the early 2000s (decade), LFP began to license the Hustler Club name for new clubs across the country. Currently there are Hustler Clubs in 6 U.S. states and 3 countries.
