= Dian Hanson =

American magazine and book editor (born 1951)

Dian Hanson (born November 2, 1951) is an American magazine and book editor.

== Career ==
Hanson began her publishing career as an American pornographic magazine editor, historian, and occasional model, helping found the 1970s hardcore journal Puritan, then moving on to Partner, OUI, Adult Cinema Review, Outlaw Biker and Big Butt, among others. She was most famously the editor of Juggs and Leg Show sexual fetish magazines from 1987 to 2001.

Since 2001 Hanson has held the position of Sexy Book editor for art book publisher, Taschen, based in Cologne, Germany, in which capacity she writes or edits all the sexually oriented titles for the company. Recent books include Vanessa del Rio: 50 Years of Slightly Slutty Behavior and The Big Penis Book. In an interview with magazine The Believer, Hanson speaks of her introduction to Benedikt Taschen in the early 1990s, and how she came to work for the publisher:

"I was editing Leg Show and Juggs, and Benedikt Taschen was my biggest German fan. He contacted me in 1993 or ‘94 and wanted to meet. He would come to New York and take me out to dinner and say, 'When are you going to work for me?' I would say, 'Never. I want to keep doing what I’m doing. I love pornography.' I didn’t mean to be a tease. I was just being honest. But he took it as a great challenge...The magazine field had been declining since 1997, and my publisher died in 2000. I love magazines, but I knew that change would come at some point. I had always known that Benedikt was going to be my future."

== Books ==
Hanson published her edited erotic photography work The Big Butt Book in 2010, tracing the cultural history of the buttocks.

Other books:

- The Big Book of Breasts (2006)
- Big Book of Pussy (2011)
- The New Erotic Photography 1. (2013)
- The New Erotic Photography 2. (2012)
- The New Erotic Photography (2009, extended edition: 2017)

== General references ==
- Sella, Marshall (2019-04-11). "The Soho Love Goddess". New York Magazine.
- (in Italian) "Dian Hanson". TRAX (in Italian).
- Ebert, Roger (November 20, 2005). "Crumb: Eccentricity at its most extreme". Chicago Sun Times. Archived from the original on 2011-01-08.
- "Dian Hanson", by Michelle Golden, Index Magazine, 2002. Also at Index Magazine site Retrieved 2007-08-08.
- Bowman, David (April 11, 2003). "When nudists swung". Salon.com. Archived from the original on August 8, 2007. Interview about Hanson's book Naked as a Jaybird.
- Frainie, Mike; Russell, Lia; Rasmussen, Frederick N.; Kelly, Jacques; Mirabella, Lorraine; Broadwater, Luke; Paper, Baltimore City (2024-01-23). "Baltimore City Paper – Baltimore Sun". Baltimore Sun. Archived from the original on 2023-12-01.
