= Celebrity Skin (magazine) =

American pornographic magazine

- Categories: Pornographic magazine
- Frequency: 12 / year
- Founded: 1986
- Country: United States
- Based in: New York City
- Language: English

Celebrity Skin was a pornographic magazine which specializes in showcasing images, either photographs or movie and TV screencaps, of nude or semi-nude celebrities. It is not to be confused with its rival Celebrity Sleuth. The magazine has ceased publication.

== Origin ==
Celebrity Skin was a spin-off publication of High Society magazine first published in 1986. Editor Gloria Leonard is credited with the idea to publish revealing or scandalous images of celebrities in the magazine. The success and increased sales of issues with "celebrity skin" led to the new publication.

== Lawsuits ==
Over the course of its run, Margot Kidder, Ann-Margret and Barbra Streisand unsuccessfully attempted to sue the magazine after it published nude photos of them.

=== Jennifer Aniston ===
The September 1999 issue of Celebrity Skin contained photographs of Jennifer Aniston sunbathing topless in her back garden. The photographs also appeared in the December 1999 issues of High Society and Celebrity Sleuth. The April 1999 issues of the Italian magazine Eva Tremila and the British newspaper, the Daily Sport carried the pictures, as well as the May 31–June 6 issue of the French publication Voici. Aniston filed a lawsuit against Francois Naverre, who took the photos in February 1999. Aniston also filed suit against Man's World Publications and Crescent Publishing Group for publishing the photos.

Crescent was charged by the United States government in 2000 with illegally billing for website access that was advertised as "free", and for billing others who had never visited the websites. The websites included www.playgirl.com and www.highsociety.com.

== In popular culture ==
- Alternative rock group, Hole, released "Celebrity Skin" as the title track and first single off their third studio album, Celebrity Skin.
- In a scene of the Jim Carrey movie Me, Myself and Irene the albino character Casper can be seen reading Celebrity Skin.
- In the episode "Blood" of The X-Files, Fox Mulder makes a reference to the magazine.
- In the movie Road Trip, the motel clerk (Andy Dick) reads an issue of Celebrity Skin magazine with Drew Barrymore on the cover.

== See also ==
- Mr. Skin
