= Gallery (magazine) =

Pornographic men's magazine

- Categories: Men's magazines
- Frequency: Monthly
- Publisher: Magna Publishing Group
- Founder: Ronald L. Fenton
- Founded: 1969
- First issue: November 1972
- Country: United States
- Language: English, many others
- ISSN: 0195-072X

Gallery is an adult sex magazine published by Magna Publishing Group. It is one of the more popular "skin" magazines that arose on the Playboy magazine pattern in the 1970s.

== Publication history ==
Gallery was launched by Ronald L. Fenton and trial attorney F. Lee Bailey in Chicago, Illinois. The first issue appeared on newsstands in November, 1972 bearing an uncanny resemblance to Playboy magazine, even using the same style font for the cover. Many people therefore assumed Gallery was also published by Hugh Hefner as a companion publication to Playboy. After Hefner sent a letter to Bailey pointing out the magazine's many similarities, the layout of Gallery was quickly changed.

Financial difficulties plagued the magazine from the start, causing Bailey to leave during its inaugural year. Following publication of the January 1974 issue, Fenton was forced to forfeit ownership of the magazine to its distributor.

Montcalm Publications, based in New York, eventually acquired Gallery and added it to its portfolio of periodicals. Montcalm also published The Twilight Zone Magazine in the 1980s, apparently in imitation of Penthouse magazine's offshoot Omni.

Montcalm Publishing went bankrupt in March 2008, owing many photographers and models unpaid wages; some were owed as much as $100,000.

On April 30, 2008, Gallery magazine was purchased by the Magna Publishing Group. On December 22, 2015, Magna Publishing Group was acquired by 1-800-PHONESEX.

== Articles ==
In addition to pornographic content, Gallery also published articles related to current events and JFK assassination conspiracy theories, most notably by L. Fletcher Prouty.

- Prouty, L. Fletcher. "The Betrayal of JFK Kept Fidel Castro in Power: The Second in a Series of Investigative Reports".
- Prouty, L. Fletcher. "An Introduction to the Assassination Business". September 1975.
- Prouty, L. Fletcher. "The Guns of Dallas". October 1975.
- Prouty, L. Fletcher. "The United States Military Consists of the Army, The Air Force, The Navy and Marines, and The Fourth Force". December 1975.
- Prouty, L. Fletcher. "The Guns of Dallas: Update". May 1976.
- Prouty, L. Fletcher. "The Umbrella Man". May 1976.
- Prouty, L. Fletcher. "Indonesia 1958: Nixon, the CIA, and the Secret War ". August 1976.
- Prouty, L. Fletcher. *"The Sabotaging of the American Presidency". January 1978.

== Features and format ==
Gallery has long featured a "Girl Next Door" contest in which photographers submit pictures of amateur models (similar to Hustler's "Beaver Hunt.") From each group of monthly entries, one model winner is selected. At the end of the year, one is crowned "Girl Next Door of the Year" and awarded a cash prize of $25,000. The most famous winner is retired porn star Stacy Valentine; at the time of her selection she was Oklahoma housewife Stacy Baker.

Between 1980 and 1983 Gallery published 37 original mystery short stories by Isaac Asimov (see The Union Club Mysteries).
