= Swank (magazine) =

American pornographic magazine

- Swank, August 1976
- Categories: Pornographic magazine
- Frequency: 6/year
- Founded: 1941
- Company: Magna Publishing Group
- Country: United States
- Language: English
- Website: www.swankmag.com

Swank is an American pornographic magazine published bi-monthly by Magna Publishing Group. The first incarnation was launched by Victor Fox of Fox Comics in 1941 (and again in 1945) as a men's lifestyle and pin-up magazine in the style of Esquire. Around 1954–1955, it was relaunched by Martin Goodman, the founder of Marvel Comics, and ran spicy adventure or suspense fiction by the likes of Ian Fleming, Graham Greene, Norman Mailer and Arthur C. Clarke. Humorist Bruce Jay Friedman was an editor in the late 1950s.

Along with its sister title, Stag, the magazine was bought by the Magna Publishing Group in 1993. Following that acquisition, the format of Swank changed to include hardcore sex, such as the use of sex toys, lesbian sex, and sexual intercourse between men and women. There are also a series of DVDs and an official website produced under the Swank name. Magna Publishing Group was bought by 1-800-PHONESEX in 2015.

== History ==
According to its current owner, Magna Publishing Group, Swank has been established for "well over 65 years". A men's lifestyle title called Swank was launched in the early 1940s, by Victor Fox. In a 2002 article for The New York Times, Matthew Flamm wrote of the magazine's genesis: "[Swank] can even draw a line to the same pulp publishing outfit – Martin Goodman's Magazine Management Company – that in 1939 started the comic book publisher that eventually became Marvel Comics, and that in the 1950s and 1960s employed future novelists like Mario Puzo and Bruce Jay Friedman as writers and editors." Beat poet John Fles also wrote for the magazine. In keeping with its connection to Magazine Management, in the early 1970s Swank ran a three-page comics section that was created by Vaughn Bodē, and continued by Bernie Wrightson and then Jeff Jones.

During its first two decades of operation, Swank had breaks in publication lasting up to several years. The original format was similar to that of the popular men's title Esquire. Magazine archivist Phil Stephensen-Payne gives the date of the first issue as August 1941 and suggests that, after perhaps seven issues, the publication folded and then relaunched in August 1945. Humphrey Bogart, Oscar Levant and Earl Wilson were among the guest contributors over this period.

A later incarnation celebrated its 20th birthday on the cover of the October 1977 issue. By that time, the content included music-related feature articles by journalist and author Michael Gross.

The Magna Publishing Group bought Swank, along with titles including Stag magazine, in 1993. The previous owner was Charles "Chip" Goodman, the son of Martin Goodman. At the time of the purchase, the company was known as Swank Publications and was part of the GCR Publishing Group, which also published non-pornographic magazines such as New Body and Victorian Accents.

In the 1958 Alfred Hitchcock film Vertigo, a copy of Swank magazine can be seen on the coffee table at James Stewart's character's apartment after he returns there with Kim Novak's character after rescuing her from San Francisco Bay (clearest at 44' 30").
