= Queer Japan =

2019 documentary film

- Film festival poster
- Directed by: Graham Kolbeins
- Written by: Anne Ishii; Graham Kolbeins
- Produced by: Hiromi Iida; Anne Ishii
- Cinematography: John Roney; Graham Kolbeins
- Edited by: Graham Kolbeins
- Music by: Geotic
- Production company: HIROMEDIA8
- Distributed by: Altered Innocence
- Release date: July 15, 2019 (Rainbow Reel Tokyo)
- Running time: 99 minutes
- Countries: United States; Japan
- Languages: Japanese; English

Queer Japan (Japanese: クィア・ジャパン) is a 2019 documentary film directed, edited, and co-written by Graham Kolbeins. The documentary profiles a range of individuals in Japan who identify as lesbian, gay, bisexual, transgender, and queer (LGBTQ). Queer Japan is produced by Hiromi Iida with Anne Ishii, written by Ishii and Kolbeins, and features an original score composed by Geotic (a stage name of Will Wiesenfeld, also known as Baths).

== Synopsis and cast ==
Queer Japan is an ensemble film that profiles a range of artists, academics, community organizers, and activists who are members of the LGBTQ community in Japan. Kolbeins has described the film as "a series of character studies," rather than an issue-focused documentary. Over one hundred interviews were conducted for Queer Japan over the course of four years, with interviews conducted in Tokyo, Osaka, Kobe, Gunma, and Okinawa. Subjects are listed alphabetically by last name:

- Akira the Hustler, artist
- Kaoru Aoyama, sociologist at Kobe University
- Simone Fukayuki, drag queen
- Hiroshi Hasegawa, HIV activist and co-founder of G-men
- Tomato Hatakeno, transgender rights activist
- Aya Kamikawa, first openly transgender elected official in Japan
- Leslie Kee, photographer
- Margarette, organizer of Department H
- Atsushi Matsuda, Butoh dancer
- Masaki C. Matsumoto, YouTuber (QueerESL)
- Junko Mitsuhashi, historian at Meiji University
- Chiga Ogawa, owner of Bar Goldfinger
- Tetsuro Onitsuka, professor at Kyoto Sangyo University
- Saeborg, performance artist
- Vivienne Sato, drag queen
- Fumino Sugiyama, transgender rights activist
- Nogi Sumiko, multimedia artist
- Hideki Sunagawa, writer and activist
- Gengoroh Tagame, manga artist and co-founder of G-men
- Lily Taiga, activist
- Fuyumi Yamamoto, activist

Rokudenashiko was interviewed for Queer Japan, though she does not appear in the film's final cut.

== Production ==
Kolbeins conceived of Queer Japan in 2011 while traveling to Japan to research two books he co-edited with Anne Ishii and Chip Kidd: The Passion of Gengoroh Tagame, the first English-language publication of works by Gengoroh Tagame, and Massive: Gay Erotic Manga and the Men Who Make It, the first English-language anthology of gay manga. The books led Kolbeins and Ishii to found Massive Goods, a fashion brand and manga publisher that works with LGBTQ artists in Japan. As Kolbeins met LGBTQ artists and individuals through his work with Massive, he began to produce a documentary to highlight their stories, stating that he wished to "give a voice to the everyday experiences of queer people without sensationalizing them. I want to meet people who are living examples of resisting patriarchy and dismantling heteronormativity, but also those who are simply bravely living their lives in an honest and unabashed way."

In 2015, Kolbeins traveled to Japan to shoot a pre-production trailer for the film. Production of Queer Japan was crowdfunded through a Kickstarter campaign launched by Kolbeins on February 11, 2016; the campaign would go on to raise $47,193. The film's production and post-production would ultimately be funded through a combination of Kickstarter pledges, a GoFundMe, and a fellowship from the Japan-US Friendship Fund.

== Release ==
In-progress previews of Queer Japan were screened at the International House of Japan in Tokyo on May 10, 2016, and at Japan Society in New York on March 31, 2017. The film was an official selection for Rainbow Reel Tokyo, where it had its world premiere on July 15, 2019. The film has also screened at Outfest, Reel Affirmations, the Vancouver Queer Film Festival, the Hong Kong Lesbian & Gay Film Festival, the Camera Japan Festival, the Seattle Queer Film Festival, the New York Lesbian, Gay, Bisexual, & Transgender Film Festival, the Beijing Queer Film Festival, the Ljubljana LGBT Film Festival, and the Philadelphia Asian American Film Festival.

On October 22, 2019, Altered Innocence acquired North American distribution rights for Queer Japan. The film was released on video on demand on December 11, 2020.

== Reception ==
Reviews of Queer Japan have been favorable. The Hollywood Reporter called the film "an engagingly colorful panorama," noting that the film is "impressionistic rather than highly structured" in its focus on individuals rather than the broader historical and political context of LGBT rights in Japan. Owen Gleiberman shared a similar sentiment in his review of Queer Japan for Variety, praising the film but noting that it "often feels like an extended public-service announcement [...] the legacy of homosexual life in Japan comes with its own traditions and iconic figures. I wish that Queer Japan had delved more into historical matters of fashion and androgyny."
