= List of hentai creators =

Hentai (Japanese: ヘンタイ) is a style of Japanese pornographic anime and manga. In addition to anime and manga, hentai works exist in a variety of media, including artwork and video games (commonly known as eroge).

== Individuals ==
- Amy Yamada
- Benkyo Tamaoki
- Carnelian
- Gai Mizuki
- Gengoroh Tagame
- Henmaru Machino
- Hiroyuki Utatane
- Isutoshi
- Jiraiya
- Joe Phillips
- Johji Manabe
- Jun Maeda
- Keito Koume
- Kouta Hirano
- Masamune Shirow
- Meimu
- Nozomu Tamaki
- Oh! great
- Okama
- Projekt Melody
- Rei Hiroe
- Rin Shin
- Sakimichan
- Satoshi Urushihara
- Senno Knife
- Shōji Satō
- Takahiro
- Takeshi Matsu
- Teruo Kakuta
- Toshihiro Ono
- Toshiki Yui
- Toshio Maeda
- U-Jin
- Yasuomi Umetsu
- Yū Asagiri

== See also ==
- List of hentai anime
