= Our Colors =

Manga series by Gengoroh Tagame

- Cover of the first collected edition

僕らの色彩 (Bokura no Shikisai)
- Genre: Drama
- Manga
- Written by: Gengoroh Tagame
- Published by: Futabasha
- English publisher: Pantheon Books
- Magazine: Monthly Action
- Original run: March 24, 2018 – May 25, 2020
- Volumes: 3

Our Colors (Japanese: 僕らの色彩, Hepburn: Bokura no Shikisai) is a Japanese manga series written and illustrated by Gengoroh Tagame. It was serialized in Futabasha's Monthly Action magazine from March 2018 to May 2020 and collected into three tankōbon volumes. Our Colors is Tagame's second manga for general audiences, following his 2014 series My Brother's Husband. The series follows Sora Itoda, a closeted second-year high school student, who is alienated by the homophobia of his peers and the pressures of needing to pass as straight. One day, Sora meets an older man who runs a cafe, and learns that the man is also gay. The series follows the intergenerational friendship that forms between Sora and the man, and the mentorship the man provides Sora on the problems he is facing.

== Plot ==
Sora Itoda, a closeted second-year high school art student, is alienated by the homophobia of his peers and the pressures of needing to pass as straight. One day, distressed by his schoolmates' casual homophobic jokes, Sora skips class and flees to the beachfront, lying down and closing his eyes. He suddenly overhears an older man say to him that he always wanted to tell him that he loved him. Startled, Sora sits up, but the man has disappeared. He later finds a small cafe in an old residence and is surprised to find that the older man is its proprietor. The man behaves as though nothing happened and Sora leaves. Nao Nakamura, Sora's childhood friend, notices that he has been behaving strangely and asks him what is wrong, but he brushes her off. When a female classmate asks Sora out on a date, he panics and rejects her. Realizing that being closeted may mean he will always have to lie to people and hide his feelings, he flees to the cafe and confronts the owner. The owner admits that he thought Sora was asleep and that Sora reminded him of someone from his past. The man introduces himself as Shirow Amamiya. Sora confesses to him that he is also gay, which Nao, who followed him, overhears. Sora and Nao talk and Nao is supportive, but worried about offending him while also struggling to sort out her own feelings for Sora. Sora brings her to meet Amamiya and the three treat the cafe as a secret sanctuary, where Sora feels finally free to live his truth. The three become friends and Nao suggests that Amamiya commission Sora to paint a mural to help liven up the cafe's profile. Both Sora and Nao ruminate on the pressure of being closeted, and having to deal with society's assumptions of being straight, compared with Amamiya's decision to live openly. The two regularly seek advice from Amamiya, who helps Sora think through how to approach future decisions he will have to make about being open with others, such as in pursuing relationships.

One day, while Sora is working on the mural, an older woman enters the cafe and causes a scene with Amamiya. She reveals herself to be his ex-wife, Yuko. She asks if Amamiya is having an inappropriate relationship with Sora, embarrassing them both in front of his customers. She leaves and requests that Amamiya meet her at her hotel to talk. Sora is distressed to learn that Amamiya has a complicated past, and it clouds his feelings about his own future. Meanwhile, Nao decides to seek out Amamiya and remembers the hotel address. She overhears Amamiya and Yuko discussing their situation. Yuko has difficulty finalizing the divorce papers and Amamiya states that leaving so that they could both live freely seemed best. He assures her that he takes responsibility for their situation, before leaving. Yuko announces that she knows that Nao has been eavesdropping and invites her to sit with her. She explains that they had an arranged marriage and that Amamiya was always a caring husband. Though she never believed Amamiya to have cheated on her, part of her difficulty accepting his sexuality was the feeling that he might regret wasting his life on their marriage. Meanwhile, Yoshioka, Sora's classmate and crush, asks Sora to join him on a trip to the aquarium and Sora is delighted to go on a "date" with him. They have a good time, though it ends awkwardly with Yoshioka giving him a gravure image of a female model Sora claimed to like.

Sora's mother goes to lunch with some friends, who turn out to be patrons of the cafe who witnessed Yuko's accusations against Amamiya. Realizing that this is the same cafe that Sora is painting the mural for, she and Sora's father confront him about whether he should be spending time with someone "like that." Furious at the mischaracterization of Amamiya, Sora angrily blurts out that he is gay, too. His parents are surprised, but listen to him sincerely as he explains his feelings. His parents are accepting of him and his mother speaks with him privately, assuring him that she was worried that Amamiya was a person of poor character for allegedly abandoning his wife, rather than because he is gay. Sora explains the truth and she is satisfied, assuring him that she will always be his ally. Sora returns to the cafe, and Amamiya is relieved, thinking he might not come back. They talk about Sora telling his parents and Amamiya praises Sora for being braver than he was, telling him about his own struggles with choosing not to come out to his parents. Sora tells him that he was only able to do these things because of the confidence he gained from meeting Amamiya. Nao arrives and Sora prepares to continue work on the mural the next day. However, a hurricane strikes the town. Unable to reach Amamiya, both Nao and Sora worry that something may have happened. Sora runs to the cafe the next day and finds the cafe's building collapsed. Amamiya is unharmed, and Sora is relieved. They walk up to the beachfront where they first met and Amamiya reflects on whether his desire to live a new life was foolish and whether his life would have been different if he had the courage years ago to confess his love to the other boy he knew. Sora tells him that meeting him has changed his life, and Amamiya resolves not to have any regrets, even though he will miss the three of them spending time together with the cafe gone.

The new school year begins and Sora prepares work for an art show. Nao asks if Amamiya will attend. Sora says he's not sure, as Amamiya has been quite busy, and he has not seen Amamiya since that day. He reflects on what else happened that day: while at the beachfront, Sora asks Amamiya to kiss him, saying he wants a special memory of someone who changed his life so deeply. Amamiya is surprised, but agrees. After they kiss, Sora tells Amamiya that he is confident that he will be alright even without the cafe as a sanctuary. Likewise, Amamiya tells Sora that he is his first gay friend, someone whom he could connect with in an honest way. The two affirm that they will always be special to one another due to how they have helped each other. As Sora prepares his artwork for the show, he reflects on his experiences as colors—the color of the sky and the ocean the day he met Amamiya, Nao's dress, Yoshioka's jersey, and his first kiss, and wonders what his next piece of artwork will look like.

== Production ==
Series creator Gengoroh Tagame, a manga artist famously known for creating hardcore BDSM gay manga, began creating all-ages material in 2014 with his manga series My Brother's Husband. Tagame has stated that the experience of creating My Brother's Husband made him "realize how much fun [all-ages manga] is to draw," saying that balancing the creation of erotic works with the simultaneous creation of all-ages works was "very healthy for me, mentally."

Our Colors is Tagame's second all-ages work following My Brother's Husband. Tagame stated that the series was inspired by his desire to create a story about gay characters that was not centrally focused on romance or sex; further, he wished to create a story that focused on a gay protagonist, in contrast to the straight protagonist of My Brother's Husband.

== Release ==
Our Colors was announced in February 2018 by publisher Futabasha in the manga magazine Monthly Action, and began serialization in Monthly Action on March 24, 2018. Its final chapter was published in the July issue of Monthly Action on May 25, 2020. The series has been collected into three tankōbon volumes published by Futabasha.

An English-language translation of Our Colors was released by Pantheon Books as a single omnibus edition on June 21, 2022. Internationally, the series is published in France as Our Colorful Days by Akata Éditions, and published in Germany as Unsere Farben by Carlsen.

No.	Original release date	Original ISBN	English release date	English ISBN
1	January 12, 2019	978-4-575-85255-4	June 21, 2022	978-1524748562
2	October 11, 2019	978-4-575-85360-5	June 21, 2022	978-1524748562
3	September 12, 2020	978-4-575-85490-9	June 21, 2022	978-1524748562
