= Anne Ishii =

American writer and translator

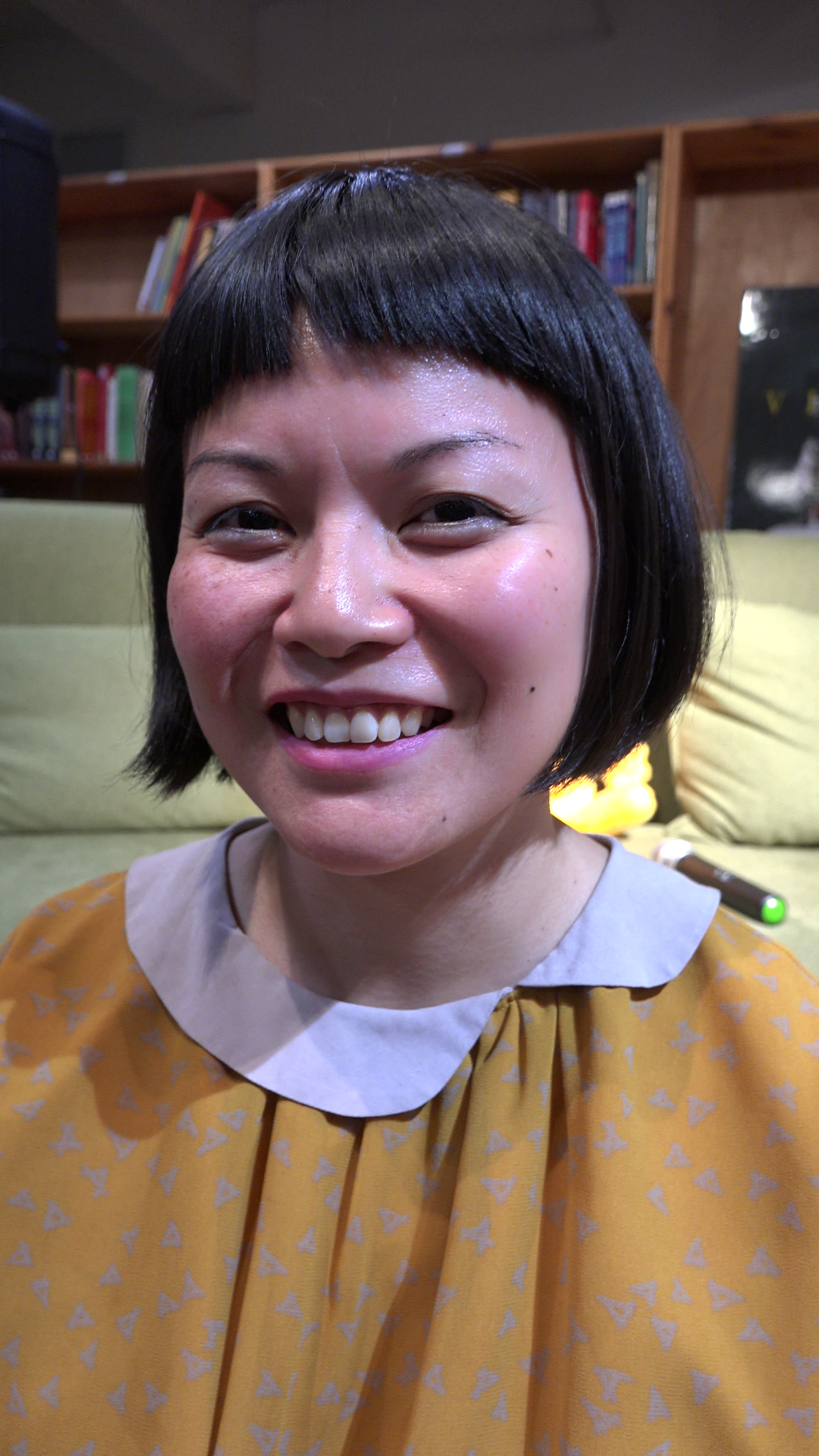
Ishii in 2016

Anne Ishii is an American writer, editor, translator, and producer based in Philadelphia. Ishii is the host of WHYY's Movers & Makers, and was the Executive Director of Philadelphia's Asian Arts Initiative, an arts non-profit until 2024. In June 2026, she was appointed director of grantmaking programs at The Pew Center for Arts & Heritage, after serving as Program Officer at United States Artists.

== Producer ==
Ishii is a producer of bara manga. Her work includes The Passion of Gengoroh Tagame: Master of Gay Erotic Manga, and Massive: Gay Japanese Manga and the Men Who Make It, edited alongside Graham Kolbeins, featuring manga artists Gengoroh Tagame, Jiraiya, Seizoh Ebisubashi, Kazuhide Ichikawa, Inu Yoshi, Takeshi Matsu, Gai Mizuki and Poosukeh Kumada, with artwork by Chip Kidd. In 2013, Ishii founded Massive Goods with Graham Kolbeins, a line of Bara Japanese manga and paraphernalia tied to their graphic novel of the same name. She was a co-executive producer and writer on Kolbeins's 2019 documentary Queer Japan.

She is the translator of the English version of Tagame's manga My Brother's Husband.

== Published works ==
Ishii's translation credits include the Aranzi Machine Gun series, Aranzi Aronzo Fun Dolls (Let's Make Cute Stuff), The Cute Book, The Bad Book, Gunji, and Bat-Manga!: The Secret History of Batman in Japan.

Formerly with Vertical, she is the editor-in-chief of They're All So Beautiful and Paperhouses. As a writer, Ishii has been published by The Village Voice, Slate, Publishers Weekly, Guernica, Giant Robot, and Asian American Writers' Workshop.
