= Massive Goods =

American fashion brand and manga publisher

- Company type: Private
- Industry: Retail
- Founded: 2013
- Founders: Anne Ishii; Graham Kolbeins
- Fate: On hiatus (as of June 2019)
- Headquarters: New York, NY, United States
- Area served: North America
- Products: Gay manga, clothing
- Website: massive-goods.com

Massive Goods (or simply Massive) is a fashion brand and manga publisher. The company works with LGBTQ and feminist comic artists in Japan, particularly gay manga (bara) artists, to create products featuring their artwork, and English-language translations of their works.

== History ==
Massive was founded in 2013 by Anne Ishii and Graham Kolbeins concurrent with the release of The Passion of Gengoroh Tagame: Master of Gay Erotic Manga (Picturebox), the first English-language publication of works by Gengoroh Tagame, which Ishii and Kolbeins co-edited with Chip Kidd. Massive first released a line of t-shirts featuring artwork by Tagame and Jiraiya, which gained popularity in the LGBTQ hip-hop scene.

On June 7, 2019, Massive went on hiatus. While the company continues to fulfill online orders, it is not presently planning new product launches or events.

=== Fashion ===
In partnership with other brands, Massive has launched several fashion and accessory lines, primarily featuring Jiraiya's artwork. In June 2014, Massive, Jiraiya, and Opening Ceremony launched a product line to commemorate Pride Month which featured apparel, accessories, and a Tenga sex toy. That same year, Mission Chinese Food and Massive released a t-shirt collaboration, also featuring art by Jiraiya. A second collaboration with Opening Ceremony and Jiraiya, "Power-Up Massive", launched in 2015, along with a line of swim briefs with artwork by Jiraiya created by Pretty Snake, the fashion brand founded by Project Runway contestant Joe Segal.

=== Publishing ===
In December 2014, Fantagraphics published Massive: Gay Erotic Manga and the Men Who Make It, the first English-language anthology of gay manga. Co-edited by Ishii, Kolbeins, and Kidd, Massive was nominated for an Eisner Award for Best Anthology.

Massive has published several English-language translations of dōjinshi, including Cretian Cow by Gengoroh Tagame, and Caveman Guu and Two Hoses by Jiraiya.

In 2016, Massive co-produced with Koyama Press an English-language translation of What is Obscenity?: The Story of a Good For Nothing Artist and her Pussy, a graphic novel memoir by Rokudenashiko. The memoir was a finalist for the Los Angeles Times Book Prize. That same year, Massive began work with Pantheon Books on the English-language translation of My Brother's Husband, Gengoroh Tagame's first all-ages manga. The first volume in the series, translated by Ishii, won an Eisner Award for Best U.S. Edition of International Material—Asia.

Massive Gay Manga, a publishing imprint set to launch under Bruno Gmünder Verlag in 2017, was cancelled following the dissolution of the company.

== Artists represented ==
- Gengoroh Tagame
- Jiraiya
- Seizou Ebisubashi
- Inu Yoshi
- Rokudenashiko

== Publications ==
- The Passion of Gengoroh Tagame: Master of Gay Erotic Manga. PictureBox, 2013; Bruno Gmünder, 2016. Edited by Anne Ishii, Graham Kolbeins, and Chip Kidd; collecting works by Gengoroh Tagame
- Caveman Guu. 2013. Story and art by Jiraiya.
- Massive: Gay Erotic Manga and the Men Who Make It. Fantagraphics, 2014. Edited by Anne Ishii, Graham Kolbeins, and Chip Kidd; collecting works by Gengoroh Tagame, Inu Yoshi, Kumada Poohsuke, Takeshi Matsu, Jiraiya, Gai Mizuki, Fumi Miyabi, Seizoh Ebisubashi, and Kazuhide Ichikawa
- Cretian Cow. 2015. Story and art by Gengoroh Tagame
- What is Obscenity?: The Story of a Good For Nothing Artist and her Pussy. Co-production with Koyama, 2016. Story and art by Rokudenashiko.
- Two Hoses. 2017. Story and art by Jiraiya.
- My Brother's Husband. Volume 1. Pantheon, 2017. Story and art by Gengoroh Tagame.
- My Brother's Husband. Volume 2. Pantheon, 2018. Story and art by Gengoroh Tagame.
- Gengoroh Tagame: Sketchbook. 2018. Collecting works by Gengoroh Tagame.
