= Ben Kimura (artist) =

Gay Japanese artist

- 木村べん
- Born: 1947
- Died: February 18, 2003 (aged 56)
- Known for: Erotic illustration

Ben Kimura (Japanese: 木村べん, Hepburn: Kimura Ben; 1947 – February 18, 2003) was a Japanese gay erotic artist. Kimura, along with George Takeuchi and Sadao Hasegawa, is noted by artist and historian Gengoroh Tagame as a central figure in the second wave of contemporary gay artists that emerged in Japan in the 1970s.

== Biography ==
Kimura was born in 1947. He began his career in gay erotic art in 1978 as illustrator and cover artist for Barazoku, the first commercially published gay magazine in Japan; he would be a regular contributor before departing the magazine in 1989. He would contribute artwork to other gay magazines throughout his career, notably Sabu, G-men, and SM-Z. Kimura would also contribute artwork to the early yaoi magazines June and Allan, making him among the first gay artists to achieve crossover success with a female audience in yaoi publications. He was a co-founding member of Studio Kaiz, along with Naoki Tatsuya and his partner Kihira Kai.

Kimura's artwork was ubiquitous in gay publications in Japan in the 1970s and 1980s, with Gengoroh Tagame describing Kimura as the "face" of gay magazines in Japan. His works typically depict handsome, masculine men rendered in a homoerotic style that is frequently romantic and sensual, rather than explicitly pornographic. Artist Kazuhide Ichikawa has described Kimura's illustrations as "soft" and "nostalgic", while Tagame describes his art as featuring "sporty young men who look familiar, and not beautiful men who appear disconnected from reality."

On February 18, 2003, Kimura died at the age of 56 from a pulmonary embolism. A tribute edition of Tan Pan Body, a collection of his works self-published in 1997, was published shortly after his death. His collected works are held by Studio Kaiz.

== Collected works ==
- 1997 – Tan-Pan Body (画集), self-published
- 1998 – Go-One Boy (作品集), self-published
