= Ben Kimura =

Ben Kimura may refer to:

- Ben Kimura (artist) (木村 べん, 1947–2003), Japanese erotic artist
- Ben Kimura (politician) (木村 勉, born 1939), Japanese politician
