= Takeshi Matsu =

Japanese gay manga artist

- Born: March 10, 1973 (age 53)
- Known for: Gay manga artist

Takeshi Matsu (Japanese: 松武, Hepburn: Matsu Takeshi; born March 10, 1973) is a Japanese gay manga artist.

== Biography ==
Matsu grew up in "a village of around one thousand people in the middle of nowhere" in Japan. He first encountered gay erotic artwork while in high school, after discovering the works of artists Gengoroh Tagame and Jiraiya in the gay men's magazines G-men, Badi, and Barazoku. Matsu broke into the manga industry as an artist of mainstream shōnen manga, but quit over frustrations with the industry's editorial processes. At the age of 30, Matsu broke into gay manga as an artist for the magazine Kinnuku-Otoko (lit. Muscleman), a magazine aimed at a crossover audience of male gay manga fans and female yaoi fans.

Matsu has described his art as depicting "happy guys": his works are often contrasted to the darker material of his peers, which frequently depict acts of BDSM or non-consensual sex. Gay manga artist Gengoroh Tagame has described Matsu's art as depicting "the kind of men we know (or at least wish we did) having fun, playful sex. This lovemaking has emotional depth without baggage."

Matsu was among the artists whose works were included in Massive: Gay Erotic Manga and the Men Who Make It, the first English-language anthology of gay manga, published by Fantagraphics Books in 2014. Two English-language anthologies of works by Matsu, More and More of You and Other Stories and Dr. Makumakuran and Other Stories, were published by Bruno Gmünder Verlag in 2014 and 2015, respectively. The ongoing doujinshi series Between the Pine (松花堂), co-authored by Tsukasa Matsuzaki, is published annually by Matsu at Comiket.
