= Bara (genre) =

Gay manga

Bara (Japanese: 薔薇; lit. 'rose') is a colloquialism for a genre of Japanese art and media known within Japan as gay manga (ゲイ漫画) or gei komi (ゲイコミ; "gay comics"). The genre focuses on male same-sex love, as created primarily by gay men for a gay male audience. Bara can vary in visual style and plot but typically features masculine men with varying degrees of muscle, body fat, and body hair, akin to bear or bodybuilding culture. While bara is typically pornographic, the genre has also depicted romantic and autobiographical subject material, as it acknowledges the varied reactions to homosexuality in modern Japan.

The use of bara as an umbrella term to describe gay Japanese comic art is largely a non-Japanese phenomenon, and its use is not universally accepted by creators of gay manga. In non-Japanese contexts, bara is used to describe a wide breadth of Japanese, Japanese-inspired, or not-at-all influenced by Japanese culture -gay erotic media, including illustrations published in early Japanese gay men's magazines, western fan art, and gay pornography featuring human actors. Bara is distinct from yaoi, a genre of Japanese media focusing on homoerotic relationships between male characters that historically has been created by and for women.

== Etymology ==
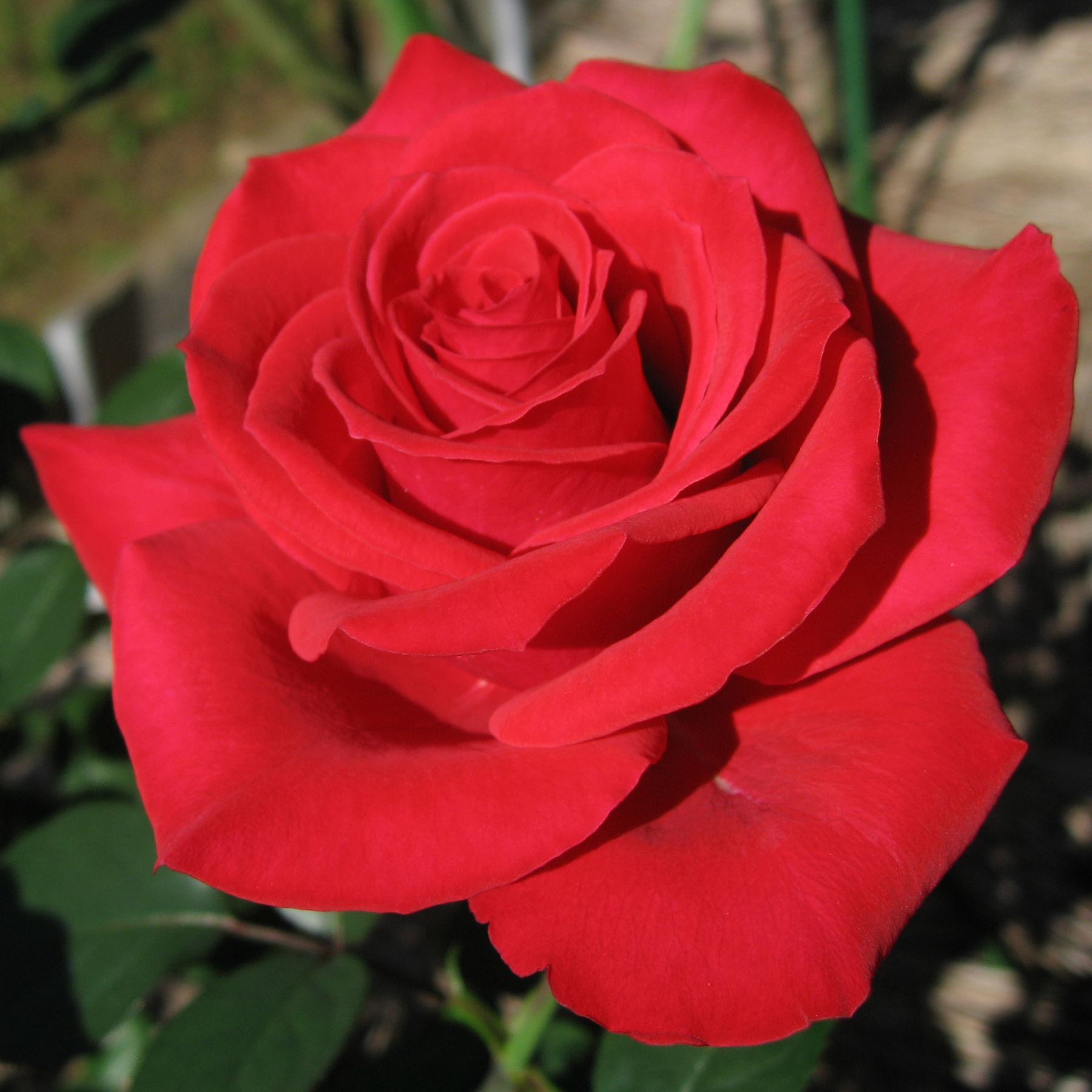
The term bara translates literally to "rose" in Japanese, and has historically been used as a pejorative for gay men roughly equivalent to the English language term "pansy".

The term bara (薔薇), which translates literally to "rose" in Japanese, has historically been used in Japan as a pejorative for gay men, roughly equivalent to the English language term "pansy". Beginning in the 1960s, the term was reappropriated by Japanese gay media, notably with the 1961 anthology Ba-ra-kei: Ordeal by Roses, a collection of semi-nude photographs of gay writer Yukio Mishima by photographer Eikoh Hosoe, and later with Barazoku (薔薇族; lit. "rose tribe") in 1971, the first commercially produced gay magazine in Asia. Bara-eiga ("rose film") was additionally used in the 1980s to describe gay cinema.

By the late 1980s, as LGBT political movements in Japan began to form, the term fell out of use, with gei (ゲイ) becoming the preferred nomenclature for people who experience same-sex attraction. The term was revived as a pejorative in the late 1990s concurrent with the rise of internet message boards and chat rooms, where heterosexual administrators designated the gay sections of their websites as "bara boards" or "bara chat". The term was subsequently adopted by non-Japanese users of these websites, who believed that bara was the proper designation for the images and artwork being posted on these forums. Since the 2000s, bara has been used by this non-Japanese audience as an umbrella term to describe a wide variety of Japanese and non-Japanese gay media featuring masculine men, including western fan art, gay pornography, furry artwork, and numerous other categories.

This misappropriation of bara by a non-Japanese audience has been controversial among creators of gay manga, many of whom have expressed discomfort or confusion over the term being used to describe their work. Artist and historian Gengoroh Tagame has described bara as "a very negative word that comes with bad connotations", though he later clarified that the term is "convenient for talking about art that is linked by characters that are muscle-y, huge, and hairy", and that his objection was the term's use to describe gay manga creators. Artist Kumada Poohsuke has stated that while he does not find the term offensive, he does not describe his work as bara because he associates the term with Barazoku, which featured bishōnen-style artwork rather than artwork of masculine men.

== History ==
=== Context: Homosexuality in Japanese visual art ===
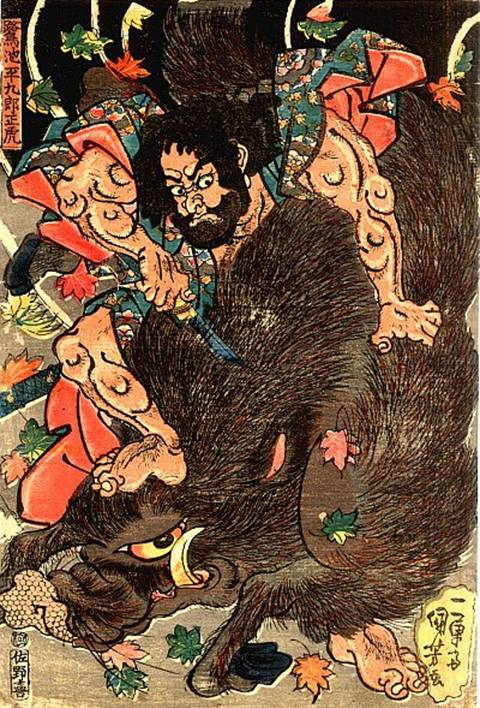
A musha-e print by Utagawa Kuniyoshi (c. 1834)

Representations of homosexuality in Japanese visual art have a history and context dating to the Muromachi period, as seen in Chigo no sōshi (稚児之草子, a collection of illustrations and stories on relationships between Buddhist monks and their adolescent male acolytes) and shunga (erotic woodblock prints originating in the Edo period). While these works ostensibly depict male-male sexual relations, artist and historian Gengoroh Tagame questions whether the historic practices of sodomy and pederasty represented in these works can be considered analogous to modern conceptions of gay identity, and thus part of the artistic tradition to which contemporary gay erotic Japanese art belongs. Tagame instead considers musha-e (warrior's pictures) to be a more direct forerunner to art styles common in gay manga: in contrast to pederastic shunga, both gay manga and musha-e portray masculine men with developed muscles and thick body hair, often in cruel or violent scenarios.

=== 1960s: Early erotic magazines ===
While erotic artwork was a major component of the earliest gay Japanese periodicals, notably the 1952 private circulation magazine Adonis, contemporary gay erotic art as a medium in Japan traces its origins to the fetish magazine Fuzokukitan. Published from 1960 to 1974, Fuzokukitan included gay content alongside straight and lesbian content, as well as articles on homosexuality. Early gay erotic artists Tatsuji Okawa, Sanshi Funayama, Go Mishima and Go Hirano made their debuts in the magazine, alongside unauthorized reproductions of illustrations by gay Western artists such as George Quaintance and Tom of Finland. Bara, the first Japanese magazine aimed specifically at a gay male audience, was published in 1964 as a members only, small circulation magazine.

Gay erotic art of this period typically depicts what Tagame describes as "darkly spiritual male beauty", emphasizing a sense of sorrow and sentimentalism. Men from "the traditional homosocial world of Japan", such as samurai and yakuza, appear frequently as subjects. The homoerotic photography of Tamotsu Yatō and Kuro Haga served as a significant influence on the initial wave of gay artists that emerged in the 1960s, with very little Western influence seen in these early works.

=== 1970s and 1980s: Genre commercialization ===
Erotic magazines aimed specifically at a gay male audience proliferated in the 1970s – first Barazoku in 1971, followed by Adon and Sabu in 1974 – leading to the decline of general fetish magazines like Fuzokukitan. These new magazines featured gay manga as part of their editorial material; notable early serializations include Gokigenyō (ごきげん曜, "How Are You") by Yamaguchi Masaji (山口正児) in Barazoku, and Tough Guy (タフガイ) and Make Up (メイクアップ) by Kaidō Jin (海藤仁) in Adon. The commercial success of these magazines resulted in the creation of spin off publications that focused on photography and illustrations: Barazoku launched Seinen-gahō (青年画報, "Young Men's Illustrated News"), while Sabu launched Aitsu (あいつ, "That Guy") and Sabu Special. Most notable among these spin-offs was Barakomi (バラコミ), a 1986 supplemental issue of Barazoku that was the first magazine to publish gay manga exclusively.

By the 1980s, gay lifestyle magazines that published articles on gay culture alongside erotic material had grown in popularity: The Gay was launched by photographer Ken Tōgō, MLMW launched as a lifestyle spinoff of Adon, and Samson launched as a lifestyle magazine in 1982 before later shifting to content focused on fat fetishism. Most publishers folded their spin-off and supplemental publications by the end of the decade, though gay magazines continued to publish gay artwork and manga.

The artists that emerged during this period, notably Sadao Hasegawa, Ben Kimura, Rune Naito, and George Takeuchi, varied widely in style and subject material. Nonetheless, their artwork was united by a tone that was generally less sorrowful than that of the artists that emerged in the 1960s, a trend Tagame attributes to the gradual decline in the belief that homosexuality was shameful or abnormal. Their work was also more overtly influenced by American and European gay culture in its subject material, with sportsmen, jock straps, and leather garments appearing more frequently than yakuza and samurai. Tagame attributes this shift to the increased access to American gay pornography for use as reference material and inspiration, and the growth in popularity of sports manga, which emphasized themes of athleticism and manliness.

=== 1990s: G-men and aesthetic changes ===
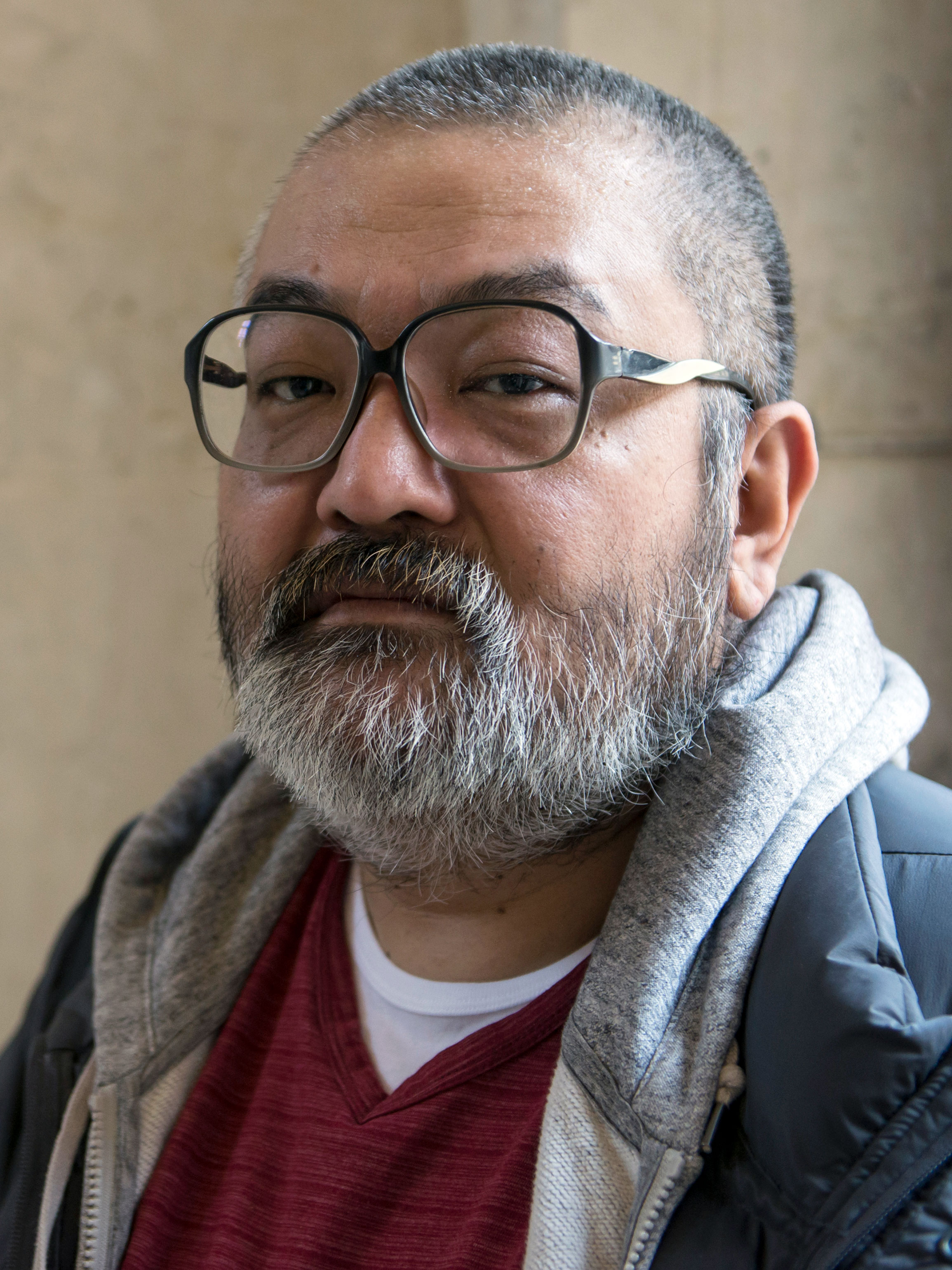
Gengoroh Tagame, whose manga in G-men is credited with shifting the aesthetics of gay manga towards masculine men

The trend towards lifestyle-focused publishing continued into the 1990s, with the founding of the magazines Badi ("Buddy") in 1994 and G-men in 1995. Both of these magazines included editorial coverage of gay pride, club culture, and HIV/AIDS-related topics alongside gay manga and other erotic content. G-men was co-founded by Gengoroh Tagame, who made his debut as a gay manga artist in 1987 writing manga for Sabu, and who would emerge as the most influential creator in the medium.

G-men was part of a concerted effort by Tagame to "change the status quo of gay magazines" away from the aesthetic of bishōnen – delicate and androgynous boys and young men that were popular in gay media at the time – and towards the depictions of masculine men that gay manga is now associated with. The "bear-type" aesthetic pioneered by Tagame's manga in G-men is credited with provoking a major stylistic shift in Shinjuku Ni-chōme, the gay neighborhood of Tokyo. Following the publication of G-men, the "slender and slick" clean-shaven style popular among gay men was replaced with "stubble, beards and moustaches [...] extremely short became the most common hairstyle, and the broad muscular body, soon to evolve to chubby and outright fat, became highly fashionable."

Manga culture significantly influenced gay erotic artwork during this period, and gay manga occupied a central place in the editorial material of both Badi and G-men. G-men in particular served as an incubator for up-and-coming gay manga talent, launching the careers of artists such as Jiraiya. The magazine also encouraged steady readership by publishing serialized stories, which encouraged purchase of every issue. Conversely, Adon removed pornographic material from the magazine entirely; the move was unsuccessful, and the magazine folded in 1996.

=== 2000s–present: The decline of magazines and the rise of "bara" ===
Gay magazines declined significantly in popularity by the early 2000s, as the personal advertisement sections that drove sales for many of these magazines were supplanted by telephone personals and later online dating. Nearly all of the major gay magazines folded in the subsequent two decades: Sabu in 2001, Barazoku in 2004, G-men in 2016, and Badi in 2019. As of 2022, only Samson remains active. As magazines declined, new types of gay art emerged from contexts entirely separate from gay magazines. Pamphlets and flyers for gay events and education campaigns in Japan began to feature vector artwork that, while not overtly pornographic, drew on gay manga in style and form. Art exhibitions also became an area of expression, as new venues and spaces emerged that welcomed the display of gay erotic artwork. With a lack of viable major print alternatives, many gay manga artists began to self-publish their works as dōjinshi (self-published comics). Gay manga artists like Gai Mizuki emerged as prolific creators of dōjinshi, creating slash-inspired derivative works based on media properties such as Attack on Titan and Fate/Zero.

Beginning in the 2000s, gay manga began to attract an international audience through the circulation of pirated and scanlated artwork on the internet. A scanlation of Kuso Miso Technique, a 1987 one-shot by Junichi Yamakawa originally published in Bara-Komi, became infamous during this period as an internet meme. Bara emerged among this international audience as a term to distinguish gay erotic art created by gay men for a gay male audience from yaoi, or gay erotic art created by and for women (see Comparison to yaoi below). The circulation of these works online led to the formation of an international bara fandom, and the emergence of non-Japanese gay erotic artists who began to draw in a "bara style" that was influenced by Japanese erotic art. This period also saw the rise in popularity of kemono (ケモノ, "beastmen", or anthropomorphic characters analogous to the Western furry subculture) as subjects in gay manga, a trend Tagame attributes to appearances by this type of character in video games and anime.

== Concepts and themes ==
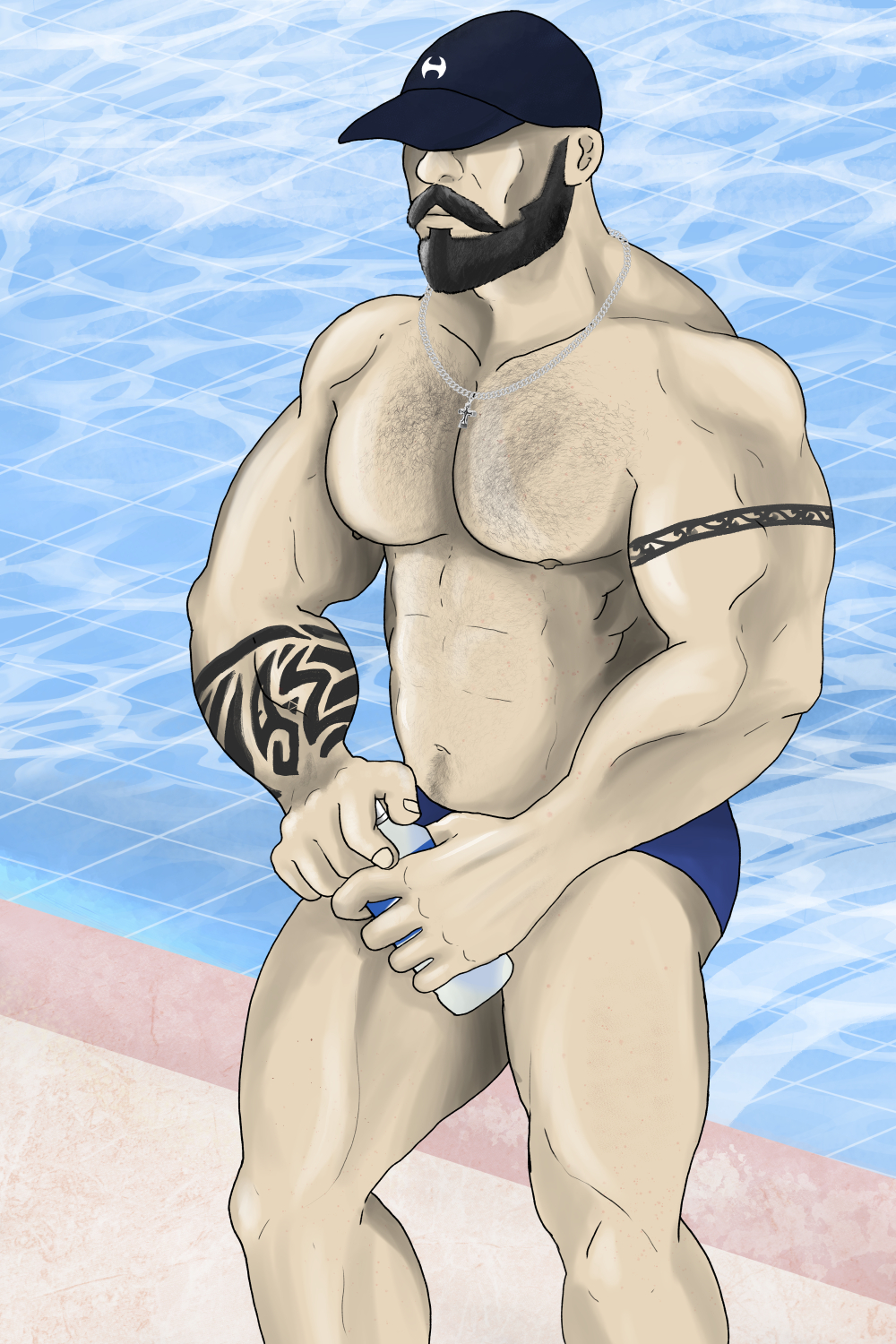
Gay manga often features masculine men with varying degrees of muscle, body fat, and body hair. This is a drawing of a muscular man without defined abdominal muscles, which provides a typical example of a gachimuchi body type.

Gay manga is typically categorized based on the body shape of the characters depicted; common designations include gatchiri (ガッチリ; "muscular"), gachimuchi (ガチムチ; "muscle-curvy" or "muscle-chubby"), gachidebu (ガチデブ; "muscle-fat"), and debu (デブ; "fat"). While the rise of comic anthologies has promoted longer, serialized stories, most gay manga stories are one-shots. BDSM and non-consensual sex are common themes in gay manga, as well as stories based on relationships structured around age, status, or power dynamics. Often, the older or more senior character uses the younger or subordinate character for sexual purposes, though some gay manga stories subvert this dynamic and show a younger, physically smaller, often white-collar man as the dominant sexual partner to an older, larger, often blue-collar man. As with yaoi, the bottom in gay manga is often depicted as shy, reluctant, or unsure of his sexuality. Consequently, much of the criticism of yaoi – misogyny, a focus on rape, the absence of a Western-style gay identity—is similarly leveled against gay manga.

The majority of gay manga stories are pornographic, often focusing on sex to the exclusion of plot and character development. Though some gay manga stories include realistic depictions of gay male lives—addressing subject material such as coming out, gay pride, and same-sex marriage – sex and sexuality is frequently the primary focus. Nonetheless, some gay manga stories explore romantic, autobiographical, and dramatic subject material, and eschew depictions of sex entirely. A notable example of non-erotic gay manga is My Brother's Husband, the first all-ages manga by Gengoroh Tagame, which focuses on themes of homophobia, cultural difference, and family.

== Media ==
=== Japanese publishing ===
Until the early 2000s, gay manga was published exclusively in gay general interest magazines. These magazines typically published 8 to 24 page one-shots (standalone single chapter stories), although some magazines, notably G-men, published serialized stories. Several attempts were made at creating publications dedicated exclusively to gay manga prior to the 2000s, notably Bara-Komi in 1986 and P-Nuts in 1996, though none were commercially successful.

In 2002, boys' love (BL) publisher Kosai Comics (光彩コミックス) released the manga anthology Kinniku-Otoko (筋肉男, "Muscleman"), a quarterly anthology featuring what the publisher termed "muscle BL" aimed at a crossover audience of yaoi and gay manga readers (see Crossover with yaoi below). Many of the contributors to Kinniku-Otoko began their manga careers as dōjinshi creators, and most were women; over time Kinniku-Otoko came to include gay male artists, notably gay manga artist Takeshi Matsu, who made his debut as an erotic artist in the anthology.

In 2004, G-men parent company Furukawa Shobu published a pair of manga anthologies aimed at gay men, Bakudan (published quarterly) and Gekidan (published bimonthly). Individual titles from these anthologies were collected into tankōbon under the Bakudan Comics imprint. In 2006, boys' love publisher Aqua Comics (an imprint of Oakla Publishing) began publishing the "men's love" (ML メンズラブ, menzu rabu) manga anthologies Nikutai Ha (Muscle Aqua), Oaks, and G's Comics. When collected into tankōbon, these manga are issued under the same imprint as Aqua's mainstream yaoi books, and bear the same trade dress. Since the release of The Dangerous Games of Dr. Makumakuran by Takeshi Matsu in 2015, no additional gay manga titles have been published by Aqua.

=== Foreign publishing ===
Many Japanese publishers and creators of gay manga actively seek foreign readers, though in lieu of official licensed translations, gay manga is often pirated and scanlated into English. In 2008, Spanish publisher La Cúpula published an anthology of works by Jiraiya, and manga by Gengoroh Tagame in 2010. In 2011, the Mexican gay magazine Anal Magazine published drawings by Gengoroh Tagame in its second issue. Works by Gengoroh Tagame have additionally been translated into French by H&O éditions. The first gay manga to receive an officially licensed English-language translation was Standing Ovations, a one-shot by Gengoroh Tagame published in the American erotic comics anthology Thickness (2011–2012). In 2012, Digital Manga published an English-language translation of Reibun Ike's Hide and Seek, a men's love series originally published by Aqua Comics.

In 2013, PictureBox published The Passion of Gengoroh Tagame: Master of Gay Erotic Manga, the first book-length work of gay manga to be published in English. That same year, Massive Goods was founded by Anne Ishii and Graham Kolbeins, two of the editors of The Passion of Gengoroh Tagame, which creates English-language translations of gay manga and products featuring the works of gay manga artists. In December 2014, Fantagraphics and Massive published Massive: Gay Erotic Manga and the Men Who Make It, the first English-language anthology of gay manga. Co-edited by Ishii, Kolbeins, and Chip Kidd, Massive was nominated for an Eisner Award for Best Anthology. From 2014 to 2016, German book publishing house Bruno Gmünder Verlag published works by Tagame, Takeshi Matsu, and Mentaiko Itto in English under their "Bruno Gmünder Gay Manga" imprint.

=== Other media ===
In contrast to hentai and yaoi, which are regularly adapted from manga to original video animations (OVAs) and ongoing animated series, there have been no anime adaptations of gay manga. This can be owed to the significant financial costs associated with producing animation relative to the niche audience of gay manga, as well as the absence of gay manga magazines producing serialized content that would lend itself to episodic adaptation. Despite this, the increased presence of objectified masculine bodies as fan service in anime beginning in the 2010s has been cited as an example of gay manga's influence on mainstream anime, as in series such as All Out!!, Free!, and Golden Kamuy.

== Comparison to yaoi ==
=== Distinction from yaoi ===
Yaoi (やおい; also known as boys' love or BL) is an additional manga genre that focuses on gay male romance and sex. The genre is a distinct category from gay manga, having originated in the 1970s as an offshoot of shōjo manga that was inspired by Barazoku and European cinema. Yaoi has historically been created primarily by women for a primarily female audience, and typically features bishōnen who often do not self-identify as gay or bisexual. The genre is often framed as a form of escapist fiction, depicting sex that is free of the patriarchal trappings of heterosexual pornography; yaoi can therefore be understood as a primarily feminist phenomenon, whereas gay manga is an expression of gay male identity. Gay manga does not aim to recreate heteronormative gender roles, as yaoi does with seme and uke dynamics.

=== Crossover with yaoi ===
The early 2000s saw a degree of overlap between yaoi and gay manga in BDSM-themed publications. The yaoi BDSM anthology magazine Zettai Reido (絶対零度) had several male contributors, while several female yaoi authors have contributed stories to BDSM-themed gay manga anthologies or special issues, occasionally under male pen names. Concurrently, several yaoi publishers commissioned works featuring masculine men, aimed at appealing to an audience of both gay manga and yaoi readers (see Japanese publishing above). Gengoroh Tagame argues that these crossover publications represent the movement of yaoi away from aestheticism and towards the commercialization of male-male sexuality for a female market.

The late 2010s and onwards have seen the increasing popularity of masculine men in yaoi, with growing emphasis on stories featuring larger and more muscular bodies, older characters, and seme and uke characters of physically comparable sizes. A 2017 survey by yaoi publisher Juné Manga found that while over 80% of their readership previously preferred bishōnen body types exclusively, 65% now enjoy both bishōnen and muscular body types. Critics and commentators have noted that this shift in preferences among yaoi readers, and subsequent creation of works that feature characteristics of both yaoi and gay manga represent a blurring of the distinctions between the genres; anthropologist Thomas Baudinette notes in his fieldwork that gay men in Japan "saw no need to sharply disassociate BL from gei komi when discussing their consumption of 'gay media'."

== See also ==
- Gay magazines in Japan (in Japanese)
- Gay pornography in Japan (in Japanese)
- Gay video in Japan (in Japanese)
- Billy Herrington, American pornographic film actor and subject of the "Gachimuchi Pants Wrestling" internet meme
- LGBT themes in comics
- Pornography in Japan
