= Gai Mizuki =

Japanese manga artist

- Born: June 11
- Known for: Gay manga artist

Gai Mizuki (Japanese: 水樹凱, Hepburn: Mizuki Gai), also known as Rycanthropy, is a Japanese gay manga artist and dōjin soft producer.

== Biography ==
Mizuki was born in the Kansai region of Japan. He studied music and competed in hurdling while in school, giving up the latter after suffering an injury, and later worked as a web developer. Mizuki pursued illustration as a hobby since his early childhood, creating his first comic in the sixth grade.

After discovering the works of artist Gengoroh Tagame at the age of twenty-three, Mizuki began drawing gay manga. His works have appeared in the gay men's magazines G-men, Badi, and Barazoku, as well as the yaoi manga anthology Nikutaiha, which attracted a crossover audience of both gay male and heterosexual female readers.

Mizuki is noted as a prolific creator of slash dōjinshi based on existing media properties, and has produced works based on Kill la Kill, Tiger and Bunny, Fate/Grand Order, Final Fantasy XV, Voltron: Legendary Defender, and numerous others. In addition to these derivative works, Mizuki has produced a range of original titles, including four dōjin soft (self-made video games): G-Case, Jalpon, ハニかむBINGO, and Howling Wolf.

Mizuki's works are noted for their "BL-style" storytelling, with a focus on dialogue and character development over straight erotica, with yakuza featured as a common recurring element. Among his influences, Mizuki cites music as having a significant impact on his work, specifically citing the composers Yoko Kanno and Yasutaka Nakata.

Works by Mizuki were included in the 2014 manga anthology Massive: Gay Erotic Manga and the Men Who Make It, the first English-language anthology of gay manga, published by Fantagraphics Books.
