= Massive: Gay Erotic Manga and the Men Who Make It =

2014 manga anthology

- First edition cover
- Editors: Anne Ishii; Chip Kidd; Graham Kolbeins
- Authors: Gengoroh Tagame; Inu Yoshi; Kumada Poohsuke; Takeshi Matsu; Jiraiya; Gai Mizuki; Fumi Miyabi; Seizoh Ebisubashi; Kazuhide Ichikawa
- Working title: The Bara Book
- Language: English
- Genre: Gay manga
- Publisher: Fantagraphics Books
- Publication date: December 18, 2014
- Publication place: United States
- ISBN: 978-1606997857

Massive: Gay Erotic Manga and the Men Who Make It is a 2014 manga anthology edited by Anne Ishii, Chip Kidd, and Graham Kolbeins, and published by Fantagraphics Books. Collecting works from Gengoroh Tagame, Jiraiya, and numerous other artists, it is the first English-language anthology of gay manga.

== Contents ==
Massive is composed of nine comics by prominent gay manga artists, each of which is accompanied by an interview with the artist. The works included are:

Do You Remember South Island P.O.W. Camp? by Gengoroh Tagame
An excerpt from Tagame's six-hundred-page manga series about a sadomasochistic relationship between a Japanese prisoner of war and an American general set during the occupation of Japan.

Kandagawa-kun by Inu Yoshi
A man acquires a "mildly erotic" domestic robot.

Dreams of the New Century Theatre Issue #1 and With All Your Might by Kumada Poohsuke
A series of four-panel comics about an office worker with a foot fetish.

Kannai's Dilemma by Takeshi Matsu
An art student's nude illustrations are discovered by a jock transfer student.

Caveman Guu by Jiraiya
A caveman learns about human reproduction.

Fantasy and Jump Rope by Gai Mizuki
A physical education teacher is taught how to jump rope by a fellow instructor.

Tengudake by Fumi Miyabi
A group of men use magic mushrooms to exile a tengu from their village.

Mr. Tokugawa Grade 5 Room 4 Homeroom Teacher by Seizoh Ebisubashi
A teacher with a high sex drive is caught masturbating by a student's father and the school's janitor.

Yakuza Godfathers by Kazuhide Ichikawa
Two rival yakuza bosses are drugged with a powerful aphrodisiac by their gang members so they can reconcile their differences.

Manga artist Go Fujimoto was referenced in the tentative list of authors in early press materials for Massive, but does not appear in the anthology.

== Development and publication ==
Massive was conceived in 2012 when Graham Kolbeins sought to interview gay manga creators for his personal blog, seeking assistance from Anne Ishii for Japanese translation; Ishii had previously worked as a private translator for the gay manga collection of graphic designer Chip Kidd. Kolbeins, Ishii, and Kidd jointly pitched publisher PictureBox for what would become two books: The Passion of Gengoroh Tagame: Master of Gay Erotic Manga, the first English-language book of works by Gengoroh Tagame, and Massive. Ishii and Kolbeins traveled to Japan to conduct interviews for the books, and concurrently launched Massive Goods, a fashion brand and gay manga publisher.

At the Toronto Comic Arts Festival in May 2013, PictureBox formally announced that it would publish Massive for release in spring 2014. Following the dissolution of PictureBox in December 2013, Fantagraphics announced that it had acquired the license to the title, which it published on December 18, 2014. To promote the release of the book, Jiraiya made his first-ever public appearance as an artist, attending signings and speaking events in Los Angeles, San Francisco, and New York.

== Reception ==
Massive was positively received by critics, and was nominated for Best Anthology at the Eisner Awards in 2015. Writer and editor Shaenon K. Garrity called Massive "one of the best, not to mention one of the smuttiest, collections of manga ever published in the U.S." in her review of the anthology for Anime News Network. Publishers Weekly called the anthology a "fascinating overview of contemporary gay manga and its creators", while IndieWire praised Massive as an "intriguing insight into a segment of Japanese pop culture that’s virtually unknown in the West." The A.V. Club characterized Massive as "more than just a collection of pornographic stories," noting that "just like any other great pieces of art, these stories are outlets for unbridled creative expression."
