= Aranzi Aronzo =

Japanese company

Aranzi Machine Gun vol. 1

Aranzi Aronzo is a publisher of Japanese-styled crafts books. The company is run by Mrs. Saito and Ms. Yomura, and they say that their catch phrase is "cute, strange, cool, silly, a little bit horrible, stupid and comfortable ARANZI ARONZO". The company has created several stores, books, exhibitions, and advertisements and in 2007, some of the books were published in North America by Vertical Inc.

The style of Aranzi Aronzo has been described as kawaii, meaning cute in Japanese; using expressive mascots, Aranzi Aronzo has effectively created a colorful cast of characters featured in the books. The Aranzi Aronzo characters have also been put on t-shirts, notebooks, and postcards, to name a few things.

== Books ==
Aranzi Aronzo has produced several books containing images of their projects in often humorous situations, some of which have been released in North America.

=== The Cute Book ===
One of the first books to be released in English, The Cute Book was released in hardcover in February 2007. It features dozens of patterns and instructions for making Aranzi Aronzo style crafts. Several characters like Bad Guy, Pinkie, Spritekin, Sprite, Lizard, Monkey, White Rabbit and Brown Bunny, and White, Striped and Black Cat appear in the book and can be made from patterns with felt.

=== The Bad Book ===
Also released in February 2007 in English, The Bad Book is similar to the first book, but focuses on the darker Aranzi Aronzo characters. These include Bad Guy, Liar, Thief, alongside the rest of the Bad Guys. Small comics with the characters are featured throughout the book.

=== Cute Dolls and Fun Dolls ===
These books, released in October 2007 in North America, explain how to make stuffed animal versions of the Aranzi Aronzo characters. These books use characters like White Rabbit, Brown Bunny, The Bad Guy, and Liar and feature new ones like Silky, the Panda-Bug, and Eyelash Bunny.

=== Machine Gun ===
Aranzi Machine Gun was released throughout the summer of 2007 in English in three volumes. These books show off the lives of the Aranzi Aronzo characters and have small crafts at the end of each issue.

=== Aranzi Cute Stuff ===
This book included projects such as hairbands, book covers, and bags. It was released March 11, 2008.

== See also ==
- "allons-y Alonso!" ("let's go, Alonso!")
