= Musha-e =

Japanese art form

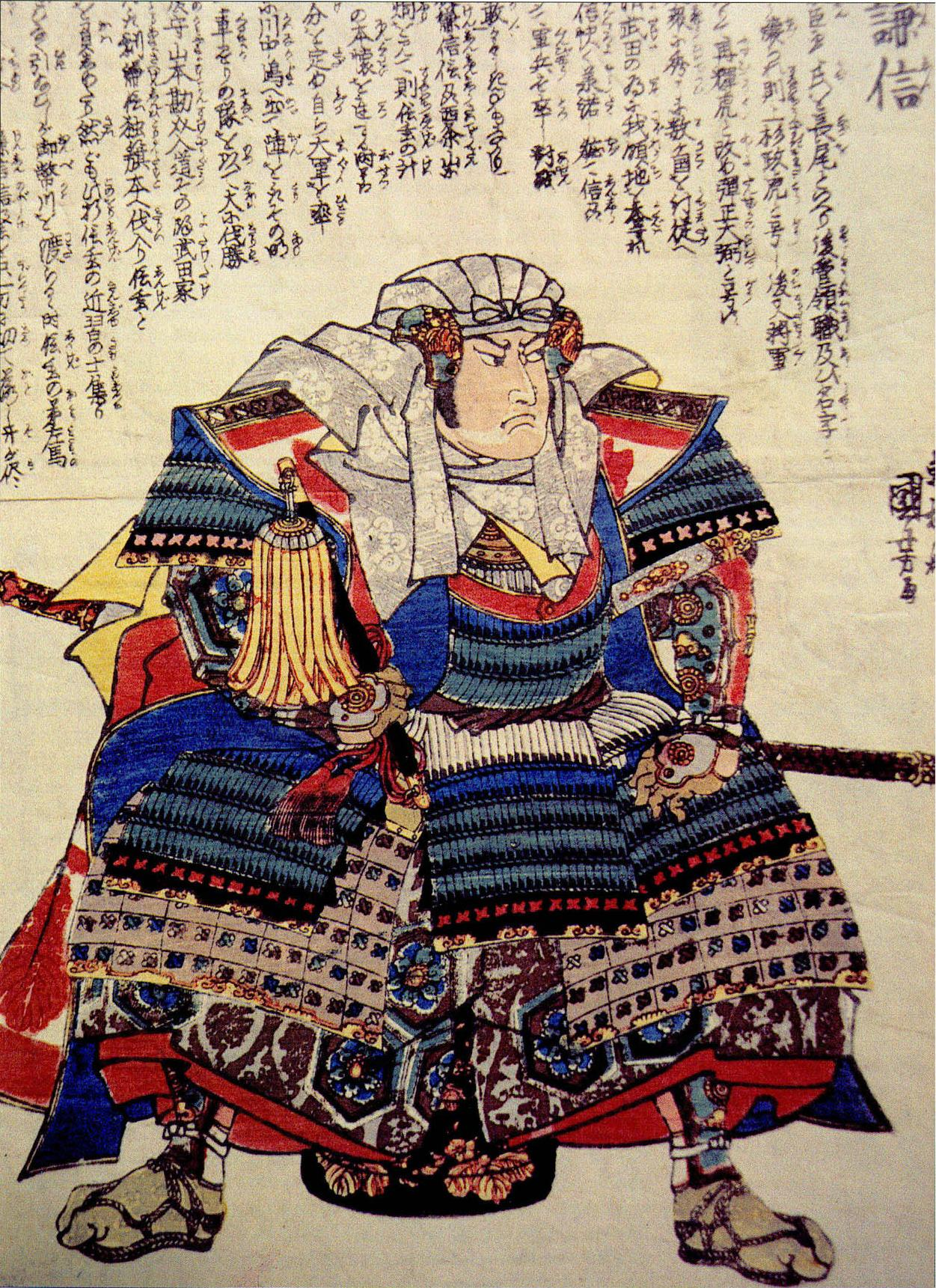
Utagawa Kuniyoshi's fierce depiction of Uesugi Kenshin, originally printed in the book Stories of 100 Heroes of High Renown between 1843 and 1844

Musha-e (武者絵), a type of Japanese art developed in the late 18th century, is a genre of the ukiyo-e woodblock printing technique. It represents images of warriors and samurai from Japanese history and mythology.

== History ==
=== Edo Period ===
The earliest examples of musha-e were created in the late 18th century as illustrations for classical stories of Japanese literature. During that period, artists like Masanobu Okumura were prominent. The demand for images and stories of past heroes and legendary events of samurai courage came largely from the same public that appreciated the broader themes of the "floating world"; stories of warriors also appealed to enduring values of masculine virtue. In 1835, the publisher Sūzanbō commissioned Hokusai to produce three volumes of warrior images devoted respectively to wisdom, humanity, and bravery. The first, Wakan Ehon Sakigake, and the second, Ehon Musashi Abumi (1836), were published, but the third, advertised as Ehon Katsushika-buri, seems never to have gone to prints, although its block ready drawings survive. As the ukiyo-e technique thrived during the 19th century, musha-e became more popular. Kuniyoshi, a famous printmaker, specialized in warrior images and produced a series of prints known as the 108 Heroes of the Suikoden. During the late Edo period, censorship laws passed by the Tokugawa Shogunate made the creation of musha-e more difficult. Artists and publishers therefore often changed the names of characters or events depicted. Artists from the Utagawa School such as Kunisada or Hiroshige produced many musha-e prints.

=== Meiji Period and after ===
As the Tokugawa Shogun was overruled by the Meiji Emperor, the rapid Westernisation of Japan brought many changes in society. Nationalism grew considerably, and the epic history of Japanese warfare was brought to a new light. Artist Yoshitoshi Tsukioka produced several musha-e depicting generals and heroes of Japan.

As the country grew militarized, musha-e shifted from depictions of legendary warriors to actual soldiers and generals. By the beginning of the 20th century, this shift led the creation of a new style, senso-e, meaning "images of war".

== Gallery ==
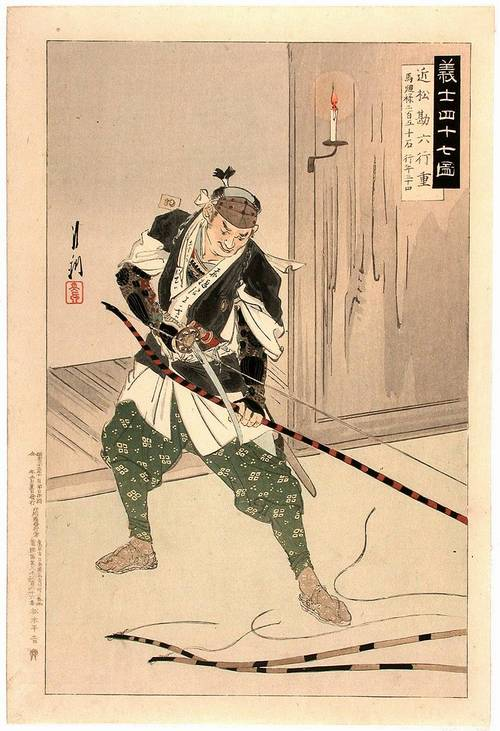
By Ogata Gekko from his 47 Ronin, between 1895 and 1903

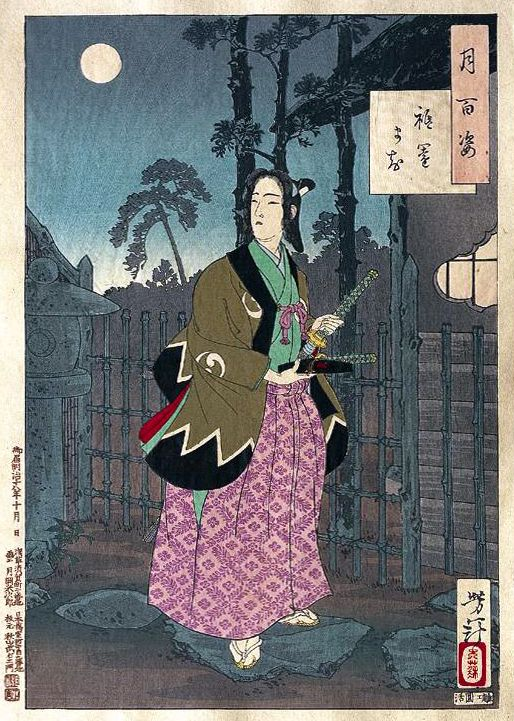
By Yoshitoshi from his 100 Aspects of the Moon, c. 1890

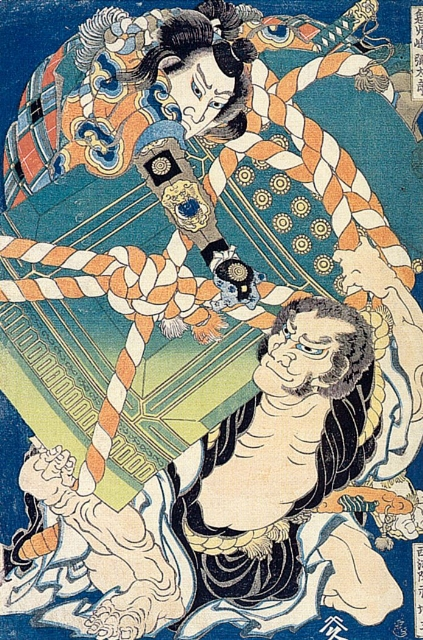
By Hokusai featuring Kojima Yatarō and Saihoin Akabozu, c. 1830
