= Graham Kolbeins =

Canadian filmmaker, writer, and fashion designer

- Born: October 23, 1987 (age 38); Vancouver, British Columbia
- Occupations: Filmmaker, writer
- Known for: Rad Queers, The House of Gay Art

Graham Kolbeins is a Canadian filmmaker, writer, and fashion designer.

== Background ==
Kolbeins' documentary films have focused on themes of LGBTQ art and activism, including the web series Rad Queers and the documentary short film The House of Gay Art. As co-founder and creative director of the brand Massive Goods Kolbeins and collaborator Anne Ishii worked with Japanese artists including gay manga artist Gengoroh Tagame and feminist artist Rokudenashiko to produce English translations of their work as well as fashion collections for brands including Opening Ceremony and Mishka.

== Works ==
=== Films ===
The Japan-U.S. Friendship Commission named Kolbeins a recipient of their Creative Artists Exchange Fellowship in 2016, and he subsequently spent five months filming a feature documentary about sexuality and gender identity in Japan titled Queer Japan. Currently in post-production, the film features a variety of artists, activists, dancers, drag queens, and everyday persons. The cast includes Gengoroh Tagame, drag queen and artist Vivienne Sato, transgender politician Aya Kamikawa, and photographer Leslie Kee. Kolbeins' short-form work includes Rad Queers, a series of documentary profiles on artists and activists; as well as collaborations with artist Rafa Esparza, musician Dorian Wood, writer Beau Rice, and the magazine New American Paintings. He also created a found footage experimental short Food Horror which explored stigma towards eating embedded with the teen television drama Pretty Little Liars.

=== Books ===
Along with Chip Kidd and Anne Ishii, Kolbeins is the co-editor of two books on Japanese gay art: The Passion of Gengoroh Tagame and Fantagraphics' anthology, Massive: Gay Erotic Manga and the Men Who Make It, which was nominated for an Eisner award in 2015. The team also collaborated on Koyama Press' English-language edition of What Is Obscenity?, a graphic memoir by the artist Rokudenashiko chronicling her arrest on obscenity charges for making 3D printed vagina art, which was nominated for a Los Angeles Times Book Award.
