= Jiraiya (artist) =

Japanese pseudonymous manga artist

Jiraiya 児雷也
- Born: April 28, 1967 (age 59) Sapporo, Hokkaido, Japan
- Areas: Manga artist, illustrator, graphic designer
- Notable works: Room for Five Guys (五人部屋, Gonin Beya); Song of Gratitude (仰ゲバ尊シ, Aogeba Toutoshi); Three Crows (田亀 源五郎, Sanba no Karasu)

Jiraiya (児雷也, born April 28, 1967) is a pseudonymous Japanese gay manga artist and illustrator. He is noted for his homoerotic, hyperreal drawings of gachimuchi (ガチムチ; "muscle-curvy" or "muscle-chubby") men, and for his use of digital illustration in his artwork.

== Biography ==
Jiraiya was born in 1967 to a working-class family in Sapporo, Japan. In the late 1980s, he discovered the gay magazine Sabu, and was influenced by the artwork by Gengoroh Tagame published in the magazine. In his twenties, Jiraiya worked as a mangaka for Shogakukan, and later as a graphic designer.

His career as a gay manga artist began in 1998 when, at the age of 31, he submitted to and was published in the magazine G-men. He became the exclusive cover artist for G-men in 2001, replacing Gengoroh Tagame following his departure from the magazine, and illustrated the covers for issues 63 to 124 (2001 to 2006). In addition to cover illustrations, Jiraiya contributed manga to G-men.

In his private life, Jiraiya works as a commercial advertising designer and is closeted. Consequently, he is notoriously reclusive, rarely makes public appearances, and does not publish photographs of his face.

== Style ==
Jiraiya specializes in pin-up art of hypermasculine men with large, muscular builds, and was one of the first gay manga artists to use digital illustration extensively in his work. He is noted for his hyperreal drawing style, the result of a process in which he creates a freehand sketch from a photographic reference of body parts from different men collaged into a single figure, which he then augments with Photoshop, Illustrator, and QuarkXPress.

Japanese iconography figures heavily into Jiraiya's artwork, including kendo and judo uniforms, Buddhist monks, festival costumes, and fundoshi. His narrative works are typically comic and light-hearted in tone, contrasting the sadomasochistic material of his peers, and deal with themes of group sex, romance, and athletic competition.

== Works ==
=== Publishing ===
Jiraiya has published three major collections of manga: Room for Five Guys (五人部屋, Gonin Beya), Song of Gratitude (仰ゲバ尊シ, Aogeba Toutoshi), and Three Crows (田亀 源五郎, Sanba no Karasu). Two anthologies his art have been published: The Art of Jiraiya by French publisher H&O in 2007, and Art Works of Jiraiya: 1998–2012 by Japanese publisher Furukawa Shobou in 2012. In 2014, works by Jiraiya were included in Massive: Gay Erotic Manga and the Men Who Make It, the first English-language anthology of gay manga. Two dōjinshi by Jiraiya, Caveman Guu and Two Hoses, were translated into English by Massive Goods in 2013 and 2017, respectively.

=== Fashion ===
In addition to publishing, Jiraiya has collaborated with multiple fashion houses to release products featuring his artwork. In June 2014, Opening Ceremony launched a line of products featuring Jiraiya's artwork for Pride Month, including apparel, accessories, and a Tenga sex toy. A t-shirt collaboration between Jiraiya, Massive, and Mission Chinese Food was also launched that same year. In 2015, Opening Ceremony and Jiraiya released a second collaboration, titled "Power-Up Massive". Pretty Snake, a fashion brand founded by Project Runway contestant Joe Segal, launched a line of swim briefs with artwork by Jiraiya in 2015.

=== "The Best Couple" ===
In November 2013, Massive Goods released "The Best Couple," a sweatshirt featuring an illustration of two original characters created by Jiraiya, Asakichi (朝吉) and Seiji (清次). The characters would later appear as the subjects of "LOVE IS MASSIVE", a 2016 illustration created by Jiraiya to raise funds for the victims of the Orlando nightclub shooting. Two Hoses, a 2017 dōjinshi by Jiraiya, outlines the backstory of The Best Couple as two firefighters drawn together by a near-death experience.

== Impact ==
Along with Gengoroh Tagame, Jiraiya is regarded as one of the most influential and prolific creators of gay manga; Anne Ishii, the co-founder of Massive Goods, has stated that "if Tagame is the dark father of Japanese gay manga, Jiraiya is the fairy godmother." He has been compared to Tom of Finland in reference to the cultural impact of his work, and Martin Margiela in reference to his reclusiveness. His art has been praised for depicting East Asian men as physically strong and sexually desirable, subverting stereotypical portrayals of East Asian men as emasculated and asexual. His fashion designs have gained popularity in the LGBTQ hip hop scene, and have been worn by Tinashe, Cazwell, and Blood Orange.

== Bibliography ==
=== Manga ===
G-men

- "Festival of the Tatsukobe Temple" (竜首神社例大祭奉納神楽), issue 46, November 1999
- "The Smell of Indigo" (藍の匂い), issue 50, March 2000
- "Feast of Fishery" (大漁旗ゆれた), issue 53, June 2000
- "Sumo Wrestling Ceremony of Yatsukichi Temple" (八吉神社例大祭奉納相撲), issue 56, September 2000
- "Undercover Lover" (恋女房), issue 59, December 2000
- "Promise" (約束), issue 62, March 2001
- "Room for Five Guys" (五人部屋), issue 65, June 2001
- "Harbor Festival Passion" (港祭天狗岩御縄飾), issue 68, September 2001
- "My Father’s Boyfriend, Part 1" (親父の恋人【前編】), issue 72, January 2002
- "My Father’s Boyfriend, Part 2" (親父の恋人【後編】), issue 73, February 2002
- "Goro" (五郎), issue 77, June 2002
- "Toro the Crybaby" (泣き虫トロ), issue 89, June 2003
- "Kaaatsu!" (喝っ!), issue 96, January 2004
- "800-lb Chubby Hyakutaro" (百貫でぶの百太郎), issue 100, July 2004
- "Song of Gratitude" (仰ゲバ尊シ, Aogeba Toutoshi), issue 112, May 2005
- "Umihiko and Yamahiko" (海彦山彦), issue 125, June 2006
- "Stray Dog Jiro" (野良犬ジロー), issue 130, November 2006
- "The Story of the Fujino Bathhouse on Third Street in Kibou City" (希望町三丁目 富士乃湯物語), issue 139, August 2007
- "Secret" (秘密), issue 150, July 2008
- "Three Crows" (三羽のカラス), issue 156, January 2009
- "Kinta's Balls" (金太のキンタマ), issue 172, May 2010
- "Whichever Way the Wind Blows" (つむじ風どこへ吹く), issue 181, February 2011
- "Beware of Fire!!" (火のー用ー心!!), issue 196, May 2012
- "Momotarou vs. Nitaro" (百太郎 対 二百太郎), issue 200, November 2012
- "Midday Fireworks" (真昼の花火), issue 210, July 2013
- "Blue Sky Thunderhead Shower, Part 1" (青い空 入道雲 通り雨【前編】), issue 216, January 2014
- "Blue Sky Thunderhead Shower, Part 2" (青い空 入道雲 通り雨【後編】), issue 217, February 2014
- "The Lovers' Common Exchange" (恋人たちのありふれたやりとり), issue 216, September 2015

Bakudan

- "The House of Gengoro Kimura" (木村厳五郎一家), vol. 1–6, October 2004-February 2006

Gekidan

- "It's Tough Being An Adviser" (顧問はつらいよ), vol. 7, December 2006

Kinniku-Kei

- "Training Room" (格技室), vol. 1, August 2007
- "Demon in the Storehouse" (蔵の中の鬼), vol. 2, November 2007
- "Ten Ninja of Sanada: One Night of Travel" (真田十勇士 旅の一夜), vol. 5, October 2008

G-Bless

- "In the Hole" (坑ん中), vol. 1, February 2009

Comic G.G.

- "The CEO's Toy" (課長玩具), issue 2, May 2011
- "The Mountain and the White Sake" (オンヤマさんと白い酒), issue 6, May 2012

Otoko-Matsuri

- "22 Year Old Beast" (獣太22歳), vol. 2, June 2017

Dōjinshi

- "Caveman Guu" (縄文人グウ)
  - English edition published by Massive Goods, May 2014
  - Japanese edition published by BIG GYM, 7 March 2015
- "Two Hoses" (ホースが2本)
  - English edition published by Massive Goods, 14 February 2017
  - Japanese edition published by BIG GYM, 14 February 2017
- "Yokozuna-sensei" (ヨコヅナ先生), BIG GYM, 27 April 2019

=== Collected editions ===
Room for Five Guys (児雷也, Gonin Beya), Furukawa Shobo, 21 December 2004, ISBN 978-4-89236-313-9

- collects "Room for Five Guys", "Festival of the Tatsukobe Temple", "The Smell of Indigo", "Sumo Wrestling Ceremony of Yatsukichi Temple", "Feast of Fishery", "My Father’s Boyfriend", "Undercover Lover", "Undercover Lover After That", "Goro", "Promise", and "Room for Five Guys: HARD MIX"

Song of Gratitude (仰ゲバ尊シ, Aogeba Toutoshi), Furukawa Shobo, 16 January 2007, ISBN 978-489236-368-9

- Song of Gratitude New Edition (仰ゲバ尊シ 新装版), Furukawa Shobo, 21 August 2015, ISBN 978-4-89236-502-7

- collects "The House of Gengoro Kimura", "Song of Gratitude", "Toro the Crybaby", "Kaaatsu!", "800-lb Chubby Hyakutaro", "Umihiko and Yamahiko", and "Stray Dog Jiro"

Three Crows (三羽のカラス, Sanba no Karasu), Furukawa Shobo, 17 April 2009, ISBN 978-489236-427-3

- Three Crows Special! (三羽のカラス 特盛り！), Furukawa Shobo, 20 November 2012, ISBN 978-489236-469-3
- Three Crows Special! New Edition (三羽のカラス 特盛り！ 新装版), Furukawa Shobo, 19 May 2015, ISBN 978-4-89236-496-9

- collects "The Three Crows Episode of Purity", "Three Crows", "It's Tough Being An Adviser", "The Story of the Fujino Bathhouse on Third Street in Kibou City", "Training Room", "Demon in the Storehouse", "Secret", "Ten Ninja of Sanada: One Night of Travel", "In The Hole", "Kinta's Balls", "Whichever Way the Wind Blows", "The CEO's Toy", "The Mountain and the White Sake", "Beware of Fire!!", "Momotarou vs. Nitaro", and "The Three Crows VS Secret"

=== Art books ===
- The Art of Jiraiya, H & O Éditions, 2007, ISBN 978-2-84547-145-0
- Art Works of Jiraiya 1998-2012, Furukawa Shobou, 2012, ISBN 978-4-89236-463-1
