= My Brother's Husband =

Manga series by Gengoroh Tagame

- The cover of the first volume of My Brother's Husband. From left to right: Mike, Kana, and Yaichi.

弟の夫 (Otōto no Otto)
- Genre: Drama
- Manga
- Written by: Gengoroh Tagame
- Published by: Futabasha
- English publisher: NA: Pantheon Books
- Magazine: Monthly Action
- Original run: November 2014 – May 2017
- Volumes: 4
- Television drama
- Directed by: Teruyuki Yoshida; Yukihiro Toda
- Produced by: Keiko Ogata
- Written by: Yukihiro Toda
- Studio: NHK
- Original network: NHK BS Premium
- Original run: March 4, 2018 – March 18, 2018
- Episodes: 3

My Brother's Husband (Japanese: 弟の夫, Hepburn: Otōto no Otto) is a manga series by Gengoroh Tagame. Serialized in Monthly Action from 2014 to 2017, and adapted into a live-action television drama by NHK in 2018, the series follows the relationship between single father Yaichi, his daughter Kana, and Mike Flanagan, the Canadian husband of Yaichi's estranged and recently deceased twin brother.

The series, which focuses on themes of homophobia, cultural difference, and family, has been noted as a significant departure from Tagame's previous works, which focus on erotic and sadomasochistic subject material. My Brother's Husband has received overwhelming acclaim from critics, and has won an Eisner Award for Best U.S. Edition of International Material—Asia, a Japan Media Arts Award, and a Japan Cartoonists Association Award.

== Plot ==
Yaichi, a stay-at-home single father, lives with his daughter Kana in suburban Tokyo. They are visited by Mike Flanagan, the widower of Yaichi's estranged twin brother Ryōji, who has traveled from his native Canada for three weeks to learn about Ryōji's past. Kana is fascinated by Mike and is immediately accepting of him, though Yaichi is hesitant to accept Mike as family.

While Yaichi is not overtly homophobic, Mike suggests that his tacit discomfort over his brother's sexuality drove a wedge between them that led to their estrangement. Mike's interactions with the family and neighborhood over the subsequent three weeks prompt Yaichi to confront his own prejudices around sex and sexuality, as his growing tolerance and eventual acceptance of Mike parallel his overcoming of his own homophobia.

Shortly before Mike's departure, he reveals to Yaichi that Ryōji expressed guilt over never reconciling his relationship with his brother, and promised Mike that they would one day travel to Japan as a couple to meet his family. As Ryōji died before the promise could be fulfilled, Mike traveled to Japan alone so that he could honor Ryōji's wish of becoming family with Yaichi. Yaichi and Kana bid Mike goodbye as family, and he returns to Canada.

== Characters ==
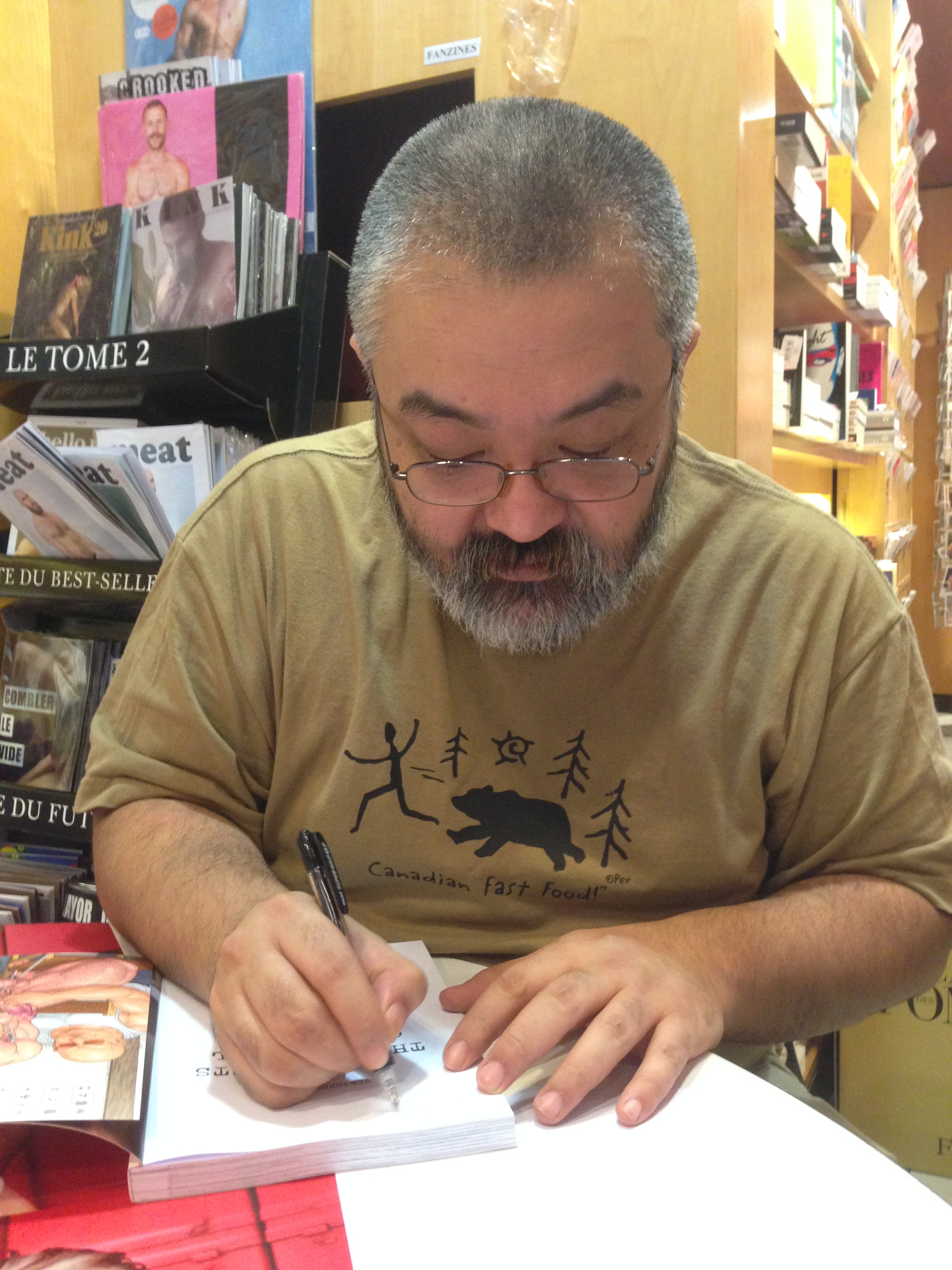
Gengoroh Tagame, author of My Brother's Husband.

Yaichi Origuchi (折口 弥一, Origuchi Yaichi)
The protagonist of the series. A single, stay-at-home father to Kana, he works as the landlord of an apartment building left to him by his parents. Following the death of his estranged twin brother Ryōji, he begrudgingly allows his brother's widower Mike Flanagan to stay in his home as he visits Japan. Through his interactions with Mike, Yaichi is able to overcome his implicit homophobia, and realize that his silent discomfort over his brother's sexuality led to their estrangement.
Mike Flanagan (マイク・フラナガン, Maiku Furanagan)
The Canadian husband of Yaichi's dead brother Ryōji, who visits Japan to learn about his late husband's past and family. Mike is kind and gentle, contrasting with his muscular and bearish appearance, and a self-professed Japanophile. He is proudly gay and is frequently depicted wearing t-shirts that feature LGBT iconography, such as the rainbow flag and pink triangle.
Kana Origuchi (折口 夏菜, Origuchi Kana)
Yaichi's daughter. Though she was unaware of Mike's existence prior to his visit, she is immediately accepting of him; her unconditional love of Mike frequently contrasts Yaichi's more complicated feelings about his brother-in-law. Kana misses living with her mother, but attempts to hide her loneliness from her father, prompting him to include her mother more in her life.
Natsuki (夏樹)
Yaichi's ex-wife, and the mother of Kana. Though the cause of their divorce is never specified, Yaichi claims fault for the breakdown of their marriage; despite this, they maintain an amicable friendship. Natsuki is accepting of Mike, and helps Yaichi to understand the persistence of homophobia in Japan.
Ryoji (涼二, Ryōji)
Yaichi's twin brother, and the husband of Mike Flanagan. Ryōji came out to his brother as a teenager, though Yaichi's discomfort over his homosexuality led to the fracturing of their relationship and eventual estrangement. As the series opens, it has been ten years since Ryōji last spoke to Yaichi before leaving Japan for Canada, and one month since his death in an unspecified accident. Ryōji had previously promised to Mike that they would one day visit Japan, so that he could introduce Mike to Yaichi and mend his relationship with his brother. Ryōji's inability to fulfill that promise prior to his death prompts Mike's solo trip to Japan.
Yuki Shinohara (篠原 結姫, Shinohara Yuki)
Kana's schoolmate. Yaichi calls her an omasesan – a child who acts like an adult – due to her maturity in understanding Mike's sexuality. Her mother initially forbids Yuki from seeing Mike, believing him to be a negative influence.
Tomoya Ogawa (小川 知哉, Ogawa Tomoya)
Kana's schoolmate. He has neither knowledge of, nor interest in, Mike's sexuality.
Kazuya Ogawa (小川 一哉, Ogawa Kazuya)
Tomoya's closeted older brother, who becomes friends with Mike after coming out to him.
Kato (加藤, Katō) or Katoyan (カトヤン)
Ryōji's friend from high school. He reveals to Mike that he is gay, and that while he had a platonic friendship with Ryōji based on their shared sexuality, he secretly harbored unrequited romantic feelings for him. Katō is closeted, and tells Mike that he intends to never come out.
Mr. Yokoyama (横山先生, Yokoyama-sensei)
Kana's homeroom teacher.

== Media ==
=== Manga ===
My Brother's Husband was serialized in Futabasha's seinen manga magazine Monthly Action from November 2014 to May 2017, and later published as four tankōbon. An English-language translation by Anne Ishii was released as two omnibus editions, published by Pantheon Books in North America and Blackfriars in the United Kingdom. A French-language translation was licensed in France by Delcourt, under its Akata label.

No.	Original release date	Original ISBN	English release date	English ISBN
1	May 25, 2015	978-4575846256	May 2, 2017	978-1101871515
2	January 12, 2016	978-4575847413	May 2, 2017	978-1101871515
3	October 12, 2016	978-4575848632	September 18, 2018	978-1101871539
4	July 12, 2017	978-4575850055	September 18, 2018	978-1101871539

=== Live-action television drama ===
A three-episode live-action adaptation of My Brother's Husband was announced in December 2017, and aired in March 2018. The series, which was directed by Teruyuki Yoshida and Yukihiro Toda, starred Ryuta Sato as Yaichi and Baruto Kaito as Mike, aired on NHK BS Premium.

No.	Title	Directed by	Written by	Original release date
1	"First" "Daiikkai" (第一回)	Teruyuki Yoshida	Yukihiro Toda	4 March 2018
2	"Second" "Dainikai" (第二回)	Teruyuki Yoshida	Yukihiro Toda	11 March 2018
3	"Final" "Saishūkai" (最終回)	Teruyuki Yoshida	Yukihiro Toda	18 March 2018

== Reception ==
=== Critical response ===
James Yeh of Vice commented on how the series deals with the issue of gay marriage, which is unrecognized in Japan, and wrote that Tagame's artwork, writing and muscular male characters make My Brother's Husband "a beautiful, stirring, and deeply human work".

Rachel Cooke wrote in The Guardian that "Not only is it very touching; it's also, for the non-Japanese reader, unexpectedly fascinating."

Charles Pulliam-Moore, writing for io9, commented on how the manga deals with homophobia in modern-day Japan, saying that, "My Brother's Husband gently alludes to the sort of small, everyday aspects of homophobia that ultimately drove Yaichi's brother to leave" and that: "The message the Tagame's trying to get across—that quiet, subtle bigotry can be just as harmful as loud, bombastic bigotry—isn't always an easy one to process. Tagame understands that and hopefully, as the rest of the book unfolds, readers will too."

Rebecca Silverman praised the series in Anime News Network, giving it an A− grade, writing:

My Brother's Husband is an honest, quietly emotional look at how prejudices and preconceptions can hurt not only the people we're biased against, but also ourselves. Both heartbreaking and heartwarming, this first volume is well worth reading, and Tagame's solid, clean artwork with attention to details like body hair that we don't often see in mainstream manga, help to ground the story in reality. It's the kind of book that you can devour in one sitting but wish that you didn't – not only because there's so much to think about, but also because it's good enough that you don't actually want it to end.

However, Silverman criticized the length of time it takes for Mike to develop as a character, and some issues with the artwork.

Ian Wolf gave the series 10 out of 10 in MyM, commenting positively on how the manga manages to confront homophobia, and how it stands out from most LGBT-themed manga released in English, which are normally yaoi series depicting bishōnen.

American comics author Alison Bechdel praised the comic.

The French edition has been reviewed by a prominent gay magazine, Têtu, which regarded Tagame's foray into gay rights positively.

=== Accolades ===
My Brother's Husband received an Excellence Prize at the 19th Japan Media Arts Festival in 2015. In December 2016, the French edition of the manga was nominated for the "Best Comic" at the 44th annual Angoulême International Comics Festival. In 2018, it received the Excellence Award at the 47th Japan Cartoonists Association Award. The first volume of the Pantheon edition of the manga won the 2018 Eisner Award for Best U.S. Edition of International Material—Asia. The Young Adult Library Services Association listed the English edition of the manga as one of their Top 10 2018 Great Graphic Novels for Teens.
