= Badi (magazine) =

Japanese magazine for gay men

Badi バディ
- Cover of the June 2018 issue
- Categories: Gay lifestyle
- Frequency: Monthly
- Publisher: Terra Publications
- Founded: November 1994
- First issue: January 1995
- Final issue: March 2019
- Country: Japan
- Language: Japanese
- Website: www.badi.jp

Badi, stylized as Bʌ́di (バディ), was a monthly Japanese magazine for gay men. Established in November 1994 by Terra Publications, the first edition was released in January 1995. The title comes from the Japanese pronunciation of "buddy".

== Overview ==
The primary demographic of Badi was younger men (and admirers of younger men). The magazine featured articles on fashion, health, and relationships; community news and event listings; and stories and images in both photographic and gay manga formats. Issues of Badi were approximately 500–1000 pages, including several pages of glossy colour. Though the magazine included pornographic pictures and stories, Badi was not mainly a pornographic magazine.

== Advertisement ==
There was also a personal ad section, as well as advertisements from gay-related and gay-friendly businesses such as spas, clubs and hotels, bars, cafes and restaurants, host bars (hustler bars), brothels, and retail shops.

Badi announced in December 2018 that it would be folding, with the final issue to be published in March 2019.
