= Gengoroh Tagame =

Japanese manga artist (born 1964)

- 田亀 源五郎
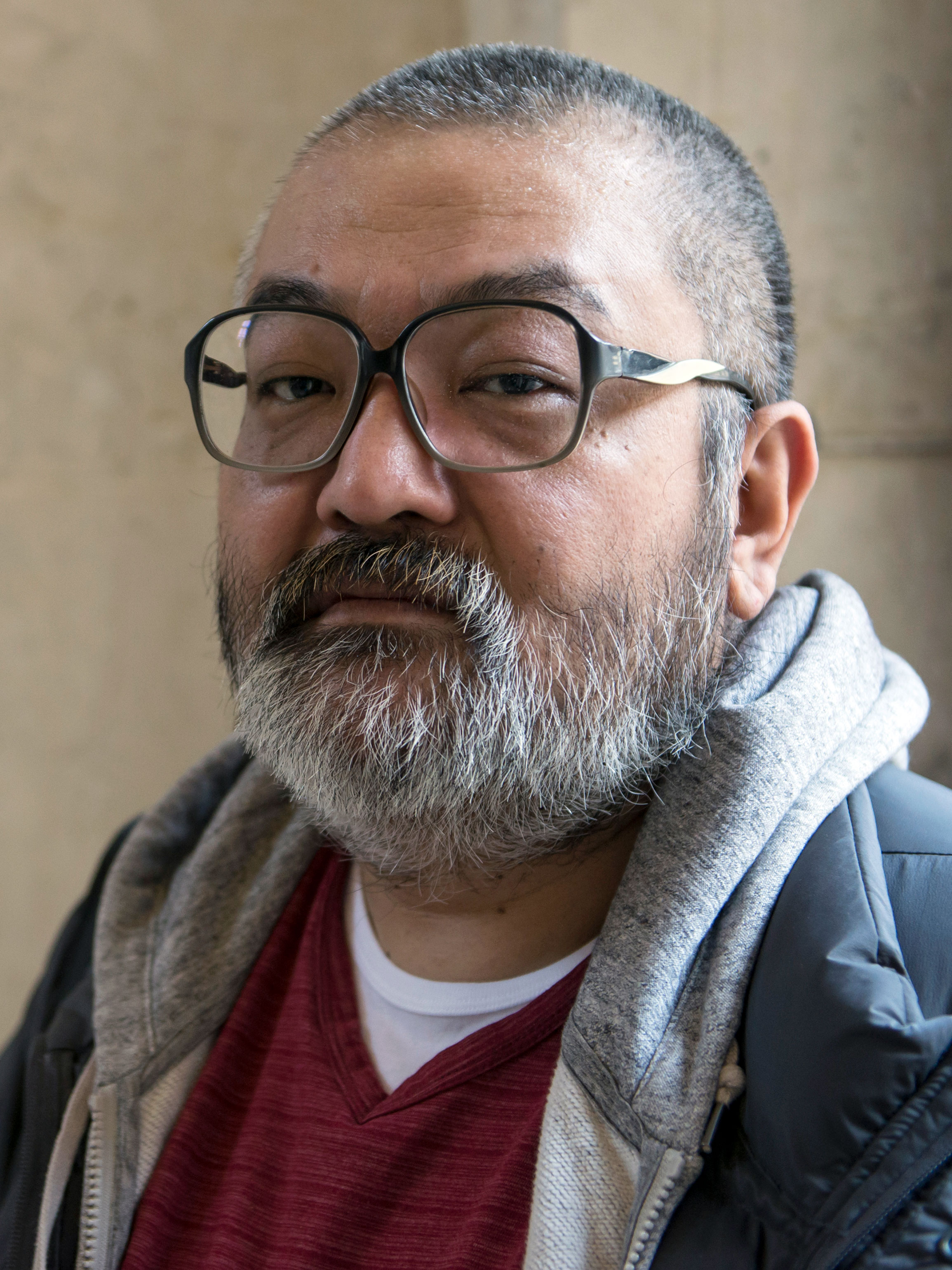
- Tagame at the Angoulême International Comics Festival in 2017
- Born: February 3, 1964 (age 62); Kamakura, Kanagawa Prefecture, Japan
- Known for: Gay manga
- Awards: Japan Media Arts Festival Award (2015), Japan Cartoonists Association Award (2018), Eisner Award (2018)
- Website: tagame.org

Gengoroh Tagame (田亀 源五郎, Tagame Gengorō; born February 3, 1964) is a pseudonymous Japanese manga artist. He is regarded as the most prolific and influential creator in the gay manga genre. Tagame began contributing manga and prose fiction to Japanese gay men's magazines in the 1980s, after making his debut as a manga artist in the yaoi (male-male romance) manga magazine June while in high school. As a student he studied graphic design at Tama Art University, and worked as a commercial graphic designer and art director to support his career as a manga artist. His manga series The Toyed Man (嬲り者, Naburi-Mono), originally serialized in the gay men's magazine Badi from 1992 to 1993, enjoyed breakout success after it was published as a book in 1994. After co-founding the gay men's magazine G-men in 1995, Tagame began working as a gay manga artist full-time.

For much of his career Tagame exclusively created erotic and pornographic manga, works that are distinguished by their graphic depictions of sadomasochism, sexual violence, and hypermasculinity. Beginning in the 2010s, Tagame gained mainstream recognition after he began to concurrently produce non-pornographic manga depicting LGBT themes and subject material; his 2014 manga series My Brother's Husband, his first series aimed at a general audience, received widespread critical acclaim and was awarded a Japan Media Arts Festival Prize, a Japan Cartoonists Association Award, and an Eisner Award. Tagame is further noted for his contributions as an art historian, through his multi-volume art anthology series Gay Erotic Art in Japan.

== Biography ==
=== Early life and career ===
Tagame was born in Kamakura on February 3, 1964, into a family distantly descended from samurai. The younger of two brothers, Tagame was forbidden from reading manga as a child with the exception of the works of Osamu Tezuka, which his parents believed had literary merit. He became exposed to a broader array of manga by reading shōnen (boys' comics) stories in barber shop waiting rooms, notably the works of horror authors Kazuo Umezu and Go Nagai, whose manga often featured violent and sexual themes. He began drawing as a child, and by middle school was drawing amateur comics for his classmates and teachers. In his early teens he began drawing pornographic manga after reading novels by the Marquis de Sade and discovering the magazine Renaissance, which re-printed material from underground BDSM manga zines; Tagame has remarked that he discovered his interest in BDSM before he realized he was gay.

He became aware of his homosexuality after watching films featuring "naked and bound men" (such as the Italian Hercules series and Charlton Heston in Planet of the Apes) and discovering the gay men's magazine Sabu. He found that he was uninterested in stories in Sabu focused on romance, and drawn to stories that focused on sadomasochism. In high school Tagame began writing manga professionally, and contributed to the manga magazine June in 1982 under a pen name. June was a yaoi (male-male romance manga, also known as boys' love or BL) magazine that targeted a primarily female readership, and was noted for its avant-garde stories with complex plots and social realism; Tagame's first story in June focused on a "pretty boy who cross dresses" whose father is murdered by his boyfriend. Tagame struggled with his sexuality and interest in sadomasochism through high school, and did not come out until his freshman year of college. He came out to his parents later when, during a trip abroad, he sent them an email using his pseudonym, and upon returning to Japan his father searched for said pseudonym and found his biography on Wikipedia, where he was described as a gay erotic artist.

Upon graduating high school Tagame moved to Tokyo to study graphic design at Tama Art University against the wishes of his parents, who expected him to attend the University of Tokyo and become a banker. Throughout college he submitted gay erotic stories, illustrations, and manga to Barazoku, René, and other gay and BL magazines under a variety of pseudonyms. He eventually settled on the pen name "Gengoroh Tagame"; both words are Japanese terms for different species of water bugs, which Tagame chose to differentiate himself from the "macho or romantic" pen names used by other gay Japanese artists. While on a student art tour of Europe, Tagame discovered the American leather magazine Drummer at a bookshop in London. The magazine featured homoerotic and fetishistic illustrations by western artists such as Tom of Finland, Rex, and Bill Ward, and would heavily influence Tagame's art. After graduating university he began to work as a commercial graphic designer and later art director, while continuing to write manga and prose fiction.

=== Gay erotic manga ===
The 1980s saw an increase in the popularity of gay media in Japan, a trend inspired by the cultural importation of works by American gay artists such as Robert Mapplethorpe and Edmund White. As Japanese publishers sought to exploit this new interest in gay art created by gay artists, Tagame emerged as an influential artist on the basis of his work at June, Barazoku, and other magazines. Tagame made his debut as a gay erotic manga artist in 1987, creating manga for Sabu. In contrast to the heterosexual and female-oriented yaoi and BL magazines that had published Tagame's previous works, Sabu was produced by gay men for a gay male audience. His manga series The Toyed Man (嬲り者, Naburi-Mono), originally serialized in the gay men's magazine Badi from 1992 to 1993, was published as a book in 1994 and became the first gay comic work in Japan to turn a profit. The breakout success of The Toyed Man demonstrated the viability of gay manga – manga about gay relationships for a gay male audience, in contrast to yaoi – as a commercial category, and established it as a genre "of cultural merit and artistic importance." Tagame's second longform series, the 824-page, three-volume historical epic The Silver Flower (男女郎苦界草紙～銀の華, Shirogane-no-Hana), is noted by Graham Kolbeins as widening "the scope of what gay manga could be narratively" beyond stories focused largely on pornography to incorporate complex narrative and aesthetic elements.

In 1995, Tagame and two editors from Badi founded the gay men's magazine G-men, a shorthand for "Gengoroh's Men". The magazine focused on works depicting masculine, physically large men, and featured manga depicting older and muscular body types. G-men was part of a concerted effort by Tagame to "change the status quo of gay magazines" away from the aesthetic of bishōnen – delicate and androgynous boys and young men that were popular in gay media at the time. G-men was a success, and by 1996, Tagame was working full-time as a gay manga artist. The magazine serialized the bulk of Tagame's manga published during the 1990s and early 2000s, notably Do You Remember the South Island's POW Camp? and Pride. Tagame continued to publish his serialized manga as books during this period, initially through gay pornography production companies, and later through formal publishers. Beginning in 2003, Tagame began publishing the multi-volume gay erotic art anthology series Gay Erotic Art in Japan, which follows the history of Japanese gay erotic art from the 1950s to the present.

=== International and crossover success ===
Tagame attracted an international audience beginning in the 2000s though the circulation of pirated and scanlated versions of his works. His works began to receive officially-licensed translations in 2005, after French publisher H&O Editions released a translation of his manga series Gunji; an exhibition of his works was held in Paris in 2009. In 2012, an English-language translation of Tagame's one-shot manga Standing Ovations was published in Thickness, an erotic comics anthology published by Ryan Sands and Michael DeForge, marking the first release of an officially-licensed English-language translation of Tagame's manga. American publisher PictureBox published The Passion of Gengoroh Tagame, an English-language anthology of Tagame's manga, in 2013; several of Tagame's works were also translated into English by the now-defunct publishing house Bruno Gmünder Verlag.

In 2013, Tagame was approached by editors at the publishing company Futabasha about creating a manga series for general audiences. Though Tagame had previously been approached by mainstream manga magazines about creating a non-pornographic autobiographical manga series, he had declined the offers, stating that he "didn't want to abandon my style and my audience by writing a more mainstream work." Beginning in the early 2010s, Tagame noted that while same-sex marriage was rarely covered in the mainstream Japanese press, the issue generated significant interest among his heterosexual fans when he posted about the topic on his Twitter account. Subsequently, Tagame pitched Futabasha for a series about same-sex marriage and LGBT rights in Japan from the perspective of a straight character; the resulting series was My Brother's Husband, which was serialized in the seinen (manga for young adult men) magazine Monthly Action from 2014 to 2017. The series was widely acclaimed, won numerous awards, and was adapted into a live-action television drama that aired on NHK in 2018.

Tagame has continued to create erotic manga concurrently with all-ages manga, stating that the experience of creating My Brother's Husband made him "realize how much fun [all-ages manga] is to draw" and that balancing the creation of erotic works with the creation of all-ages works was "very healthy for me, mentally." Our Colors, his second series aimed at a general audience, was serialized in Monthly Action from 2018 to 2020. His third general audience manga series, Fish and Water, began serialization in Futabasha's Web Action in 2022.

== Style and influences ==
An interview with Tagame by Anne Ishii and Graham Kolbeins, where he discusses his use of sci-fi, fantasy and historical fiction to portray "new worlds of S&M" in his manga

Tagame describes his style as kuma-kei (熊系; lit. "bear type"), a term he uses to describe the masculine, muscular, and hirsute men that he draws. Sex is typically the primary focus of Tagame's manga and his works are almost invariably fetishistic in nature, featuring depictions of bondage, discipline, leather, fisting and sadomasochism. These themes are often amplified through his use of science fiction, fantasy, and historical fiction to create surreal and hyperreal sexual scenarios. Tagame has acknowledged that his manga "represents a very small minority of the world. In the real world, the large majority of people don't like torture in their sex lives, invariably. But I'm not writing for them." Tagame sparingly depicts extreme fetishistic material in work such as coprophilia or graphic violence, noting that the primary purpose of his pornographic works is to inspire sexual excitement and not disgust.

While comic art featuring sexualized depictions of masculine men is not unique to Tagame, academic William Armour argues that his works are distinguished from his peers through his interest "in the way in which power relationships between men can be eroticised." His manga have been noted for their aesthetic qualities and psychological complexity, with Armour writing that "while on one level Tagame presents stories as graphic cartoon porn, on another level he weaves into the images and wording a much deeper sense of how homosociality can easily transform into homosexuality, despite his male characters being positioned as examples of hegemonic masculinity." Tagame himself has stated that "what I have tried to do in my erotica is raise that to the level of art and think about it in terms of art being principally to the service of depicting humanity."

While the majority of gay manga artists produce works targeting a gay male audience exclusively, Tagame is noted for having a significant heterosexual and female audience. Tagame has stated that he adjusts his style if a work is being published in a format where it will be primarily read by a specific subset of his audience, noting that "when I write for gay men's magazines, it's primarily about the hero's initiative and interiority. When I know that women are also going to be reading it [...] they're more interested in seeing actual relationships and coupling." In considering why Tagame's works attract a diverse audience, Anne Ishii hypothesizes that "something about what Tagame does isn't even about being gay [...] it's about desire and the darker side of desire. It doesn't fit into a sexual category to me."

Tagame credits both Japanese and Western artists among his influences, including Caravaggio, Michelangelo, the Marquis de Sade, Tsukioka Yoshitoshi, Go Mishima, Sanshi Funayama, Oda Toshimi, Suehiro Maruo, Kazuichi Hanawa, Hiromi Hiraguchi, and Bill Ward. Nude figures in Hellenistic and Baroque art, initially encountered by Tagame in classic art anthologies he read as a child, heavily influenced his works. In considering his Western and Japanese influences, Tagame notes that Western Christian art has inspired his depictions of nudity and humiliation (such as Caravaggio's depictions of the crucifixion of Christ), whereas Japanese classical art such as shunga (woodcut erotic art originating in the Edo period) has inspired his depictions of violence.

== Themes and motifs ==
=== Hypermasculinity ===
The majority of Tagame's works depict men with personal and physical traits associated with hypermasculinity – developed muscles, hirsute bodies, large penises, an exaggerated volume of ejaculate, machismo, and participation in extreme or violent sexual acts. Tagame has stated that he is interested in how men who are perceived as masculine "respond to societal pressure" and "perform their manliness beyond what's necessary," and how those attitudes change "if a man loses his manliness [...] by participating in activity that normative society believes men would not normally participate in." Armour identifies Pride, which depicts a dominant university student who is trained into submission by his sadistic professor, and The Gamefowl in Darkness, which is inspired by Yasujirō Ozu's A Hen in the Wind and Edogawa Ranpo's The Caterpillar, as representative examples of hypermasculine themes in Tagame's works.

Tagame's artwork is often associated with bara, a colloquialism used by non-Japanese audiences to refer to Japanese erotic art featuring masculine men. Tagame has rejected this association, citing the term's historical use as a pejorative for gay men (Note: The term bara (薔薇), which translates literally to "rose" in Japanese, is roughly equivalent to the English language pejorative "pansy" used to refer to gay men.) and calling it "a very negative word that comes with bad connotations." Tagame's works are often categorized alongside the "macho" gay art movement associated with artists such as Tom of Finland, which emerged in American biker culture in the early 1960s and was later adapted by gay men to counter stereotypes of effeteness and emasculation. Designer Chip Kidd has contested this association, arguing that "as delightfully sturdy and game as Tom of Finland’s characters depicted, they never quite seem alive. Tagame’s characters are, by vivid contrast, almost unbearably so."

Edmund White argues that the hypermasculine ideal Tagame depicts is more categorically similar to Meiji period literature, specifically the character archetype of a man "who was homosexual because he was uncouth, not refined enough to be heterosexual and to please women, a warrior, a peasant from the south, not fit for decent society." Armour notes that Tagame's works are distinguished from his Western gay comic peers through his subversion of stereotypical portrayals of East Asian men as emasculated and asexual, writing that "while there seems little difference in how Tagame’s men are drawn and how male characters in Western erotic gay comics are depicted [...] from a white, Western viewpoint, Tagame's depiction of hyper-masculine Japanese men can be considered to break down the stereotype within many Western gay cultures that Asian men in general are skinny, small-dicked, effete weaklings who are fucked for the pleasure of big-dicked, buff macho white guy."

=== Sadomasochism and sexual violence ===
Though not all sexual depictions in Tagame's manga involve sadomasochism and sexual violence, it is a common theme in his work, with White writing that "in Gengoroh Tagame's world, no man is ever penetrated willingly." Tagame's BDSM-focused works often depict other taboo subject material, such as rape, bestiality, incest, and body modification. Despite the often graphic subjects of his works, critics have generally not considered Tagame's art as ero guro, or "erotic grotesque" art that focuses on material that is disgusting or horrific. Rather than depict gore and horror overtly, Tagame states that he draws inspiration for his BDSM stories from Shakespearean tragedy, German opera, and Japanese folktales that depict the "beauty of destruction" and a "person who’s falling apart". For example, in his manga Missing, a man frees his kidnapped brother by killing the corrupt military officers who have captured him, though the murderous act is intentionally not directly depicted.

Tagame's works focused on BDSM frequently depict a protagonist who goes through a process of self-discovery as a result of his participation in a BDSM or otherwise fetishistic relationship. Most often, these stories involve a masculine man whose engagement with BDSM transforms him from a dominant to a submissive sexual role, such as stories featuring "alpha" men who are sexually dominated and tortured or who allow themselves to be sexually debased out of a sense of responsibility or duty. Kolbeins argues that by depicting BDSM as a process of self-discovery, Tagame's stores are framed "within a relatable framework of human drama," while Kidd notes that "a typical Tagame character can be seen as the ultimate mature brute symbol of authority for whom the tide has abruptly turned." Examples of these themes include Endless Game, where a man taken as a sex slave comes to enjoy his new status and forces his captors to obey his desires, and Arena, where a Japanese karate champion becomes involved in an American fighting tournament where the winner of each match sodomizes the loser.

=== Japanese traditionalism ===
Tagame's works often depict Japanese historical settings, or draw heavily on traditional Japanese aesthetics in plot or subject material. While homosexuality has a history in Japan dating to ancient times, the country shifted away from a tolerance of homosexuality amid Westernization during the Meiji era (1868–1912), and forms of gay expression that were once accepted became pathologized and criminalized. This tension between traditionalism and modernism manifests in Tagame's erotic manga through his rendering of hierarchies, such as works that focus on the patriarchal nature of Japanese society, or samurai characters that serve as symbolic representations of an unjust feudal order. Tagame has stated that he is "fascinated by how these hierarchies fail," describing his simultaneous frustration and attraction to hierarchies associated with Japanese traditionalism thusly:

Falling from hierarchy is the ultimate act of sadomasochism. I find the Japanese ideas of beauty and tradition unappealing conceptually, but as an element of fiction, I feel extraordinary Eros in the destruction of those principles.

One of Tagame's earliest long-form serialized works was The Silver Flower, a historical drama set in the Edo period that follows a formerly wealthy businessman who is forced into sexual slavery in order to resolve a debt. Through the course of the abuse and humiliation he endures at the hands of his male clients, the character comes to realize that he is a masochist; Kolbeins notes that the series "examines a time when male-male sexuality flourished in Japanese society, unfettered by Western notions of sin and 'sodomy'." In Country Doctor, which focuses on a pre-modern Japanese village where western-imposed taboos on sex are absent, Tagame states that he seeks to "spin on its head is this idea that we think people were more conservative in the past and are more liberated in the present."

Themes of traditionalism similarly manifest in Tagame's all-ages manga, albeit in a non-sexual context, through their examination of contemporary Japanese social attitudes towards homosexuality. In My Brother's Husband, protagonist Yaichi is forced to examine his own preconceived notions about gay people after meeting the husband of his deceased twin brother, with his initial homophobia mirroring the prevalent conservative attitudes towards LGBT rights in Japan. Tagame notes that Yaichi's character arc towards tolerance and acceptance further mirrors themes in his BDSM manga, where characters are faced with a choice between acceptance of reality or the denial of their own desires and happiness.

== Works ==
=== Manga ===
The following is a list of Tagame's serialized and one-shot manga works. Serializations refer to multi-chapter works that are typically later published as collected editions (tankōbon), while one-shots refer to single-chapter works that are sometimes later collected in anthologies.

Serializations & one-shots

Year	English title	Original title	Type	Magazine	Collected edition / Anthology
1987	The Judo Master	柔術教師 (Jujitsu-Kyoshi)	One-shot	Sabu	—
1987	The SM Bathhouse	淫虐浴場 (Ingyaku-Yokujo)	One-shot	Sabu	—
1988	The Slave Trainer	調教師 (Chokyoshi)	One-shot	Sabu	—
1988	The Fallen Rugby Player	ラガー失墜 (Raga-Shittsui)	One-shot	Sabu	—
1988	The Midnight Business	深夜営業 (Shinya-Eigyo)	One-shot	Sabu	—
1989	The Boxer	BOXER～栄光の代償	One-shot	Sabu	—
1990	The Song for Defeated Samurai	敗将賦 (Haisho-fu)	One-shot	Sabu	—
1990	The Rasp	軋む男 (Kishimu-Otoko)	Serialization	Sabu	The Judo Master
1990	The Ceremony	儀式 (Gishiki)	One-shot	Sabu	—
1990	The Slave Trainer 2	調教師～オーダーメイドされた男 (Chokyoshi 2)	One-shot	Sabu	—
1991	Dedicated to Mr. Eikichi Adachi	芦立頌 (Adachi-Sho)	One-shot	Sabu	—
1991	The Mountain Cottage Training Camp	SM同好会～山荘合宿 (Sanso-Gassyuku)	One-shot	Sabu	The Prisoners
1991	The Yoke of Shadow	陰の軛 (Kage-no-Kubiki)	Serialization	Sabu	The Prisoners
1991	The Construction Workers	The Dokata	One-shot	Sabu	The Judo Master
1991	The Legend of Shiramine	白峯異聞 (Shiramine-Ibun)	One-shot	Sabu	The Prisoners
1991	Purgatory	プルガトリオ (Purgatorio)	One-shot	Sabu	The Judo Master
1992	The Legend of Hitotsuya	一つ家異聞 (Hitotsuya-Ibun)	Serialization	Sabu	—
1992	The Toyed Man	嬲り者 (Naburi-Mono)	Serialization	Sabu	The Toyed Man
1992	My Teacher	俺の先生 (Ore-no-Sensei)	Serialization	Sabu	The Judo Master
1992	The Legend of Koromogawa	衣川異聞 (Koromogawa-Ibun)	One-shot	Sabu	Forbidden Works
1994	The Silver Flower	男女郎苦界草紙～銀の華 (Shirogane-no-Hana)	Serialization	Badi	The Silver Flower vols. 1–3
1994	The Echoes	谺 (Kodama)	Serialization	Sabu	The Prisoners
1994	The Judo Master Remix Version	谺 (Kodama)	One-shot	—	The Judo Master
1995	The Prisoners	獲物 (Emono)	Serialization	G-men	—
1995	The Gamefowl in Darkness	闇の中の軍鶏 (Yami-no-Naka-no-Syamo)	Serialization	G-men	Pride vol. 3
1996	The Silent Shore	沈黙の渚 (Chinmoku-no-Nagisa)	Serialization	G-men	The Prisoners
1996	Pride	PRIDE	Serialization	G-men	Pride vols. 1–3
1998	The After Story of The Mountain Cottage Training Camp	山荘合宿後日譚 (Sanso-Gassyuku-Gojitsutan)	One-shot	—	The Prisoners
1999	The Secret Affair of the 43rd Floor	43階の情事 (43kai-no-Joji)	Serialization	Badi	Country Doctor / Pochi
1999	The Soldier's Brave Blood	猛き血潮～大日本帝國陸軍中尉、中里和馬の場合 (Take-ki-Chishio)	One-shot	SM-Z	Forbidden Works
2000	The House of Brutes	外道の家 (Gedo-no-Ie)	Serialization	Badi	The House of Brutes vols. 1–3
2000	The Yakuza's Brave Blood	猛き血潮～釧路大谷組小頭・坂田彦造の場合 (Take-ki-Chishio)	One-shot	SM-Z	Forbidden Works
2000	The Melon Thief	瓜盗人 (Uri-Nusutto)	One-shot	SM-Z	Forbidden Works
2000	The Arena	闘技場～アリーナ	Serialization	G-men	Forbidden Works
2000	Zenith	ZENITH	One-shot	SM-Z	Forbidden Works
2000	The Masochist	「マゾ」 (Mazo)	Serialization	G-men	Flesh + Beard
2001	Nightmare	NIGHTMARE	One-shot	SM-Z	Forbidden Works
2001	Do You Remember the South Island's POW Camp?	君よ知るや南の獄 (Kimi-yo-Shiru-ya-Minami-no-Goku)	Serialization	G-men	Do You Remember the South Island's POW Camp? vols. 1 & 2
2002	Kranke	Kranke	One-shot	SM-Z	Forbidden Works
2002	Gunji	軍次	One-shot	Kinniku-Otoko	Gunji / The Demon Who Lives in the Tower Keep
2003	Trap	TRAP	One-shot	SM-Z	Pride vol. 1
2003	The Scar (Gunji 2)	傷痕 (Kizuato)	One-shot	Kinniku-Otoko	Gunji / The Demon Who Lives in the Tower Keep
2003	The Rain Shower (Gunji 3)	驟雨 (Syuuu)	One-shot	Kinniku-Otoko	Gunji / The Demon Who Lives in the Tower Keep
2003	The Pit of Fire 1 (Gunji 4)	火坑 1 (Kakou 1)	One-shot	Kinniku-Otoko	Gunji / The Demon Who Lives in the Tower Keep
2003	The Sow's Heaven	メス豚の天国 (Mesubuta-no-Tengoku)	One-shot	SoMe Bizzarre	Gunji / The Demon Who Lives in the Tower Keep
2003	Trap 2	TRAP 2	One-shot	SM-Z	Pride vol. 2
2003	The Pit of Fire 2 (Gunji 5)	火坑 2 (Kakou 2)	One-shot	Kinniku-Otoko	Gunji / The Demon Who Lives in the Tower Keep
2004	The Demon Who Lives in the Tower Keep	天守に棲む鬼 (Tensyu-ni-Sumu-Oni)	One-shot	Kinniku-Otoko	Gunji / The Demon Who Lives in the Tower Keep
2004	The Hairy Oracle	Hairy Oracle	One-shot	Kinniku-Otoko	Gunji / The Demon Who Lives in the Tower Keep
2004	The Unpatriotic Boy	非國民 (Hikokumin)	One-shot	SM-Z	Pride vol. 3
2004	The Flower Garden of Bondage	嗜虐の花園 (Shigyaku-no-Hanazono)	One-shot	Reijin Dramatic	—
2004	I Wanted to Say "I Love You" for the Whole	ずっと好きだと言えなくて (Zutto-Sukida-to-Ienakute)	One-shot	Kinniku-Otoko	Gunji / The Demon Who Lives in the Tower Keep
2004	The Tumble Doll MP	だるま憲兵 (Daruma-Kenpei)	One-shot	Super SM-Z	Forbidden Works
2004	The Ballad of Oeyama	大江山綺譚 (Oeyama-Kitan)	One-shot	Kinniku-Otoko	Gunji / The Demon Who Lives in the Tower Keep
2005	Virtus	雄心～ウィルトゥース (Yushin~virtus)	Serialization	Gekidan	Virtus
2005	I Can't Tell Anybody	誰にも言えない (Darenimo-Ienai)	One-shot	Super SM-Z	Virtus
2007	The Translucent Golden Eyes	透き通るような黄金（きん）の瞳 (Sukitooru-youna-Kin-no-Hitomi)	One-shot	Hontou-ni-Kowai-Douwa	—
2007	The Vast Snow Field	雪原渺々 (Setsugen-Byo-Byo)	One-shot	Nikutai-Ha	Virtus
2007	The Nonulcer Dyspepsia	神経性胃炎 (Shinkeisei-Ien)	One-shot	Nikutai-Ha	Virtus
2007	Piko's Inside	ぴこのなかみ (Piko-no-Nakami)	One-shot	Oshiri-Club	—
2007	The Sunset: Xi Taihou and Dong Taihou	落日～西太后と東太后 (Rakujitsu~Seitaigou-to-Totaigou)	One-shot	Hontou-ni-Kowai-Douwa	—
2007	The Long Lonely Night	長夜寞々 (Choya-Baku-Baku)	One-shot	Nikutai-Ha	Flesh + Beard
2007	The Army of Fallen-Tears	哀酷義勇軍 (Aikoku-Giyuugun)	One-shot	Nikutai-Ha	Boy in Hell / Father and Son in Hell
2008	The Protege	稚児 (Chigo)	One-shot	Nikutai-Ha	Flesh + Beard
2008	The Puppet Master	傀儡廻（くぐつまわし） (Kugutsu-mawashi)	One-shot	Badi	Country Doctor / Pochi
2008	The Gigolo	ジゴロ (Jigoro)	One-shot	Badi	Country Doctor / Pochi
2008	The Confession	告白 (Kokuhaku)	Serialization	Badi	Boy in Hell / Father and Son in Hell
2008	The Pillory	晒し台 (Sarashidai)	One-shot	Nikutai-Ha	Flesh + Beard
2008	A Boy In Hell	童（わっぱ）地獄 (Wappa-Jigoku)	Serialization	Nikutai-Ha	Boy in Hell / Father and Son in Hell
2008	Run, My Horse, Run!	汗馬疾々（かんばとうとう） (Kanba-Tou-Tou)	One-shot	Nikutai-Ha	Flesh + Beard
2008	Pochi, My Dog	ポチ (Pochi)	Serialization	Badi	Country Doctor / Pochi
2008	Dissolve	DISSOLVE～ディゾルブ～ (Dhizorubu)	One-shot	Nikutai-Ha	Flesh + Beard
2009	Father and Son in Hell	父子（おやこ）地獄 (Oyako-Jigoku)	Serialization	Badi	Boy in Hell / Father and Son in Hell
2009	Moon Shower	雨降りお月さん (Amefuri-Otsukisan)	One-shot	Nikutai-Ha	Flesh + Beard
2009	Butchering My Son	倅解体 (Segare-Kaitai)	One-shot	Manga Kono Mystery ga Omoshiroi!	—
2009	The Eclosion	ECLOSION	One-shot	Nikutai-Ha	Flesh + Beard
2009	The Flying Dutchman	Der Fliegende Hollander	One-shot	Badi	Boy in Hell / Father and Son in Hell
2009	Manimal Chronicles	人畜無骸 (Jinchiku Mugai)	Serialization	Badi	—
2009	Hot Oden	おでんぐつぐつ (Oden Gutu-Gutsu)	One-shot	Nikutai-Ha	Muscle Octameron
2009	The Lover Boy	Lover Boy	Serialization	Badi	Country Doctor / Pochi
2009	The Exorcism	鬼祓え (Oden Gutu-Gutsu)	One-shot	Nikutai-Ha	Muscle Octameron
2010	Standing Ovations	スタンディング・オベーション (Sutandhingu-obeisyon)	One-shot	Badi	Country Doctor / Pochi
2010	What Is This Thing Called Love?	恋とは何でしょう (Koi Towa Nandesyou)	One-shot	Nikutai-ha	Tsutsui Manga Tokuhon Futatabi
2010	The Job Switch	転職 (Tensyoku)	One-shot	Nikutai-ha	Muscle Octameron
2010	The Country Doctor	田舎医者 (Inaka Isya)	Serialization	Badi	Country Doctor / Pochi
2010	Company Slave Elegy	社畜哀歌 (Syachiku-Aika)	One-shot	Badi	Muscle Octameron
2010	In the Chest	長持の中 (Nagamochi no naka)	Serialization	Badi	Winter Fisherman's Lodge / In The Chest
2010	The Cretian Cow	クレタの牝牛 (Kureta no Meushi)	One-shot	Nikutai-ha	Muscle Octameron
2010	Missing	MISSING ～ミッシング～ (Missingu)	One-shot	Nikutai-ha	Muscle Octameron
2011	The Winter Fisherman Lodge	冬の番家 (Fuyu no Ban-ya)	Serialization	Badi	Winter Fisherman's Lodge / In The Chest
2011	Man-Cunt	ACTINIA	Serialization	Badi	Winter Fisherman's Lodge / In The Chest
2011	Monster Hunt Show	モンスター・ハント・ショー	One-shot	Nikutai-ha Gachi!	Muscle Octameron
2012	Endless Game	エンドレス・ゲーム (Endoresu Gemu)	Serialization	Badi	Endless Game
2012	End Line	END LINE	One-shot	Nikutai-ha Gachi!	Muscle Octameron
2012	My Favorite Things	お気に入り☆萌えブーム (Okini-iri Moe-boom)	One-shot	Karen	—
2013	Contracts of the Fall	転落の契約 (Tenraku no Keiyaku)	Serialization	Badi	Endless Game
2013	Thin Earlobe	転落の契約 (Fufukumimi)	One-shot	Hontou-ni-Kowai-Douwa	—
2013	Slave Training Summer Camp	奴隷調教合宿 (Dorei Chôkyô Gassyuku)	Serialization	Badi	Slave Training Summer Camp
2014	My Brother's Husband	弟の夫 (Otouto no Otto)	Serialization	Monthly Action	My Brother's Husband vols. 1–4
2015	On All Four on Friday Nights	金曜の夜は四つん這いで (Kinyo no Yoru ha Yotsunbai De)	Serialization	Badi	Slave Training Summer Camp
2015	Planet Brobdingnag	プラネット・ブロブディンナグ (Puranetto Burobudin-nagu)	Serialization	Badi	—
2016	Khoz, The Spellbound Slave	呪縛の性奴 (Jubaku no Seido)	Serialization	Self-published	Khoz, The Spellbound Slave
2017	Meat Carrot	肉人参 (Niku Ninjin)	Serialization	Badi	—
2017	Grandpa's Meat Carrot	じっちゃんの肉人参 (Jicchan no Niku Ninjin)	Serialization	Badi	—
2018	King of the Sun	日輪の王 (Nichirin no Oh)	Serialization	Badi	—
2018	Our Colors	僕らの色彩 (Bokura no Shikisai)	Serialization	Monthly Action	Our Colors vols. 1–3
2018	Bitch of the Jungle	Bitch of the Jungle	Serialization	Self-published	Bitch of the Jungle
2018	My Summer Holidays	俺の夏休み (Ore no Natsu Yasumi)	One-shot	Badi	—
2018	I Became A Bitch Of My Best Friend's Dad	親友の親父に雌にされて (Dachi no Oyaji ni Mesu ni Sarete)	Serialization	Badi	—
2019	Khoz 2: A Report on a Slave Training Under a Spell	呪縛の性奴：呪的口肛調教録 (Jubaku no Seido: Juteki Koukou Choukyou Roku)	One-shot	Self-published	—
2019	False Detective – Resurgence: Fancy Homosexual Boy	新・刑事もどき ゲイボーイ (Shin Deka Modoki: Gei boi)	One-shot	Tezucomi	—
2022	Fish and Water	魚と水 (Uo to Mizu)	Serialization	Web Action	—

Collected editions
- The Toyed Man (嬲り者, Naburi-Mono), 1994, B Product; (Note: Tagame's early books published through B Product and G-Project were sold as direct sales to gay stores in Japan, and thus lack ISBN codes.) republished October 12, 2017, Pot Publishing (ISBN 978-4866420066)
- The Silver Flower (男女郎苦界草紙～銀の華, Shirogane-no-Hana), 2001, G-Project; republished by Pot Publishing as:
  - The Silver Flower vol. 1 (October 27, 2012, ISBN 978-4780801866)
  - The Silver Flower vol. 2 (October 27, 2012, ISBN 978-4780801873)
  - The Silver Flower vol. 3 (October 27, 2012, ISBN 978-4780801880)
- Pride, published by Furukawa Shobo as:
  - Pride vol. 1 (October 2004, ISBN 978-4892363061); also includes Trap (2003)
  - Pride vol. 2 (November 2004, ISBN 978-4892363108); also includes Trap 2 (2003)
  - Pride vol. 3 (December 2004, ISBN 978-4892363146); also includes The Gamefowl in Darkness (1995) and The Unpatriotic Boy (2004)
- The House of Brutes (外道の家, Gedo-no-Ie), published by Terra Publications as:
  - The House of Brutes vol. 1 (November 30, 2006, JAN 491007486188)
  - The House of Brutes vol. 2 (January 31, 2007, JAN 491007480386)
  - The House of Brutes vol. 3 (March 31, 2007, JAN 4910074860584)
- Do You Remember the South Island's POW Camp? (君よ知るや南の獄, Kimi-yo-Shiru-ya-Minami-no-Goku), published by Pot Publishing as:
  - Do You Remember the South Island's POW Camp? vol. 1 (December 25, 2007, ISBN 978-4780801095)
  - Do You Remember the South Island's POW Camp? vol. 2 (December 25, 2007, ISBN 978-4780801101)
- My Brother's Husband (弟の夫, Otōto no Otto), published by Futabasha as:
  - My Brother's Husband vol. 1 (May 25, 2015, ISBN 978-4575846256)
  - My Brother's Husband vol. 2 (January 1, 2016, ISBN 978-4575847413)
  - My Brother's Husband vol. 3 (October 12, 2016, ISBN 978-4575848632)
  - My Brother's Husband vol. 4 (July 12, 2017, ISBN 978-4575850055)
- Our Colors (僕らの色彩, Bokura no Shikisai), published by Futabasha as:
  - Our Colors vol. 1 (January 12, 2019, ISBN 978-4575852554)
  - Our Colors vol. 2 (October 11, 2019, ISBN 978-4575853605)
  - Our Colors vol. 3 (September 12, 2020, ISBN 978-4575854909)
- Fish and Water (魚と水, Uo to Mizu), Futabasha (May 18, 2023, ISBN 978-4575858433)
Anthologies
- The Judo Master (柔術教師, Jujutsu-Kyoshi), 1994, B Product; republished 2020 by Pot Publishing (ISBN 978-4866420127)
  - Collects The Rasp (1990), The Construction Workers (1991), Purgatory (1991), The Legend of Hitotsuya (1992), My Teacher (1992), and The Judo Master Remix Version (1994)
- The Prisoners (獲物, Emono), 1998, G-Project
  - Collects The Mountain Cottage Training Camp (1991), The Yoke of Shadow (1991), The Legend of Shiramine (1991), The Echoes (1994), The Prisoners (1995), The Silent Shore (1996), and The After Story of The Mountain Cottage Training Camp (1998)
- Gunji / The Demon Who Lives in the Tower Keep (軍次/ 天守に棲む鬼, Gunji / Tensyu-ni-Sumu-Oni), 2005, Furukawa Shobo (ISBN 978-4892363368)
  - Collects the Gunji tetralogy [Gunji (2002), The Scar (2003), The Rain Shower (2003), and The Pit of Fire [2003)] and The Ballad of Ôeyama (2004)], The Sow's Heaven (2003), The Demon Who Lives in the Tower Keep (2004), The Hairy Oracle (2004), I Wanted to Say "I Love You" for the Whole (2004), and The Ballad of Oeyama (2004)
- Forbidden Works (禁断 作品集, Kindan Sakuhinsyu), 2007, Pot Publishing (ISBN 978-4-7808-0101-9)
  - Collects The Legend of Koromogawa (1992), The Soldier's Brave Blood (1999), The Yakuza's Brave Blood (2000), The Melon Thief (2000), The Arena (2000), Zenith (2000), Nightmare (2001), Kranke (2002), and The Tumble Doll MP (2004)
- Virtus (ウィルトゥース), October 12, 2007, Oakla Publishing (ISBN 978-4775510582)
  - Collects Virtus (2005), I Can't Tell Anybody (2005), The Vast Snow Field (2007), and The Nonulcer Dyspepsia (2007)
- Flesh + Beard (髭と肉体), 2009, Ôkura Publishing (ISBN 978-4775514276)
  - Collects The Masochist (2000), The Long Lonely Night (2007), The Nonulcer Dyspepsia (2007), Dissolve (2008) The Pillory (2008) The Protege (2008), Run, My Horse, Run! (2008), The Eclosion (2009), and The Moon Over the Rainy Sky (2009)
- Boy in Hell / Father and Son in Hell (童地獄・父子地獄, Wappa Jigoku - Oyako Jigoku), 2010, Pot Publishing (ISBN 978-4780801569)
  - Collects The Army of Fallen-Tears (2007), A Boy In Hell (2008), The Confession (2008) Father and Son in Hell (2009), and The Flying Dutchman (2009)
- Country Doctor / Pochi (田舎医者／ポチ, Inaka Isya / Pochi), 2012, Pot Publishing (ISBN 978-4780801781)
  - Collects The Secret Affair of the 43rd Floor (1999), The Puppet Master (2008), The Gigolo (2008), Pochi, My Dog (2008), The Lover Boy (2009), Standing Ovations (2010), The Country Doctor (2010), and Enslaved in Unknown World (2012)
- Muscle Octameron (筋肉綺譚), 2012, OKS Publishing (ISBN 978-4799003466)
  - Collects The Exorcism (2009), Hot Oden (2009), Company Slave Elegy (2010), Cretian Cow (2010), The Job Switch (2010), Missing (2010), Monster Hunt Show (2011), End Line (2012)
- Winter Fisherman’s Lodge / In The Chest (冬の番屋／長持の中, Fuyu no Ban-ya / Nagamochi no Naka), 2013, Pot Publishing (ISBN 978-4780802009)
  - Collects In the Chest (2010), The Winter Fisherman Lodge (2011), and Man-Cunt (2011)
- Endless Game (エンドレス・ゲーム), 2014, Pot Publishing (ISBN 978-4780802078)
  - Collects Endless Game (2012) and Contracts of the Fall (2013)
- Slave Training Summer Camp (奴隷調教合宿, Dorei Chôkyô Gassyuku), 2017, Pot Publishing (ISBN 978-4866420042)
  - Collects Slave Training Summer Camp (2013) and On All Four on Friday Nights (2015)
- Meat Carrot / Manimal Chronicles (肉人参／人畜無骸), 2021, Pot Publishing Plus (ISBN 978-4866420189)
  - Collects Manimal Chronicles (2009), Planet Brobdingnag (2015), Meat Carrot (2017), and Grandpa’s Meat Carrot (2017),
English-translated collected editions & anthologies
- The Passion of Gengoroh Tagame (2013, Picturebox, ISBN 978-0984589241)
  - Collects The Arena (2000), The Hairy Oracle (2004), The Exorcism (2009), The Country Doctor (2010), Missing (2010), Standing Ovations (2010), and Class Act (2013)
- Massive: Gay Erotic Manga and the Men Who Make It (2014, Fantagraphics Books, ISBN 978-1606997857)
  - Multi-author anthology containing an excerpt of Do You Remember the South Island's POW Camp? (2001)
- Endless Game (2013, Bruno Gmünder, ISBN 978-3867876414)
  - Collects Endless Game (2012)
- Gunji (2014, Bruno Gmünder, ISBN 978-3867876759)
  - Collects the Gunji tetralogy [Gunji (2002), The Scar (2003), The Rain Shower (2003), and The Pit of Fire [2003)] and The Ballad of Ôeyama (2004)
- Fisherman’s Lodge (2014, Bruno Gmünder, ISBN 978-3867877954)
  - Collects The Confession (2008), The Winter Fisherman Lodge (2011), and End Line (2012)
- The Contracts of the Fall (2015, Bruno Gmünder, ISBN 978-3959850100)
  - Collects Pochi, My Dog (2008), The Flying Dutchman (2009), The Lover Boy (2009), and The Contracts of the Fall (2013)
- Khoz, The Spellbound Slave (2018, Bear’s Cave)
  - Collects Khoz, The Spellbound Slave (2016, eBook)
- My Brother's Husband (Pantheon), published as:
  - My Brother's Husband vol. 1 (2017, ISBN 978-1101871515)
  - My Brother's Husband vol. 2 (2018, ISBN 978-1101871539)
  - My Brother's Husband omnibus (2020, ISBN 978-0375715181)
- Our Colors (2022, Pantheon, ISBN 978-1524748562)
- The Passion of Gengoroh Tagame, Vol. 2 (2022, Fantagraphics, ISBN 978-1683965282)
  - Collects Dissolve (2008), Manimal Chronicles (2009), Moon Shower (2009), Slave Training Summer Camp (2013), and King of the Sun (2018)

=== Art books and novels ===
- Gay Erotic Art in Japan Vol. 1: Artists From the Time of the Birth of Gay Magazines (2003, Pot Publishing, ISBN 978-4939015588)
- Gay Erotic Art in Japan Vol. 2: Transitions of Gay Fantasy in the Times (2006, Pot Publishing, ISBN 978-4939015922)
- To the Future of Gay Culture (2017, P-Vine, ISBN 978-4907276867)
- Gay Erotic Art in Japan Vol. 3: Growth of the Gay Magazines and the Diversification of their Artists (2018, Pot Publishing, ISBN 978-4780802337)
- Gengoroh Tagame Sketchbook (2018, Massive Goods)

== Reception and influence ==
Tagame is regarded as the most prolific and influential creator of gay manga. The manga anthology Massive: Gay Erotic Manga and the Men Who Make It notes Tagame as "without a doubt the individual most directly responsible for the success of gay manga," while Kidd has compared his oeuvre to that of the Marquis de Sade, Pier Paolo Pasolini, and Yukio Mishima.

Anthropologist Wim Lunsing credits the "bear-type" aesthetic pioneered by Tagame with provoking a major stylistic shift in Shinjuku Ni-chōme, the gay neighborhood of Tokyo. Following the publication of G-men, the "slender and slick" clean-shaven style popular among gay men was replaced with "stubble, beards and moustaches [...] extremely short became the most common hair style and the broad muscular body, soon to evolve to chubby and outright fat, became highly fashionable." Tagame's work in establishing G-men is further credited as providing an incubator for up-and-coming talent in the gay manga genre, and launching the careers of artists such as Jiraiya. His archival efforts in producing Gay Erotic Art in Japan are further credited with developing a "gay art canon" of Japanese erotic art. Among Tagame's critics are gay erotic artist Susumu Hirosegawa, who has described his art as "S&M theater" and criticized his manga as "simple emanations of the SM-shumiō [hobby] of Tagame." Lunsing concurs that "it is hard to counter [Hirosegawa's] argument, as [Tagame's] stories are not very elaborate."

Tagame has won multiple awards for his work, primarily My Brother's Husband. The series was awarded excellence awards at the 19th Japan Media Arts Festival in 2015 and the Japan Cartoonists Association Award in 2018. Internationally, the series won an Eisner Award for Best U.S. Edition of International Material—Asia in 2018. Works by Tagame were exhibited at the British Museum in 2019 as part of The Citi Exhibition: Manga, its exhibition on the history of manga.
