= G-men (magazine) =

Japanese gay lifestyle brand and magazine

G-men ジーメン
- The cover of the first issue; art by Gengoroh Tagame.
- Categories: Gay lifestyle
- Frequency: Monthly
- Publisher: Furukawa Shobu
- Founded: April 1995
- Final issue: February 2016
- Country: Japan
- Language: Japanese
- Website: G-Men Official Site; G-men at Furukawa Shobu

G-men (ジーメン, Jīmen) is a Japanese gay lifestyle brand, and formerly a monthly magazine.

== History ==
Gay magazines in Japan, along with much gay culture, are segregated by 'type' (e.g., muscular men, older men, specific occupations); G-men was founded in 1995 to cater to gay men who preferred "macho fantasy", as opposed to the sleeker, yaoi-inspired styles popular in the 1980s, and focused on "macho type" (muscular, bearish men) and gaten-kei (ガテン系, blue-collar workers).

G-men included both editorial and photographic material, as well as prose stories and manga. G-men was designed to encourage steady readership by presenting a more well-defined fantasy image, and by running serialized, continuing manga stories (as opposed to the one-shot stories standard in other gay men's magazines) which encouraged purchase of every issue. Gengoroh Tagame's work was an important influence on G-men's style; he provided the cover for the first 63 issues, as well as manga stories for most issues. G-men was also one of the first gay men's publishers to offer collections of manga bound into tankōbon. The manga published in G-men, particularly Tagame's work, was influential in the development of manga for gay men as a marketable category.

Issues of G-men usually had approximately 300–500 pages, including several pages of glossy colour and some black and white photographs and drawings of hairy, sometimes bearded, muscular men in their 20s and 30s (these photographs are censored in accordance with Japan's rules; while they feature explicit depictions of sex, genitals—and most pubic hair—are obscured). The photographs sometimes featured traditional themes, such as fundoshi, traditional Japanese loincloths. Despite the inclusion of pornographic pictures and stories, however, G-men is not considered a pornographic magazine.

G-men had fewer general articles than other magazines such as Barazoku and more short fiction and serialized stories. Issues included community listings, several different stories—often pornographic—and several in comic form as well, classified ads, and advertisements from gay-related and gay-friendly businesses such as spas, clubs and hotels, bars, cafés and restaurants, host bars (hustler bars), and brothels.

In February 2016, publisher Furukawa Shobu announced that it would cease publication of G-men as a print magazine, though it continues to produce DVDs, books, and gay manga under the G-men brand.
