= List of BDSM artists =

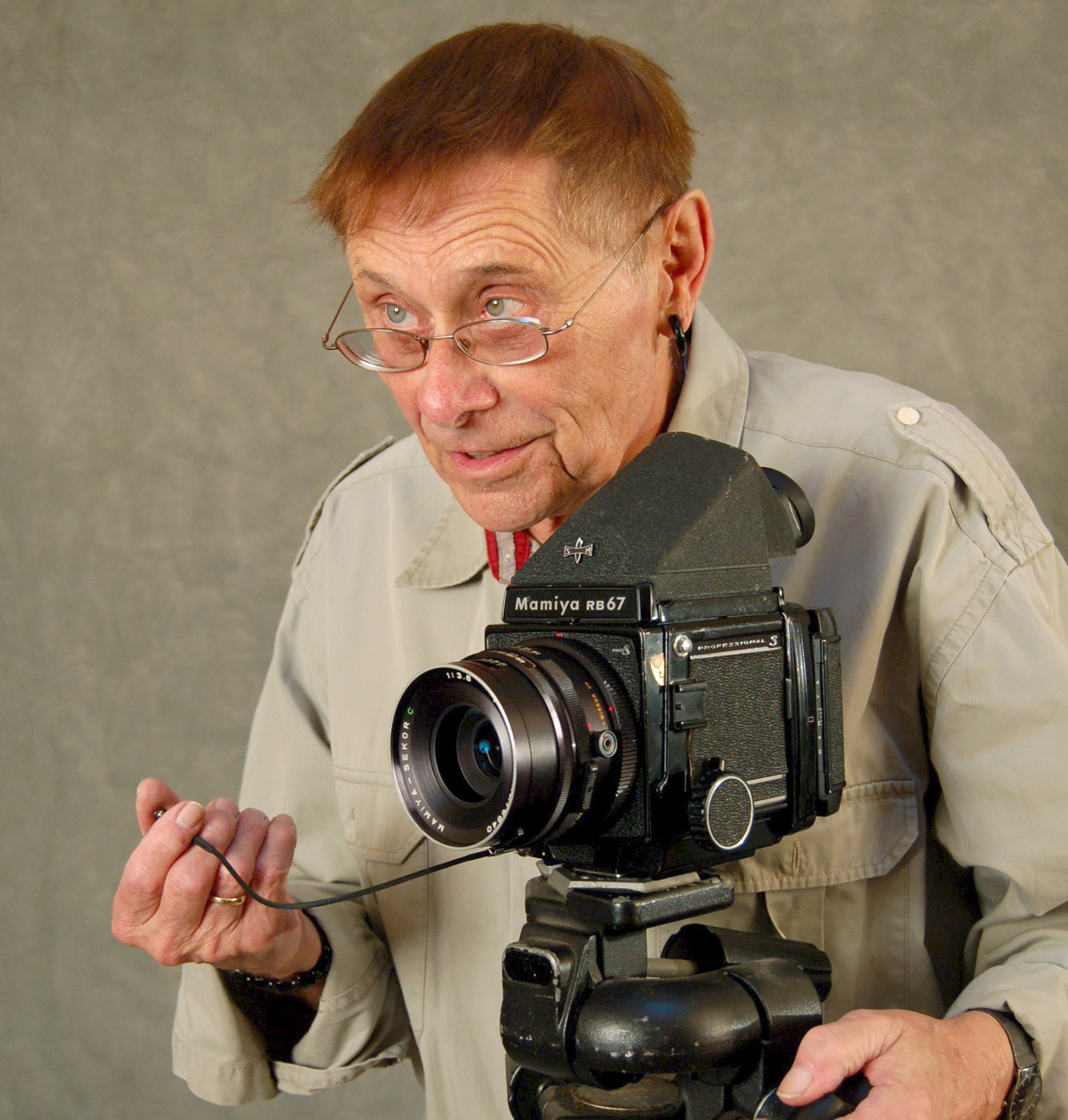
Fakir Musafar; he did BDSM photography.

This is a list of notable artists in the field of BDSM art:

- Peter Acworth
- Nobuyoshi Araki
- Gene Bilbrew
- Robert Bishop
- Jeff Gord
- Erich von Götha de la Rosière
- Charles Guyette
- Namio Harukawa
- Sadao Hasegawa
- Seiu Ito
- Eric Kroll
- Monica Majoli
- Michael Manning
- Robert Mapplethorpe
- Ken Marcus
- Daido Moriyama
- Fakir Musafar
- Helmut Newton
- Barbara Nitke
- Satine Phoenix
- Rex
- Sardax
- Franco Saudelli
- Bill Schmeling
- Brent Scott
- Stjepan Sejic
- Joe Shuster
- Eric Stanton
- Roy Stuart
- Bill Ward
- John Willie
- Sofia Zuluaga

See also: List of BDSM photographers

== See also ==
- List of fetish artists
