= Sanshi Funayama =

Japanese homoerotic fetish artist

- Born: 1920s (estimated); Kansai Region, Japan
- Died: 1999 (estimated)
- Known for: Erotic illustration

Sanshi Funayama (船山三四, Funayama Sanshi; c. 1920s – c. 1999) was a Japanese homoerotic fetish artist. Funayama, along with Go Mishima, Tatsuji Okawa, and Go Hirano, is regarded by artist and historian Gengoroh Tagame as a central figure in the first wave of contemporary gay artists in Japan.

== Biography ==
Funayama's artwork first appeared in the early 1960s in Fuzokukitan, a fetish magazine that published gay content alongside straight and lesbian content. He later contributed to Bara, a private circulation gay magazine, and Barazoku, the first commercially published gay magazine in Japan.

From the 1970s until the late 1990s, Funayama disappeared from public life, and did not publish or circulate art for over three decades. In 1999, he resurfaced to submit two illustrations to the magazine G-men, with a promise to submit additional works. No further works were submitted by Funayama which, combined with his presumed advanced age, led his contemporaries to assume he had died.

Little is known about Funayama's private life. Married with a daughter, Funayama worked as a police officer; he drew while on night shift, and kept his illustrations in his work locker. He was an acquaintance of the writer Yukio Mishima, who would visit Funayama while in Kansai.

== Style and impact ==
Funayama is noted for his depictions of "macho-type" men, often in extreme scenarios involving BDSM, torture, and graphic violence. Police officers appear frequently in his work.

Funayama is a favorite artist of Gengoroh Tagame, who has praised Funayama's works as "one of the peaks in gay erotic art."

== See also ==
- Homosexuality in Japan
