= Go Hirano =

Japanese artist

- Known for: Erotic illustration

Go Hirano (平野剛) was a Japanese homoerotic fetish artist. Hirano, along with Go Mishima, Sanshi Funayama, and Tatsuji Okawa, is regarded by artist and historian Gengoroh Tagame as a central figure in the first wave of contemporary gay artists in Japan.

== Biography ==
Very little information is known about Hirano, as his works were submitted to his editors anonymously. His illustrations are noted for their realist art style, and often featured masculine men with body hair.

In the 1960s, Hirano was published in Fuzokukitan, a fetish magazine that published gay content alongside straight and lesbian content. His art appeared in Barazoku, the first commercially circulated gay magazine in Japan, from the 1970s through the 1990s.

== See also ==
- Homosexuality in Japan
