= Tatsuji Okawa =

Japanese artist

- Born: 1904
- Died: 1994 (aged 89–90)
- Known for: Erotic illustration

Tatsuji Okawa (大川辰次, Tatsuji Okawa; 1904–1994) was a Japanese homoerotic fetish artist. Tatsuji, along with Go Mishima, Sanshi Funayama, and Go Hirano, is regarded by artist and historian Gengoroh Tagame as a central figure in the first wave of contemporary gay artists in Japan.

== Biography ==
Okawa lived in the Kanto region, where in his private life he had a wife, children, and white-collar job, and would rent hotel rooms in Shinjuku to draw. Okawa was nearly 60 years old when his career as an erotic artist began in earnest, when he was published in a 1964 issue of Fuzokukitan, a fetish magazine that published gay content alongside straight and lesbian content. He would later be published in the magazine Barazoku.

Okawa quit illustration in the 1970s, and gave his artist materials to Mamiya Hiroshi, an editor at Fuzokukitan. Upon his death in 1994, his works were acquired by Hiroshi and Bungaku Itō, the founding editor of Barazoku.

The writer Yukio Mishima was a fan of Okawa's, and reportedly commissioned Okawa to draw a portrait of Mishima being tortured.

== See also ==
- Homosexuality in Japan
