= Go Mishima =

Japanese artist

- Born: Tsuyoshi Yoshida; 1924; Yokosuka, Japan
- Died: January 5, 1988 (aged 63–64); Tokyo, Japan
- Known for: Erotic illustration

Tsuyoshi Yoshida (1924 – January 5, 1988), known by the pen name Go Mishima (三島剛, Mishima Go), was a Japanese homoerotic fetish artist and founder of the magazine Sabu. He is noted for his illustrations of "macho-type" men, often with yakuza-inspired irezumi tattoos. Mishima, along with Tatsuji Okawa, Sanshi Funayama, and Go Hirano, is regarded by artist and historian Gengoroh Tagame as a central figure in the first wave of contemporary gay artists in Japan.

== Biography ==
Mishima was born in 1924 in Yokosuka, Kanagawa Prefecture. At 18, he was drafted into the Imperial Japanese Army, where he had his first homosexual experience with his commanding officer. Upon the end of the Second World War in 1945, Mishima relocated to Tokyo, where he immersed himself in the nascent gay nightlife of the city. Many bars and nightclubs during this era were operated by the yakuza; Mishima's fascination with their crew cut hairstyles and irezumi tattoos would figure heavily into his art.

During the late 1950s, Mishima discovered the art of Tom of Finland, who came to influence his own work. In 1955, Mishima met the writer Yukio Mishima at a gym, and formed a friendship on their shared interest in athletics, bodybuilding, and hypermasculine sexuality. The two men drew artistic nudes together as a pastime; Go Mishima began to pursue a career in homoerotic art in earnest with Yukio Mishima's encouragement, and adopted Mishima's last name to use as his pen name in tribute. After Yukio Mishima's death by ritual suicide, Go Mishima began to depict more violent material and themes in his art, including bondage, masochism, and torture.

In 1964, Mishima was published in Fuzokukitan and Bara, two of the first magazines in Japan to publish gay and gay pornographic content. He was an early contributor to Barazoku, which in 1971 became the first commercially circulated gay magazine in Japan. Dissatisfied with the bishōnen art style of Barazoku, Mishima founded Sabu in 1974, which focused on images of masculine men, and was more explicitly pornographic.

On January 5, 1988, Mishima died of complications from cirrhosis. A commemorative issue of Barazoku was published in tribute to Mishima in 1989, in which Sadao Hasegawa referred to him as "a master illustrator of the male physique." The first solo exhibition of Mishima's art was held in 1999, at Gallery Naruyama in Tokyo.

== See also ==
- Homosexuality in Japan
