= Schwichtenberg =

Schwichtenberg is a German language surname. Notable people with the name include:

- Ingo Schwichtenberg (1965–1995), German drummer and one of the founding members of the power metal band Helloween
- Helmut Schwichtenberg (born 1942), German mathematical logician
- Martel Schwichtenberg (1896–1945), German painter
- Wilbur Schwichtenberg (1912–1989), American trombonist and bandleader during the 1930s
