= Kuso Miso Technique =

1987 manga by Junichi Yamakawa

- Title page of Kuso Miso Technique, featuring Takakazu Abe (left) and Masaki Michishita (right)

くそみそテクニック
- Genre: Gay manga, comedy
- Manga
- Written by: Junichi Yamakawa
- Published by: Daini Shobō
- Magazine: Bara-Komi
- Published: 1987
- Original video animation
- Directed by: Maki Itō
- Studio: Anime Tokyo; Studio Kingyoiro
- Released: April 1, 2024

Kuso Miso Technique (Japanese: くそみそテクニック) (Note: "Kuso" (くそ) means "crap", though the word is often used simply as interjection, while miso refers to the Japanese seasoning paste. Kuso miso is an idiomatic expression describing an inability to distinguish between something of value and something of no value, referencing the similar visual appearance of brown miso paste and feces.) is a Japanese gay manga one-shot written and illustrated by Junichi Yamakawa. It was originally published in 1987 in Bara-Komi, a manga supplement of the gay men's magazine Barazoku. The manga depicts a sexual encounter between two men in a public restroom that is complicated by the need of one of the men to relieve himself. Published in Bara-Komi to relative obscurity, Kuso Miso Technique gained notoriety as an Internet meme in the early 2000s after scanned copies of the manga were posted on Japanese imageboards and online forums.

== Plot ==
Masaki Michishita, a "typical guy" enrolled in preparatory school, is running to a restroom in a public park when he spots a man wearing a jumpsuit sitting on a nearby bench. The man, Takakazu Abe, unzips his jumpsuit and exposes his penis, asking Masaki, "Why don't we do it?" (やらないか, yaranai ka). They proceed to the restroom to have sexual intercourse.

Abe performs fellatio on Michishita, upon which Michishita informs him that he needs to urinate. Abe asks Michishita to take the dominant position in anal sex and urinate inside of him, which Michishita obliges. The pair switch positions, and Michishita informs Abe that he now needs to defecate. Abe is annoyed, but nevertheless suggests to a horrified Michishita to defecate while he penetrates him. The ending is left ambiguous, with Michishita commenting through narration that the encounter with Abe "turned out to be a shit show" (くそみそな結果に終わってしまった, kuso miso na kekka ni owatte shimatta).

== Characters ==
Masaki Michishita (道下 正樹, Michishita Masaki)
A prep school student with no prior sexual experience with men, though he often fantasizes about them. He is strongly attracted to Takakazu Abe at first sight, prompting him to think, "Whoa! Hot guy!" (ウホッ! いい男…, Uho! Ii otoko...).
Takakazu Abe (阿部 高和, Abe Takakazu)
An auto mechanic. In the story, he sits provocatively on a park bench looking for sex. He is well-endowed and an experienced sexual partner.

== Publication ==
Kuso Miso Technique was originally published in 1987 in Bara-Komi, a manga supplement of the gay men's magazine Barazoku. The series has subsequently been re-published in two anthologies of works by Yamakawa: Uho~tsu!! Ī Otoko-tachi ~ Yamajun Pāfekuto Yamakawa Jun'ichi Komikku (ウホッ！！いい男たち~ヤマジュン・パーフェクト 山川 純一 コミック), published by Fukkan.com in 2003; and Uho~tsu! ! Ī Otoko-tachi 2 Yamajun mi Happyō Sakuhin-shū Yamakawa Jun'ichi (ウホッ!!いい男たち2 ヤマジュン・未発表作品集 山川 純一), published by Booking in 2009.

Copyrights for Yamakawa's works were held by Barazoku editor-in-chief Ito Bungaku, who in 2013 transferred the copyright for Kuso Miso Technique to the production company IKD International. In 2018, the copyrights for all of Yamakawa's works, including Kuso Miso Technique, were transferred to the entertainment company Cyzo.

== Impact ==
Takakazu Abe (left) and Masaki Michishita (right). Their faces in this panel are prominently featured in parodies.

Published to relative obscurity in 1987, Kuso Miso Technique gained notoriety as an Internet meme beginning in 2002 after scanned copies of the manga were posted on the imageboards 2channel and Futaba Channel. The memeification of the series, particularly the posting of images edited to include Abe and Michishita's faces mid-coitus, triggered the so-called "Yamajun boom" that saw significant public interest in Junichi Yamakawa's manga, with several anthologies of Yamakawa's works selling out the entirety of their print runs. Shift_JIS art of the manga produced on 2channel also contributed to the boom.

Lines from the manga such as "uho! Ii otoko", "yaranai ka", and the interjection "uho!" became popular Internet slang on Japanese forums and imageboards, as well as among the Japanese gay community. "Yaranai" was ranked the 16th in 2007's "Net Slang of the Year" in Japan. In 2009, in a survey by Gadget News asking respondents "which manga do you think is the most interesting?", Kuso Miso Technique placed 11th. A variety of official merchandise related to Kuso Miso Technique has been produced, including t-shirts and body pillow covers.

A parody song inspired by the series, "Yaranaika", was created by a 2channel user; the song is composed of homoerotic lyrics set to the melody of "Balalaika" by Koharu Kusumi of Morning Musume. The song became popular on video sites such as Nico Nico Douga, where it has been integrated into one of the site's most popular medleys. Yuichiro Nagashima, a kickboxer famous for cosplaying during matches, once entered the ring dressed in Abe's jumpsuit with the parody song as background music.

== Adaptations ==
Japanese pornography studio Moodyz released a live-action adaptation of Kuso Miso Technique in 2012. Billed as a "pinnacle of futanari anal", the film stars female pornographic actresses Reiko Sawamura and Uta Kohaku as Abe and Michishita, respectively.

On April 1, 2023, it was announced that Anime Tokyo would produce a "medium-length" anime film adaptation of Kuso Miso Technique directed by Maki Itō. Itō, a director at Studio Kingyorio, created a live-action fan video adaptation of Kuso Miso Technique while in junior high school, which by 2023 had over 550,000 views on YouTube. The film will reportedly be developed as an all-ages title, and will expand on the story of the original manga and incorporate elements from Yamakawa's other manga. The adaptation was funded through a crowdfunding campaign commenced in Q3 2023. The film was released on DVD and Blu-Ray April 1, 2024.
