= Confessions of a Mask =

Novel by Yukio Mishima

- First edition (Japanese)
- Author: Yukio Mishima
- Original title: Kamen no Kokuhaku (假面の告白)
- Translator: Meredith Weatherby
- Language: Japanese
- Publisher: Kawade Shobō (Japan); New Directions (US Eng. trans)
- Publication date: 5 July 1949
- Publication place: Japan
- English publication date: 1958
- Media type: Print (hardback & paperback)
- Pages: 254 p.
- ISBN: 0-8112-0118-X
- OCLC: 759934

Confessions of a Mask (仮面の告白, Kamen no Kokuhaku) is the second novel by Japanese author Yukio Mishima. First published on 5 July 1949 by Kawade Shobō, it launched him to national fame though he was only in his early twenties. Some have posited that Mishima's similarities to the main character of the novel come from the character acting as a stand-in for Mishima's own autobiographical story.

The novel is divided into four long chapters, and is written using the first-person narrative mode.

The book's epigraph is a lengthy quote from The Brothers Karamazov by Dostoevsky ("The Penance of a Fervent Heart—Poem" in Part 3, Book 3).

Confessions of a Mask was translated into English by Meredith Weatherby for New Directions in 1958.

== Background and composition ==
After resigning from the Ministry of Finance in September 1948, Mishima planned to begin work on a novel at the request of his publisher, Kawade Shobō, though it took him two months to decide exactly what form it should take. Writing to editor Sakamoto Kazuki, Mishima declared:

"This next novel will be my first I-novel ever; of course, it won't be an I-novel of the Literary Establishment sort, but it will be an attempt to vivisect myself in which I will turn on myself the blade of psychological analysis that I have honed for the hypothetical figure so far. I will aim for as much scientific accuracy as I can; I will try to be Baudelaire's so-called 'victim and executioner.'" (Note: A reference to Baudelaire's poem "The Self-Tormentor" ("L'Héautontimorouménos"), which appears in The Flowers of Evil.)

Mishima would later compare his Confessions to Vita Sexualis by Mori Ōgai and Armance by Stendhal.

=== Autobiographical themes ===
Multiple subjects in the novel reflect Mishima’s real life, making the work semi-autobiographical. Author and friend of Mishima's, Henry Scott-Stokes, writes in The Life and Death of Yukio Mishima that the novel "reveals more of his character and of his upbringing than anything else he wrote: it gives a crystalline account of his aesthetic."

The character of Sonoko Kusano was modeled after a girl named Kuniko Mitani, who was one of Mishima's first crushes. She was the younger sister of Mishima's close friend, Makoto Mitani. Mishima confessed in a letter to an acquaintance, Chikayoshi Ninagawa (editor at Kamakura Bunko and later professor at Waseda University):

If I did not write about this girl, I'm certain I would have died. It does not matter if this statement is unreasonable, the existence of Sonoko has taken over my life.

After Mishima's death, Kuniko was interviewed about her portrayal in Confessions of a Mask. She stated, "Mishima was a very meek and sober person. I think he only disguised himself as a deviant." A similar idea was echoed by author Takeshi Muramatsu, a childhood friend of Mishima's, in his biography about him; regarding this, Henry Scott-Stokes writes:

When Mishima was very young, he had a first love, a girl who rejected him. Mishima was pained by the rebuff (echoes of this unhappy experience are found in Confessions of a Mask in the character of Sonoko). Thereafter, according to Muramatsu, Mishima opted for an ersatz brand of homosexuality—this was the "mask" of Confessions of a Mask. [...] I would interpret Muramatsu's own motivations—I knew him well—in this fashion: One, prudery. Two, respect for the Mishima family. Three, Muramatsu was a conservative intellectual and ranked himself alongside Mishima, as his equal in intellect.

The character Omi, who appears in the novel, was based on a student in Mishima's class who had been held back for 4 to 5 years. The student was known by the nickname Bura (meaning "aimless"). Mishima viewed him as a heroic figure, and found a beauty and sensitivity within his coarse behavior. Another model for the character of Omi included a "fair-skinned and very bright-eyed boy" one grade below Mishima who he was fond of.

At the start of the novel, the narrator discusses remembering his own birth. According to Makoto Mitano, who was in the same class as Mishima attending Gakushūin elementary school, Mishima told another classmate that he had memories of being born, shocking Makoto and another student who overheard.

The friend of the narrator who invites him to a red-light district was based on Seiichi Yashiro, a friend of Mishima's. Yashiro brought Mishima along to the "demimonde" in January 1947. Despite poking fun at Mishima and "playing the bad guy to establish a sense of superiority", Yashiro had never visited a brothel before, and only gave a woman money before leaving. Mishima never knew this, and thought only he was a virgin.

== Plot ==
The protagonist is referred to in the story as Kochan, which is the diminutive of the author's real name: Kimitake (公威). Being raised during Japan's era of right-wing militarism and Imperialism, he struggles from a very early age to fit into society. Like Mishima, Kochan was born with a less-than-ideal body in terms of physical fitness and robustness, and throughout the first half of the book (which generally details Kochan's childhood), he struggles intensely to fit into Japanese society. A weak homosexual, Kochan is kept away from boys his own age as he is raised, and is thus not exposed to the norm. His isolation likely led to his future fascinations and fantasies of death, violence, and same-sex intercourse.

Kochan is homosexual, and in the context of Imperial Japan, he struggles to keep it to himself. In the early portion of the novel, Kochan does not yet openly admit that he is attracted to men, but indeed professes that he admires masculinity and strength while having no interest in women. This includes an admiration for Roman sculptures and statues of men in dynamic physical positions. Some have argued that the admiration of masculinity is autobiographical of Mishima, himself having worked hard through a naturally weak body to become stronger and a male model.

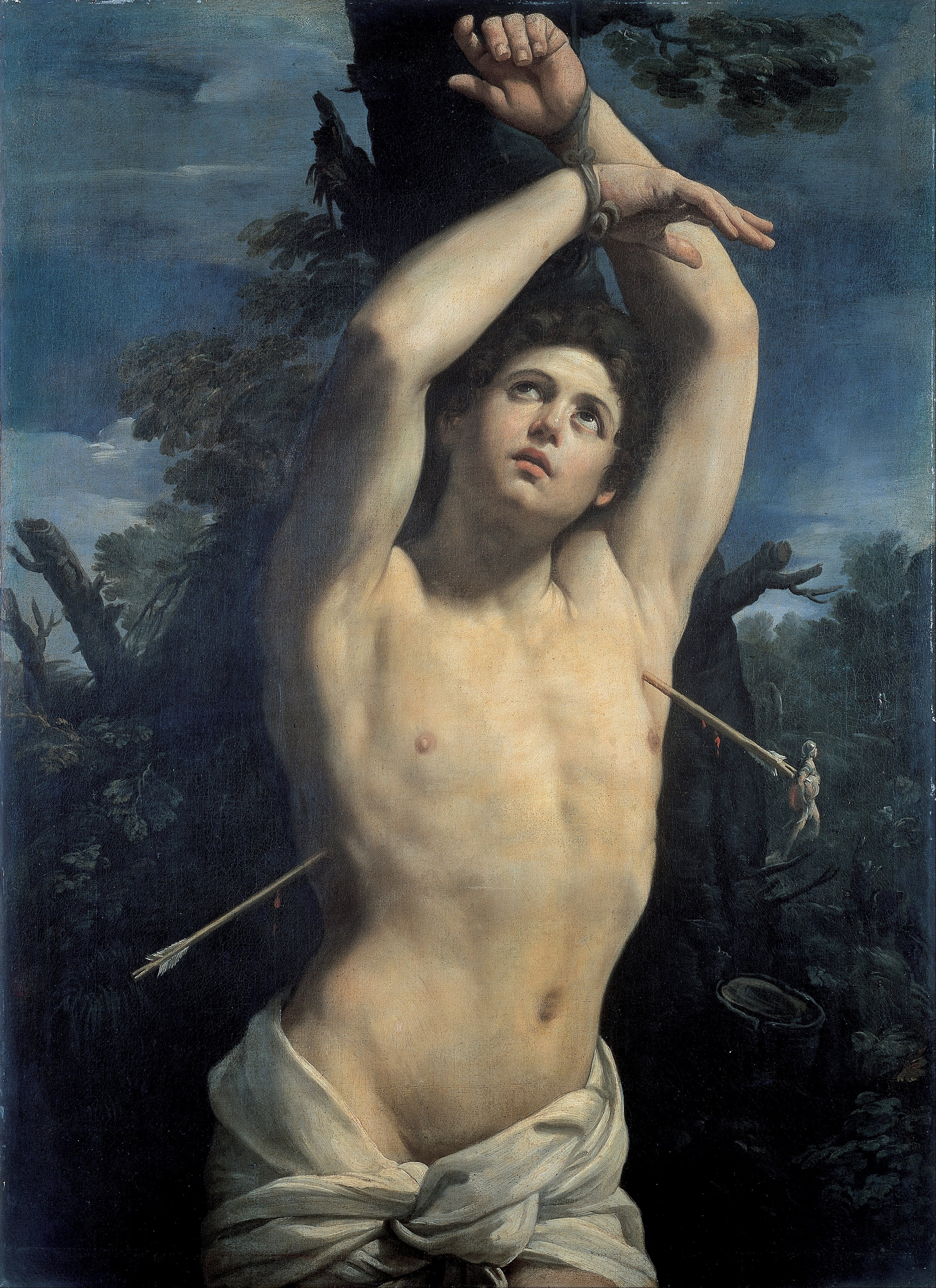
Kochan finds an image of Guido Reni's Saint Sebastian and is attracted to it.

In the first chapter of the book, Kochan recalls a memory of a picture book from when he was four years old. Even at that young age, Kochan approached a single picture of a heroic-looking European knight on horseback almost as pornography, gazing at it longingly and hiding it away, embarrassed, when others came to see what he was doing. When his nurse tells him that the knight is actually Joan of Arc, Kochan, wanting the knight to be a paragon of manliness, is immediately and forever put off by the picture, annoyed that a woman would dress in men's clothing.

The word "mask" comes from how Kochan develops his own false personality that he uses to present himself to the world. Early on, as he develops a fascination with his friend Omi's body during puberty, he believes that everybody around him is also hiding their true feelings from each other, everybody participating in a "reluctant masquerade". As he grows up, he tries to fall in love with a girl named Sonoko, but is continuously tormented by his latent homosexual urges, and is unable to ever truly love her.

== Reception ==
The initial reception of Confessions of a Mask in the English-speaking world was somewhat mixed, but ultimately positive; over time, this autobiographical novel came to be seen as one of Mishima's most important works.

An anonymous reviewer for Kirkus Reviews opines: "As a novel there is very little to recommend this painful account of retarded sexuality, but as a testament to the current enthusiasm with which the Japanese have embraced Western literary traditions of the last forty years at the expense of their own heritage, Confessions of a Mask makes a grim and forceful impression."

In the New York Times, Ben Ray Redman writes: "This book will increase American awareness of [Mishima's] skill; but it will also, I imagine, arouse in many readers as much distaste as respect . . . In Confessions of a Mask a literary artist of delicate sensibility and startling candor, has chosen to write for the few rather than the many."

Writing for the Japan Times, Iain Maloney notes that: "In many ways Confessions is the key text to understanding Mishima's later novels. In it, he explores the poles of his psyche, his homosexuality and his romantic/erotic attraction to warfare and combat. It is a scathing, unflinching examination of the darkness at the far corners of the human mind."
