= Junichi Yamakawa =

Japanese manga artist

- 山川純一
- Years active: 1982–1988
- Known for: Gay manga
- Notable work: Kuso Miso Technique; Umi Kara Kita Otoko

Junichi Yamakawa (山川純一, Yamakawa Jun'ichi) is a pseudonymous Japanese manga artist. A creator of gay manga, his works were published in the gay men's magazine Barazoku and its manga supplement Bara-Komi in the 1980s. Yamakawa's manga are distinguished by their depictions of male–male sexual relations in comedic and heightened scenarios. While Yamakawa's works were originally published in relative obscurity, his 1987 manga Kuso Miso Technique gained notoriety as an Internet meme in the early 2000s, leading to newfound public interest in his manga.

== Biography ==
=== Life and career ===
Essentially no direct information about Yamakawa's life exists, as the artist has never made public appearances or statements, and published no works beyond his contributions to Barazoku in the 1980s. Most information about his life and career is sourced from Ito Bungaku, editor-in-chief of Barazoku, who himself lost contact with Yamakawa after the artist stopped contributing to the magazine. According to Itō, he first encountered Yamakawa after the artist came to the offices of Barazoku to submit an unsolicited manuscript for publication. "Junichi Yamakawa" was a pseudonym used by the artist; he never disclosed his legal name, address, or contact information to Itō. Itō estimated Yamakawa to have been in his late thirties at the time of their first meeting, and that he appeared to be of modest economic means; he told Itō that he had been working as a part-time manga artist and that his manuscript fees from Barazoku were his sole source of regular income.

Roughly thirty one-shots (single-chapter manga) authored by Yamakawa, each around sixteen pages in length, were published in Barazoku and its manga supplement Bara-Komi from 1982 to 1988. Among these were Umi Kara Kita Otoko, published in Barazoku in 1984, and Kuso Miso Technique, published in the second issue of Bara-Komi in 1987. According to Itō, the editorial staff at Barazoku strongly disliked Yamakawa's manga, as the slender men the artist drew deviated from the magazine's typical style of masculine and muscular men. Itō was eventually pressured into ceasing publication of Yamakawa's manga, but nevertheless continued to accept submissions from the artist for several years, and paid him a manuscript fee even for works that went unpublished.

Three collected volumes of manga by Yamakawa were published between 1986 and 1988 by Keisei Publishing; when the company went bankrupt, the remaining inventory of unsold copies was purchased and sold by Daini Shobo, the publisher of Barazoku.

=== Internet popularity ===
While Yamakawa's manga was originally published in relative obscurity, Kuso Miso Technique gained notoriety in the early 2000s after pirated scans of the manga were posted to image boards such as 2channel. The manga and excerpts from it subsequently became a popular Internet meme, and led to newfound public interest in Yamakawa's manga. An anthology of works by Yamakawa published in 2003 in response to the artist's new popularity quickly sold out of its first two print runs, and by 2010 was in its ninth edition. A variety of official merchandise related to Kuso Miso Technique has been produced, including t-shirts and body pillow covers.

In 2006, Itō discovered the original artwork for thirteen works by Yamakawa in storage, which were subsequently auctioned. When Itō's house was repossessed due to financial issues arising from the insolvency of Barazoku, four unpublished manuscripts by Yamakawa were discovered, which were printed in Barazoku and later collected in an anthology.

=== Current status ===
Yamakawa's whereabouts from the late 1980s onwards are unknown; Itō stated in 2008 that he strongly suspects he is deceased. Itō held the copyrights for Yamakawa's works, and in 2013 transferred the copyright for Kuso Miso Technique to the production company IKD International. In 2018, the copyrights for all of Yamakawa's works, including Kuso Miso Technique, were transferred to the entertainment company Cyzo.

== Style ==
Yamakawa's work is distinguished by its depiction of male-male sexual relations with heightened and exaggerated storylines. He depicted themes of male-male romance and sex across a wide range of genres, including historical drama, mystery, and wartime drama. Visually, his art is defined by depictions of handsome, slender men with long hair and long faces, with Itō comparing his visual style to that of shōjo manga.

== Bibliography ==
- Aniki ni Doki Doki (兄貴にドキドキ), 1986, Keisei Publishing
- Kimi ni Nyan Nyan (君にニャンニャン), 1986, Keisei Publishing
- Wakuwaku Boy (ワクワクＢＯＹ), 1988, Keisei Publishing, ISBN 4874443745
- Uho!! Ī Otoko-tachi Yamajun Pāfekuto (ウホッ!! いい男たち ヤマジュン・パーフェクト), 2003, Daini Shobo, ISBN 4835440676
- Uho!! Ī Otoko-tachi 2: Yamajun Mi-happyō Sakuhin-shū (ウホッ!! いい男たち2〜ヤマジュン・未発表作品集), 2009, Fukkan. ISBN 978-4835444062
