= Sadao Hasegawa =

Japanese artist (1945 – 1999)

- Born: 1945; Tōkai, Japan
- Died: November 20, 1999 (aged 54); Bangkok, Thailand
- Known for: Erotic illustration

Sadao Hasegawa (長谷川 サダオ, Hasegawa Sadao; 1945 – November 20, 1999) was a Japanese graphic artist known for creating homoerotic fetish art. His works are noted for their extensive detail, elaborate fantasy settings, and for their juxtaposition of elements from Japanese, Balinese, Thai, Tibetan Buddhist, African, and Indian art. While Hasegawa focused primarily on depictions of muscular male physique, he often incorporated extreme sexual themes in his works, including bondage and sadomasochism. His art is noted for strong mystical and spiritual overtones.

== Biography ==
Hasegawa was born in 1945 in the Tōkai region of Japan. In his twenties, he traveled to India and began to take up drawing. His first solo exhibition, "Sadao Hasegawa's Alchemism: Meditation for 1973" was held in 1973 in Tokyo, Japan, and featured oil paintings, collages, and sculptures. In 1978, Hasegawa's art was published for the first time in Barazoku, a monthly magazine for gay men; he would later go on to be published in Sabu, Samson, and Adon.

Hasegawa cited Go Mishima and Tom of Finland among his influences, calling the former "a master illustrator of the male physique" in an obituary written in 1989 for Barazoku. His early works, directly inspired by Tom of Finland, reflected European art styles. Beginning in the late 1980s, Hasegawa began making regular trips to Bali and Thailand, resulting in a greater focus on Asian iconography and mythology in his art.

On November 20, 1999, Hasegawa killed himself by hanging in Bangkok, Thailand. His artwork was initially disposed of by his family, though it was recovered upon their discovery of a note – alongside a portrait of Yukio Mishima painted on a stone – granting ownership of his works to Gallery Naruyama in Tokyo. Six unseen paintings were discovered among Hasegawa's estate, which were shown in "Linga", a posthumous exhibition at Gallery Naruyama in 2000. Today, Gallery Naruyama holds the majority of Hasegawa's collected works.

== Legacy ==
Hasegawa is regarded as one of the most influential creators of homoerotic art in Japan. Bungaku Itō, the founding editor of Barazoku, described Hasegawa's art as "transcend[ing] the level of pornography, emulating likenesses found in Buddhist art." Despite this, Hasegawa's artwork has received limited exposure in Japan, with only a single monograph – Paradise Visions, published in 1996 by Kochi Studio – having been published domestically.

Hasegawa refused numerous requests to exhibit and distribute his work internationally, though Sadao Hasegawa: Paintings and Drawings, a collection the artist's magazine work, was published by the British publishing house Gay Men's Press in 1990.

In 2022 UK publisher Baron Books released a first posthumous monograph of Hasegawa's rarely-published archive.

== See also ==
- Homosexuality in Japan
- Shunga (Japanese erotic painting)
- Tamotsu Yato (Japanese photographer acknowledged as an influence by Hasegawa)

== Additional reading ==
- Tagame, Gengoroh. Gay Erotic Art in Japan vol. 2: Transitions of Gay Fantasy in the Times, POT Publishing Co. (2006).
