= Tamotsu Yatō =

Japanese photographer (1928–1973)

- Born: Tamotsu Takeda; 1925(?); Nishinomiya
- Died: May 20, 1973; Tokyo
- Occupation: photographer
- Known for: male nude photography

Tamotsu Yato (矢頭 保, Yatō Tamotsu; 1925(?) – May 20, 1973) was a Japanese photographer and occasional actor responsible for pioneering Japanese homoerotic photography and creating iconic black-and-white images of the Japanese male.

== Biography ==
Yato was born in Nishinomiya in 1925 as Tamotsu Takeda. He was self-taught photographer and during his life never took part in any of the many photographic organizations which was customary in Japan that time.

During his life he had been a day laborer, as well as working at the Nichigeki theater.

Tamotsu Yato was a friend and collaborator of the writer Yukio Mishima and the film critic Donald Richie, as well as a long-term romantic partner of Meredith Weatherby, an expatriate American publisher and translator of Mishima's works into English. Meredith, who was president of the Weatherhill publishing house, bought Yato his first camera, and his friends showed him how to use it. Yato completed three volumes of photography.

In the preface to his 1972 collection Otoko, Tamotsu Yato wrote:

when these young men stand before my camera I never find in their nudity the slightest trace of vulgarity or coarseness. Instead, it is a thrilling moment that arouses in me much the same emotions as those I feel when I see a perfect fruit just fresh from the tree, or a brand-new expensive camera still in the shop window.

— Tamotsu Yatō, Otoku

Even though Yato's work received only a limited public distribution, it has attained a cult following and has been acknowledged as a major influence by a number of artists working with male erotica. Thus, Sadao Hasegawa remarks in his Paradise Visions: "Tamotsu Yato achieved fame by creating Otoko, a picture book. He photographed Yukio Mishima, nude. His subjects: traditional, muscular, unsophisticated countryside men, are mostly extinct today. Otoko was valuable because you could see these long-bodied, stout-legged, cropped hair, square-jawed men... Good-bye, men of Nippon!"

Tamotsu Yatō died in sleep in his apartment in Takadanobaba from a heart condition at the age of forty-eight. After his death, Meredith Weatherby took his negatives to California. They later went into the possession of Fumio Mizuno, who owns them to this day.

== Books by Tamotsu Yato ==
- Taidō: Nihon no bodibirudā-tachi (体道：日本のボディビルダーたち). Tokyo: Weatherhill, 1966; English version: Young Samurai: Bodybuilders of Japan, New York: Grove Press, 1967. With an introduction by Yukio Mishima.
- Hadaka matsuri (裸祭り). Tokyo: Bijutsu Shuppansha, 1969; English version: Naked festival: A Photo-Essay, New York/Tokyo: John Weatherhill, 1968. With an introduction by Yukio Mishima and essays by Tatsuo Hagiwara, Mutsuro Takahashi, and Kozo Yamaji. Translated and adapted for Western readers by Meredith Weatherby and Sachiko Teshima.
- Otoko: Photo-Studies of the Young Japanese Male, Los Angeles: Rho-Delta Press, 1972. Dedicated to the memory of Yukio Mishima.

== See also ==
- Homosexuality in Japan
