= Patrick Conlon (artist) =

American illustrator and tattooist

Patrick Conlon is an illustrator and tattooist in New York City. He wrote and illustrated the graphic novel Swarm, and collaborated with Michael Manning, another fetish artist, on The Tranceptor Series. He has tattooed and worked with several celebrities, most notably Daniel Day-Lewis and a small umbrella piece on Rihanna.

In the 1990s, Conlon worked as a tattooist in the San Francisco shop Everlasting, where he works whenever on the West coast. He can also be found at two shops in NYC, East Side Ink and Graceland. Conlon opened his own tattoo shop, Speakeasy Tattoo, in Peekskill, NY in 2012. In the late 1990s, he designed the characters and shared the illustration of The Tranceptor Series with Michael Manning. He completed the first volume of his painted graphic novel Swarm in 2002 and began working on a second. Volume 1 was published in June 2004. Part 2 appeared in sections in Sizzle magazine and has been published as a book in 2006. By September 2004, he was working with Manning on the second book in The Tranceptor Series.

Swarm is an erotic graphic novel in which a matriarchy with sexually active queen serviced by a swarm of servile males is threatened by the Planet Eater.

== Bibliography ==
- Conlon, Patrick; Manning, Michael. Tranceptor: The Way Station (Tranceptor Series), (San Francisco: Amerotica, 1998). ISBN 1-56163-211-2.
- Conlon, Patrick. Swarm Vol. 1, (New York: NBM, 2004). ISBN 1-56163-396-8
