= Rune Naito =

Japanese artist, writer, and designer

- 内藤 ルネ
- Undated portrait of Naito
- Born: Isao Naito; November 20, 1932; Okazaki, Aichi
- Died: October 24, 2007 (aged 74); Izu, Shizuoka
- Known for: Works pioneering the culture and aesthetic of kawaii; erotic illustrations for gay men's magazines
- Notable work: "Rune Girl", "Rune Panda"
- Style: Illustration
- Partner: Ryu Fujita
- Website: https://www.naitou-rune.jp/

Rune Naito (Japanese: 内藤 ルネ, Hepburn: Naitō Rune; November 20, 1932 – October 24, 2007) was the pen name of Japanese artist, illustrator, writer, and designer Isao Naito (内藤功, Naitō Isao). His illustrations of "large-headed" (nitōshin) baby-faced girls, first drawn for Japanese magazines in the mid-1950s, are credited with pioneering the contemporary culture and aesthetic of kawaii (lit. "lovable" or "cute"). He is further noted for his contributions to the Japanese gay men's magazine Barazoku, the first commercially circulated gay magazine in Japan.

== Biography ==
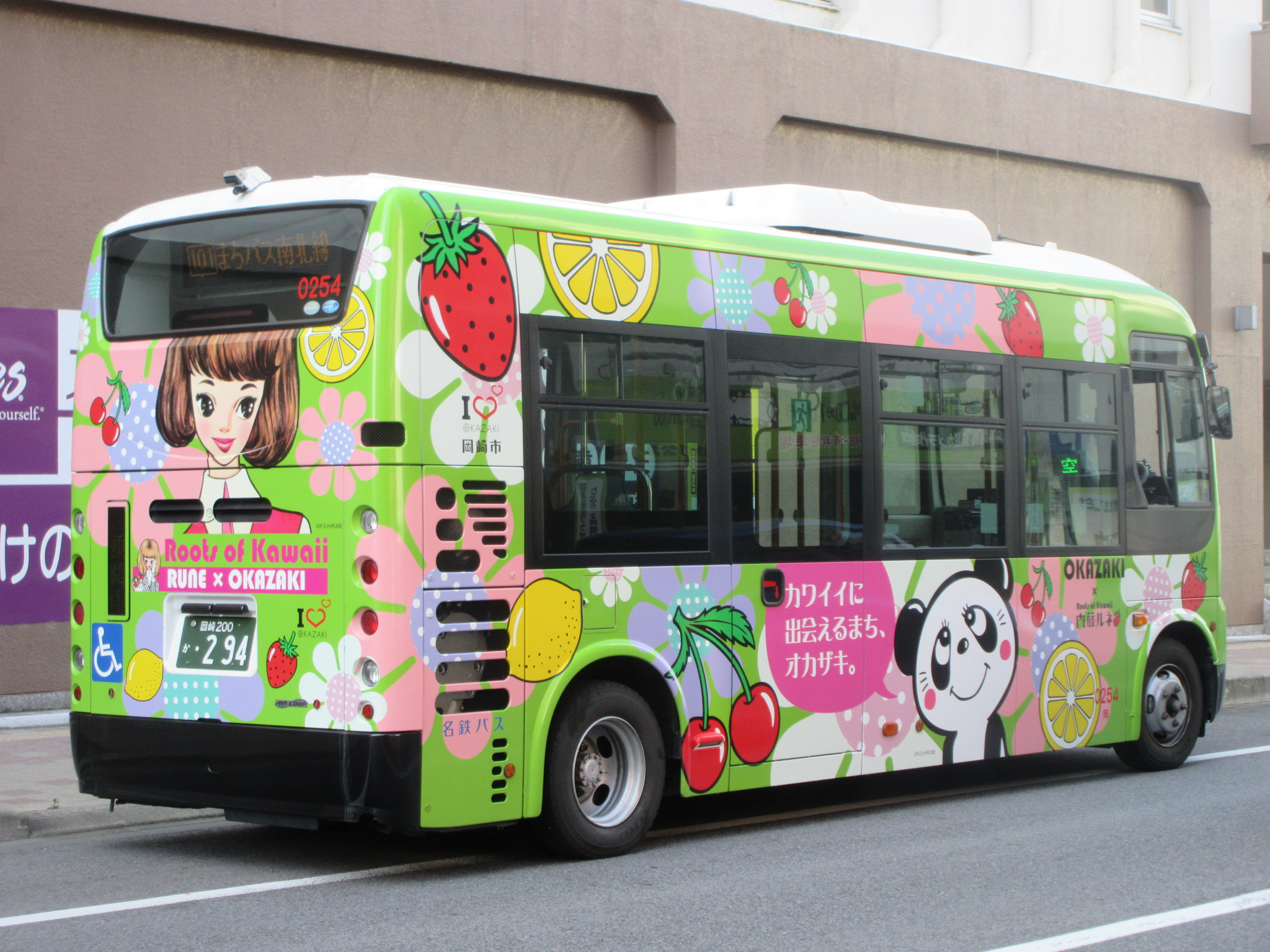
"Rune Girl" and "Rune Panda" on a bus in Okazaki.

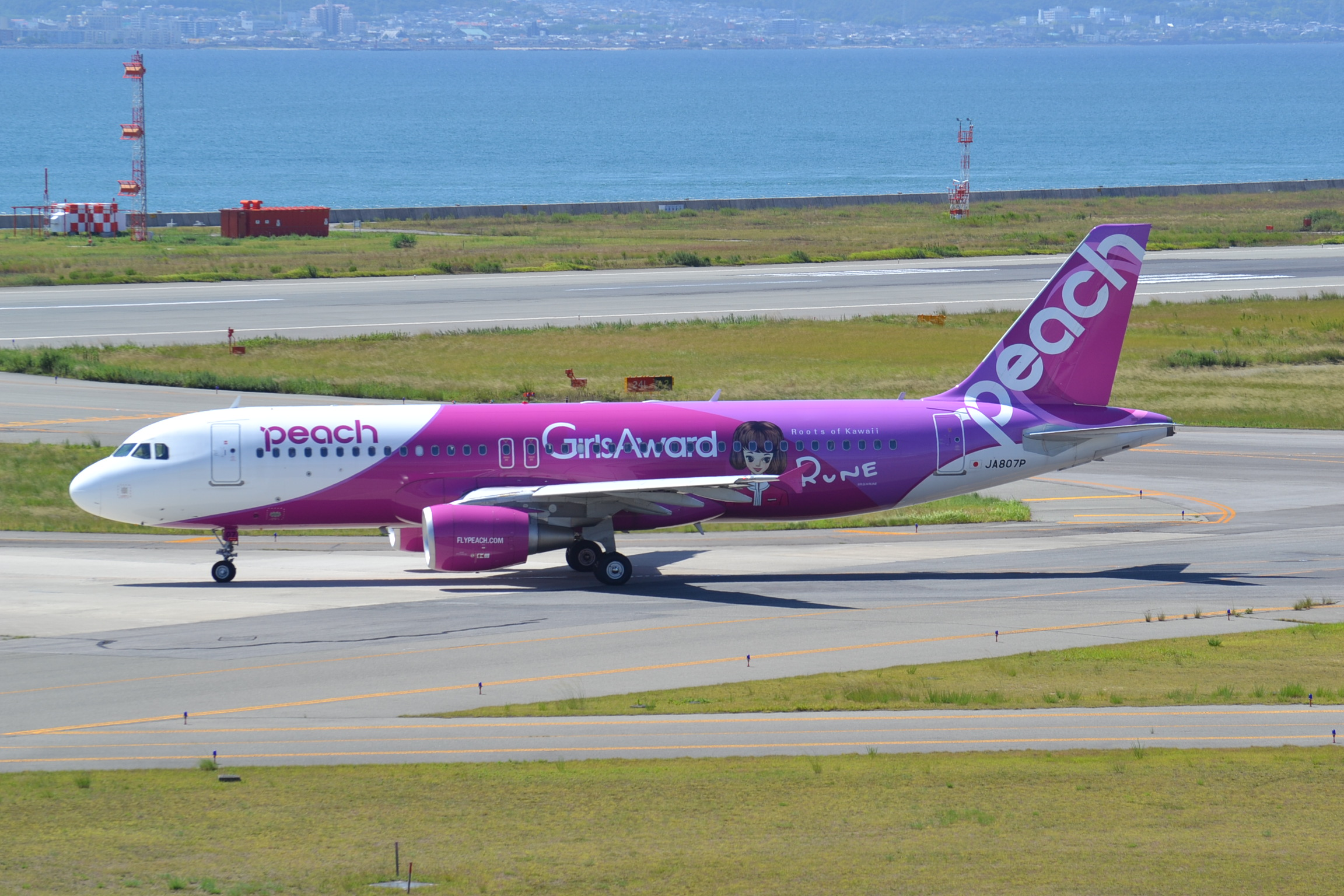
"Rune Girl" on a Peach Aviation Airbus A320.

Naito was born in Okazaki, Aichi. He pursued illustration after discovering the art of Jun'ichi Nakahara as a child, and began correspondence with the artist after graduating high school. Nakahara invited Naito to study under him as an assistant, prompting Naito to relocate from Okazaki to Tokyo at age 19. In 1954, Nakahara became a contributor to Junior Soleil, a girls' magazine edited by Nakahara, where he produced illustrations and wrote a fashion column titled "Fairy Memo". He drew under the pen name "Rune", as a reference to filmmaker René Clément.

Naito's "Rune Girl" illustrations, first published in Junior Soleil, were distinguished by their large heads (nitōshin) and baby-faced features. These illustrations are credited with pioneering the concept of kawaii, expanding the meaning of the word beyond its use as synonymous with "childish" to define what would become a culture and aesthetic. Children, fruit, and animals were common motifs in his art; after seeing pandas at the London Zoo in 1971, Naito created "Rune Panda", who would become one of his most ubiquitous and popular characters.

Naito's first books, Konnichiwa Mademoiselle and Junior's Diary, were published in 1959 and 1960, respectively. He departed girls' magazines in the 1960s to illustrate for women's, fashion, and interior design magazines. From the 1960s to the 1980s, he produced his own line of commercial goods, including glassware, tableware, and stickers.

In the 1970s and 1980s, Naito contributed gay erotic illustrations to Barazoku, the first commercially circulated gay men's magazine in Japan; the cover to the first issue of the magazine was designed by Naito's long-time partner Ryu Fujita. Naito's works were not overtly pornographic, instead depicting what he described as "cheerfulness and sexiness" that did not make men "look degraded." Naito was publicly closeted for the majority of his life, and did not come out as gay until his 2005 memoir Subete o Nakushite (After Losing Everything). Though Naito's erotic illustrations were historically excluded from retrospectives of his work, recent exhibitions (such as 2019's "Roots of Kawaii") have begun to include them.

Beginning in the 1980s, Naito began to create works that were a departure from his early kawaii aesthetic, such as oil paintings and freehand sketches influenced by Henri Rousseau. On October 24, 2007, Naito died of acute heart failure in his home in Izu, Shizuoka at the age of 74. While Naito was widely recognized in Japan in his lifetime, his works have continued to grow in popularity since his death. In 2011, 6%DOKIDOKI founder Sebastian Masuda launched "Rune Boutique", an exhibition and pop-up shop featuring Naito's works, in Los Angeles. In 2018, Peach Aviation launched a plane featuring artwork of Rune Girl.

== Exhibitions ==
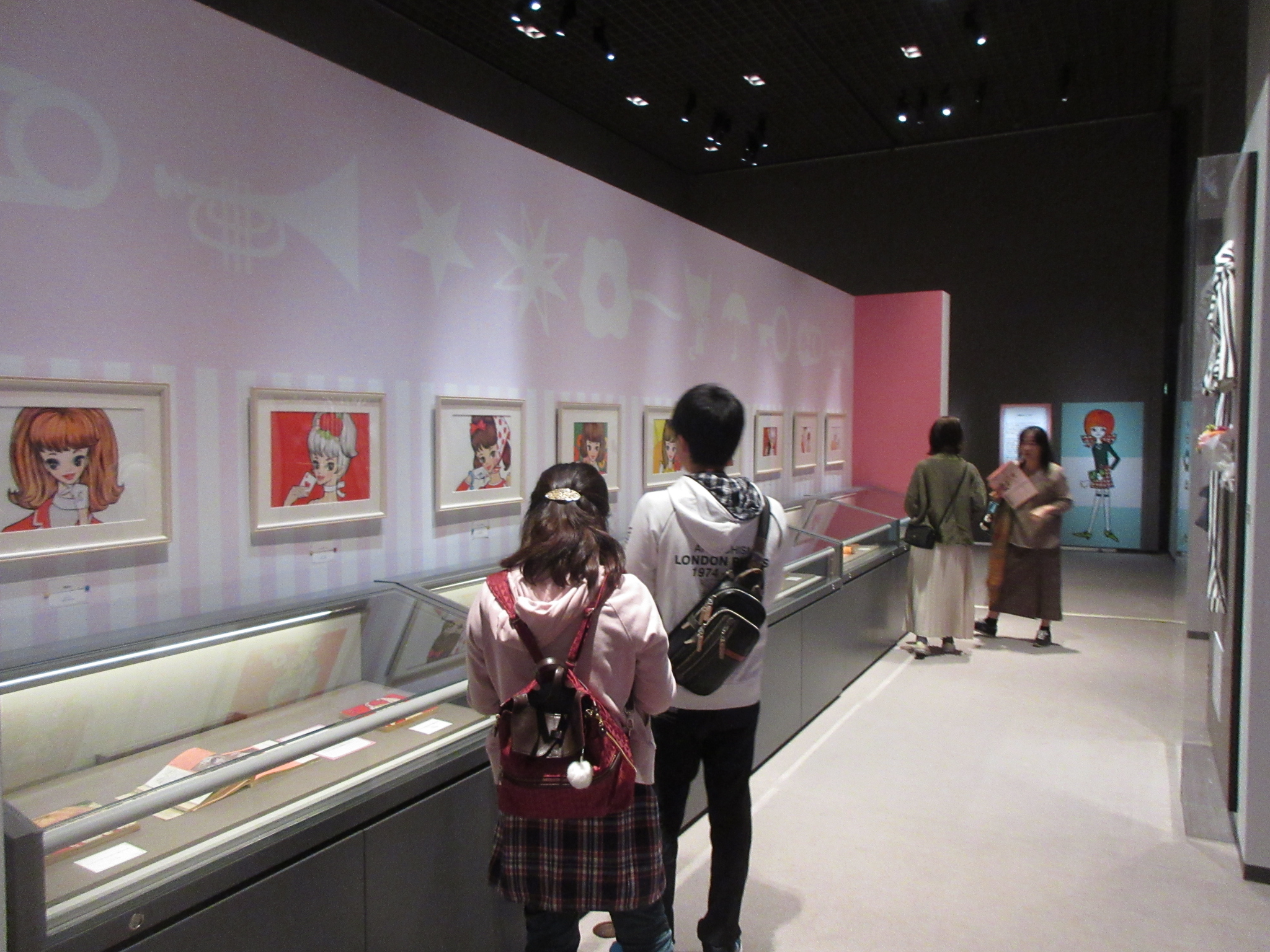
"Roots of Kawaii" at Okazaki Mindscape Museum in 2019.

- 2001: Rune Naito Doll Museum, Shuzenji, Shizuoka
- 2002: Yayoi Kusama Museum, Tokyo
- 2005: Yayoi Kusama Museum, Tokyo
- 2018: Daimaru Umeda, Umeda, Osaka
- 2018: Aeon Mall Okazaki, Okazaki, Aichi
- 2019: Okazaki Mindscape Museum, Okazaki, Aichi – "Roots of Kawaii"
