= Antoine Bernhart =

French illustrator (born 1950)

- Born: May 1, 1950 (age 75); Alsace, France
- Occupation: Illustrator
- Known for: Erotic illustrations

Antoine Bernhart is a French illustrator, born in Alsace on May 1, 1950. He lives and works in Strasbourg.

== Career ==
Bernhart's first works were published in the surrealist magazine Phases in 1968. His early drawings, characterized by a clear-line style, were highly detailed and depicted erotic, carnal entanglements. Bernhart was eventually excluded from the Phases group because his drawings were considered too pornographic.

In the early 1980s, he began using goose quill pens and India ink on watercolor paper, experimenting graphically with splashes and drips. He also introduced the use of mechanical shading (Letraset) for gray tones in his drawings. His work gained notoriety for its themes of underground rock and counterculture of the time: pin-ups, rockers, psychobilly, garage rock, punk, rockabilly, zombies, and bondage scenes. He created numerous illustrations for album covers and concert posters for bands such as The Meteors, The Rattlers, The Vibes, Tall Boys, Screaming Kids, and The Cannibals.

Beginning in the 1990s, after several trips to Japan and a growing fascination with Japanese erotic culture, his work became more radical. It began to incorporate a mix of trash and subversive themes, often featuring characters resembling mechanical dolls in macabre erotic scenes. His works often depict mutilation, rape, zoophilia, and coprophagia. Bernhart draws inspiration from the dark tales of the Grimm Brothers, the paintings of Balthus, and the writings of Marquis de Sade and Georges Bataille.

Antoine Bernhart’s "pornographic" work (in the most radical sense) aims to be a theater built on our abyss.

Bernhart's works have been exhibited at the Tomi Ungerer Museum, the Musée de l'érotisme, the Bongoût Gallery in Berlin, and the MAMCO in Geneva.

== Bibliography ==
- Kinshoku Club. Bologna: Mondo Bizzarro Press. 2000. p. 100. ISBN 978-88-87581-07-2.
- Naburi Naburare. Berlin: Bongoût. 2000. OCLC 890391162.
- Rope Rapture & Bloodshed. Bologna: Mondo Bizzarro Press. 2001.
- Spellbound. Berlin: Bongoût. 2003. OCLC 881446920.
- Igyou No Soiree. Bologna: Mondo Bizzarro Press. 2003. ISBN 978-88-87581-18-8.
- Schneck Machine im Belze Bummere. Berlin: Bongoût. 2005. OCLC 890402625.
- Skull Skoll, Royal!. Berlin: Bongoût. 2008. p. 220. ISBN 978-3-940907-03-5.
- Let's Have Some Fun. Berlin: Bongoût. 2007. OCLC 852409705.
- Im Dunkle Wald. Berlin: Bongoût. 2008. p. 150. ISBN 978-3-940907-04-2.
- Gebrüder Grimm on Hexenschnaps. Berlin: Gfeller & Hellsgård. 2013. OCLC 874093867.
- In the Wood. Marseille: Le Dernier Cri. 2015.
