= Otto Schoff =

German painter (1884–1938)

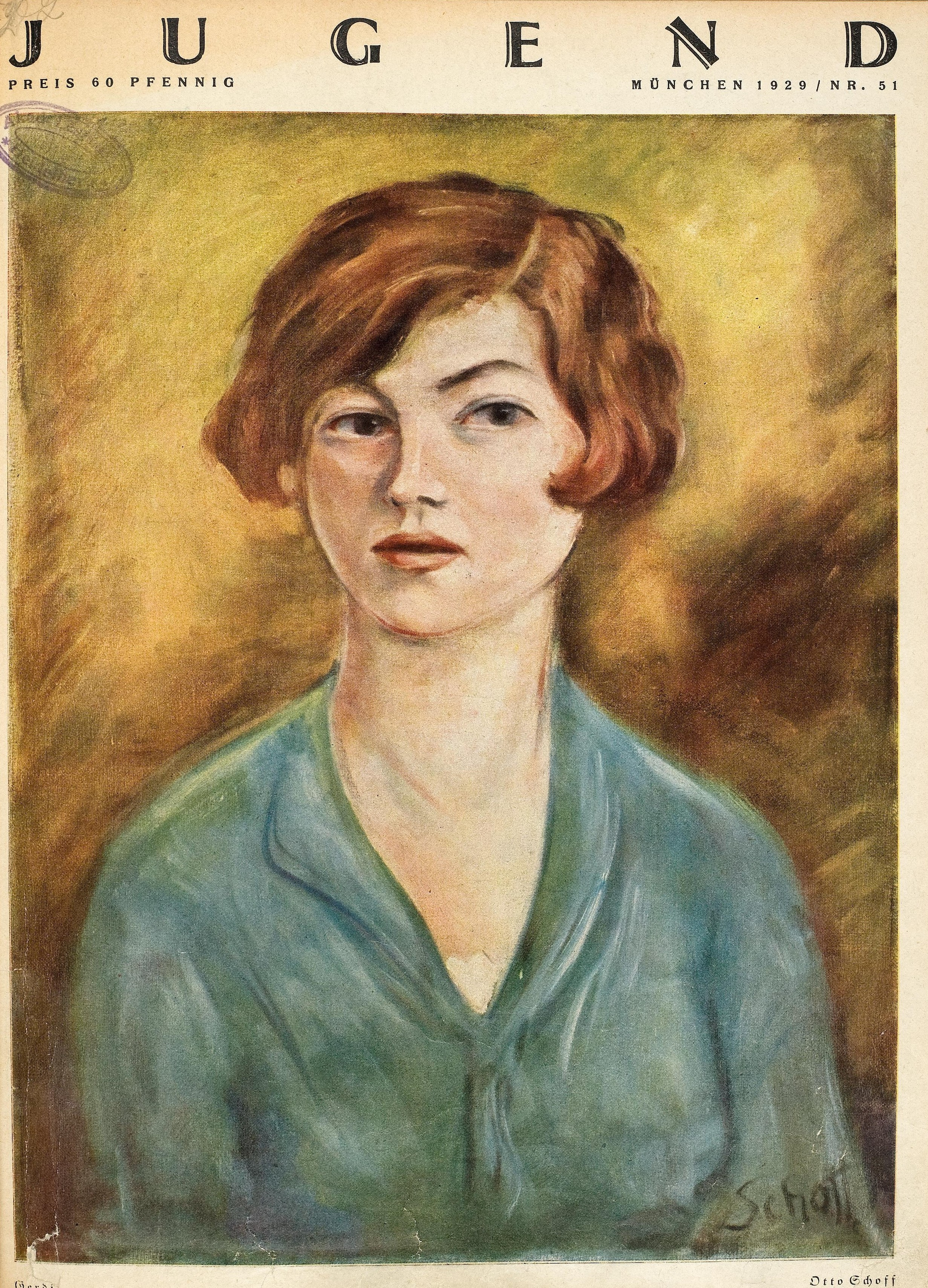
Gerdi, on the cover of Jugend, no. 51 (1929)

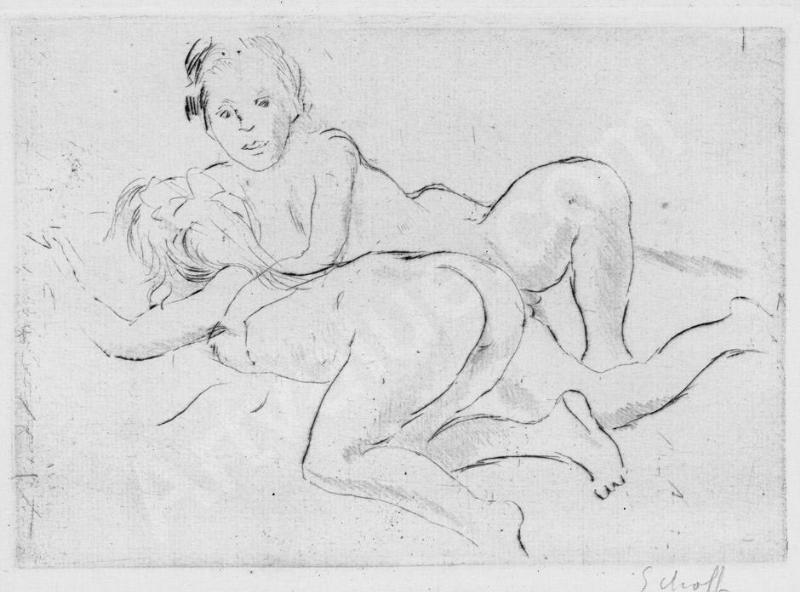
Untitled (c. 1910)

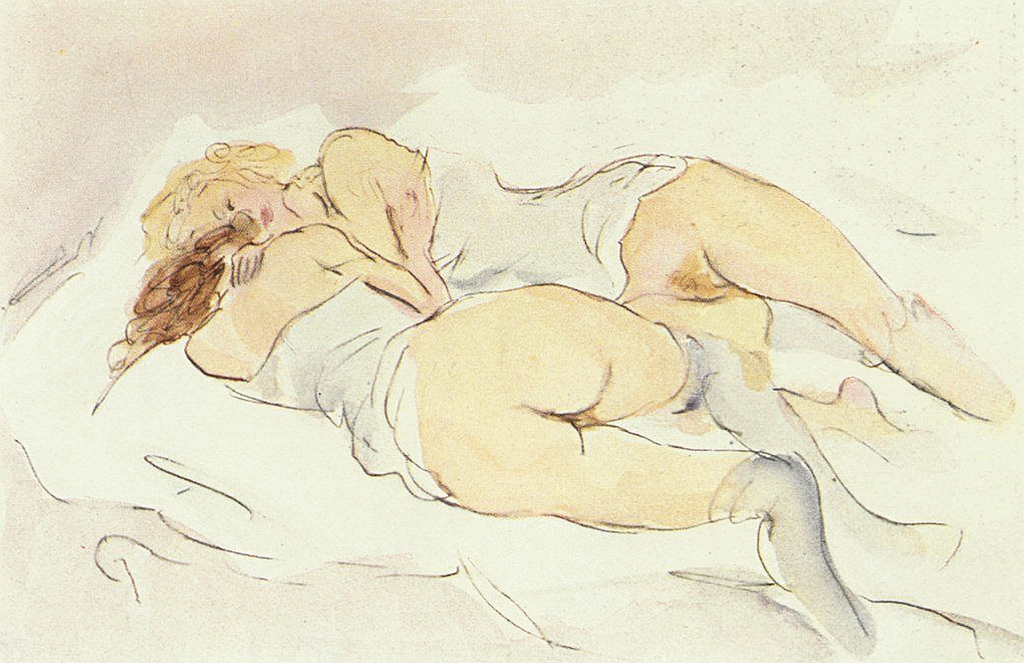
Siesta (1920s)

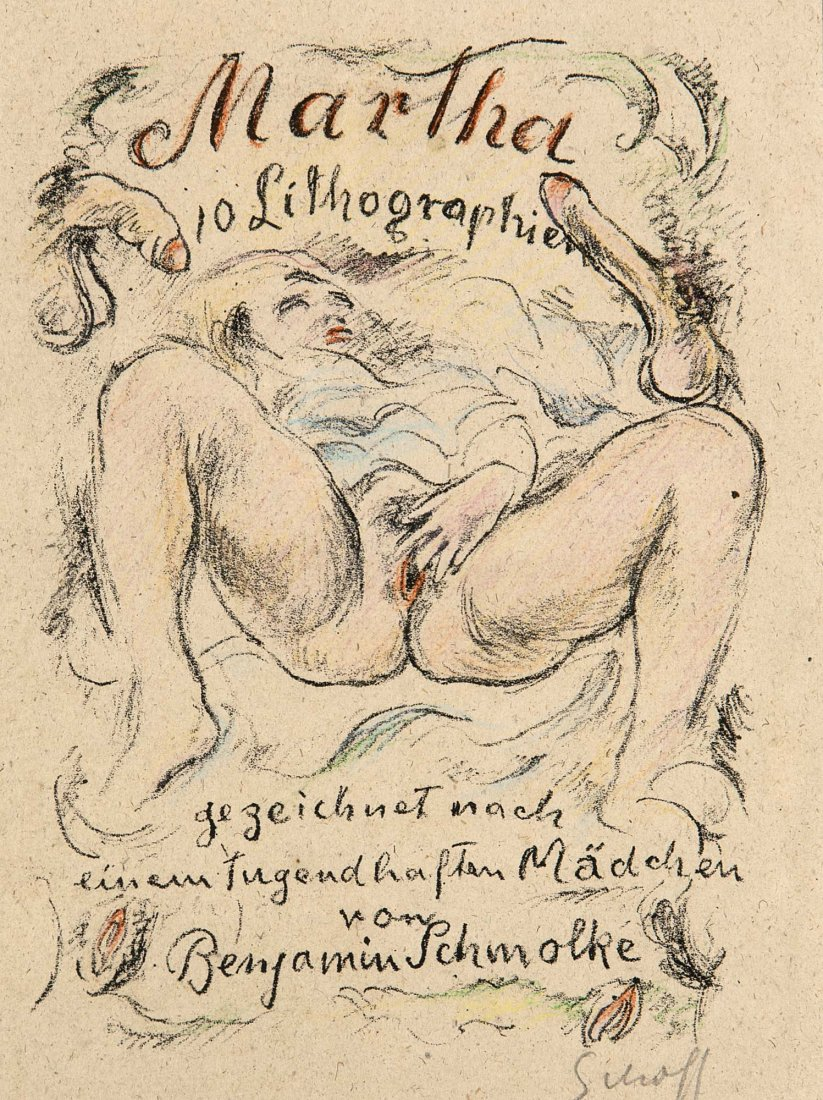
Martha, one of a series of 10 colour lithographs (c. 1920)

Otto Schoff (24 May 1888 – 3 July 1938) was a German painter and engraver.

== Life ==
Otto Schoff was born in Bremen on 24 May 1888. He received instruction at the Kunstgewerbeschule on the recommendation of Gustav Pauli, the director of the Kunsthalle Bremen. He continued his studies in Frankfurt and Darmstadt, and under Emil Orlík at the Unterrichtsanstalt des Kunstgewerbemuseums Berlin. Schoff made a living in Berlin producing designs for glass paintings. An annual grant from the City of Bremen funded his stay in Paris from 1913 to 1914 with George Grosz and Herbert Fiedler to attend classes at the Académie Colarossi.

Back in Berlin, he exhibited at the Graphisches Kabinett J. B. Neumann. During active service in the First World War, he produced drawings and watercolours for German magazines. After suffering from poison gas and a period of convalescence in a field hospital, he returned to Berlin in 1918. His work was promoted by Fritz Gurlitt and Alfred Flechtheim. He contributed to exhibitions of the Berlin Secession from 1926 to 1929, the Zweiten Ausstellung nachimpressionistischer Kunst at the Nationalgalerie in 1928, and the Seit Liebermann in Deutschland in 1930.

From 1935, Schoff was increasingly persecuted for his art. He was labelled a degenerate artist by the National Socialists and prohibited from painting. The Kunsthalle Bremen apparently destroyed one of his pictures: a depiction of a girl's head.

On 3 July 1938, Schoff suffered a fatal heart attack while his rooms were being searched by the Gestapo. His fiancée, Ilse Thäns, committed suicide soon after.

== Themes ==
Otto Schoff created many depictions of carefree male and female homosexuality, and he illustrated books by Pierre Louÿs and August von Platen. He also made many drawings of prominent figures in the Berlin homosexual subculture, including people like Christian Schad, Guy de Laurence (Erich Godal), Renée Sintenis, Georg Ehrlich, Martel Schwichtenberg, Margit Gaal, Paul Kamm, and Karl Arnold. Many of the homoerotic drawings depicted only children or adolescents; depicting adult homosexuality was still taboo.

== Selected works ==
=== Paintings ===
- Sappho oder die Lesbierinnen ('Sappho and the Lesbians'), 1920
- Portrait eines Mannes mit Hut und Pfeife ('Portrait of a Man with a Hat and a Pipe'), 1927
- Hinter den Kulissen ('Behind the Scenes'), oil on canvas, n.d.
- Liebespaar ('Lovers'), pen and ink and watercolour, n.d.

=== Engravings ===
- Berliner Vorstadt ('Berlin Vorstadt'), 10 etchings. Berlin: Fritz Gurlitt, 1935

=== Illustrated books ===
- Étienne de Jouy: Sappho oder Die Lesbierinnen. Mit Radierungen von Otto Schoff [Translated by Balduin Alexander Möllhausen]. Berlin: Gurlitt, 1920
- Gottfried Keller: Romeo und Julia auf dem Dorfe. Erzählung [With an introduction by Anna Stemsen; lithographed by Schoff]. Berlin: Freiheit, 1921
- August von Platen: Der verfehmte Eros. Aus den Gedichten des Grafen August von Platen [Selected]. Berlin: F. Gurlitt, 1921
- Ernst Wenger: Bacchanale der Liebe. Verse [With seven etchings by Schoff]. Berlin: Reuß & Pollack, 1922
- Tibullus: Das Buch Marathus. Elegien der Knabenliebe. [Translated by Alfred Richard Meyer; with five plates by Schoff]. Berlin: Gurlitt, 1928
