= Jeff Gord =

Bondage artist, sculptor and photographer

Jeffrey E. Owen
- Born: May 5, 1946
- Died: September 3, 2013 (aged 67)
- Known for: Bondage photography; Bondage rigging; Forniphilia

Jeffrey E. Owen (5 May 1946 - 3 September 2013), better known by his alias Jeff Gord, was a bondage artist, photographer and filmmaker. who specialized in the forniphilia subgenre, a form of objectifying sexual bondage which involves the subject being tightly bound and expected to stay immobile for a prolonged period. He described his work as being for women's pleasure, saying "if the women don't enjoy it it's no good for me".

== Background ==
Born in the United Kingdom, Gord described himself as a "mad bondage scientist". He initially founded his own publishing company in 1992, publishing erotic books specialising in bondage stories. In 1997, he launched and maintained the website "House of Gord" on the subject. His influences included Robert Bishop, Eric Stanton and John Willie.

He stated that his first interest in fetish had been when, as a small child, he saw an actress on stage wearing tight lycra, and wished he could tie her up so that she could not move.

Aaron Kunin has described Gord's vision of the human body as "as spectacular and thorough in its commitment to objectification as Busby Berkeley’s."

== Death ==
Gord died on 3 September 2013, at the age of 67.
