= Meredith Weatherby =

American editor

Oscar Meredith Weatherby (February 25, 1915 – June 27, 1997) was an American publisher who was the founder of Weatherhill Publications. He spent a large part of his life in Japan and is known in particular for his English translations of literary works by Yukio Mishima. Weatherby was also a long-term patron and romantic partner of the photographer Tamotsu Yato.

He also appeared in an acting role in the 1970 war movie Tora! Tora! Tora!, in which he played the part of the U.S. Ambassador to Japan, Joseph Grew.

A native of Waco, Texas, Weatherby died in La Jolla, California.

== Filmography ==
Year	Title	Role	Notes
1970	Tora! Tora! Tora!	Ambassador Joseph Grew	Uncredited
