= Sardax =

English fetish artist

Sardax is the pseudonym for a London-based English fetish artist specialising in female domination fantasy art. He has been described as "the great master of the femdom/fetish cartoon world", "the doyen of femdom art", and "the master of femdom art".

He started his fetish art career when a dominant woman requested he produce an illustration for her. While his art usually features women dominating men, he has also drawn images of submissive women. His work often features high-heeled shoes, worn by both men and women. He has stated that he has been influenced by Aubrey Beardsley and the Art Nouveau movement.

His work has also appeared repeatedly in numerous publications, including Leg Show and Skin Two magazine. He has also provided the cover illustrations for numerous books, as well as providing interior illustrations for other books. and is also known for his numerous portraits of professional dominatrices.

In addition to his magazine work and private commissions, Sardax has published two books, The Art of Sardax, published in 2007, and his own translation into English of Leopold von Sacher-Masoch's Venus in Furs. He has also collaborated with the clothing designer Afira.

Although he is devoted to illustrating fantasies of female domination, he has stated that real-world female domination is not part of his lifestyle.

== Bibliography ==
- The Art of Sardax, Erotic Print Society, April 2007, 155 pp. ISBN 9781904989226
- Venus in Furs, Dilston Press, 2013, 138 pp. ISBN 9781903908600
