= Robert Bishop (artist) =

American bondage artist and writer

Robert K. Bishop
- Born: 1945; Michigan, US
- Died: 1991 (aged 45–46)
- Occupation: Graphic artist
- Known for: BDSM art

Robert K. Bishop (1945–1991) was a bondage artist, author, photographer and bondage rigger best known for his images of restrained and gagged women published by the House of Milan, for which he also worked as production manager.

Bishop's main work period was during the 1970s and early 1980s. His work, mostly depicting women in stringent bondage, was largely monochrome, rendered using pencil, ink and airbrush. Many of the gags and restraints depicted in his art were invented by him.

== Early life ==
Robert Bishop was born in the U.S. state of Michigan in 1945.

In a 1981 interview with Geoffrey Merrick, Bishop described his interest in bondage as having been awakened in his early years through watching TV shows like Richard Diamond Private Eye, The Man from U.N.C.L.E. and Batman.

According to Bishop, after study in a technical college and work as a technical artist, and a time as a communication technician in the U.S. Navy, he was accepted into the art school of the Society of Arts and Crafts in Detroit.

== Career as fetish artist ==
In 1970, Bishop approached Centurian Publications for work drawing bondage illustrations for their catalogues. He was subsequently approached by Barbara Behr for work illustrating her bondage magazines.

Disputes over Harmony Productions' "love bondage" ethos led to his leaving Harmony Productions for House of Milan to follow his own path. He also worked for Centurian Publications and produced cover illustrations for numerous bondage novels by F. E. Campbell. He also both wrote and illustrated a series of stories describing the misadventures of the character "Fanni Hall".

Bishop was harshly critical of his own work, describing much of it in an editorial as "chaff".

He also made a small number of works depicting men being dominated by women, and work for gay magazines, but regarded them as inferior work because he had no passion for it. It has been suggested that Bishop also published under the pseudonym Ashely, but this is disputed.

The filmmaker and artist Jeff Gord cited Bishop's work as an inspiration for his own work.

Robert Bishop died by suicide in 1991, at the age of 46.

== Bibliography ==
- The First Erotic Art of Bishop, Van Nuys: Centurian / London Enterprises, 1980, 62pp.
- Bishop: The Art of Bondage #1, London Enterprises, Van Nuys, 1992
- Bishop: The Art of Bondage #2, London Enterprises, Van Nuys, 1993, 47pp.
- Bondage Katalog 1, 192pp.
- Bondage Katalog 2, 192pp.
- Bondage Katalog 3, 192pp.
- Fanni Hall, House of Milan Corp., 1977, 51pp.
