= Bongoût =

Christian "Meeloo" Gfeller and Anna Hellsgård worked as an artist duo under the Bongoût name to make prints, artist books and illustrations, often in collaboration with other notable artists (e.g. Seripop, Manuel Ocampo, Damien Deroubaix, David Sandlin, Jean Louis Costes...). Over 110 artist books have been printed in silkscreen under the name Bongoût. Bongoût is based in Berlin, Germany. Their artists books are in numerous museums and collections, such as the Museum of Modern Art in New York City, the San Francisco Museum of Modern Art, Harvard University's Fine Art library in Cambridge, MA, the Art Institute of Chicago and Yale University's "Art of the Book" Collection (Sterling Library), New Haven, CT.

After 17 years, Gfeller & Hellsgård closed the Bongoût chapter in 2012.

The publishing part of Bongoût was renamed Re:Surgo!, while the distribution Beuys On Sale.
