= List of fetish artists =

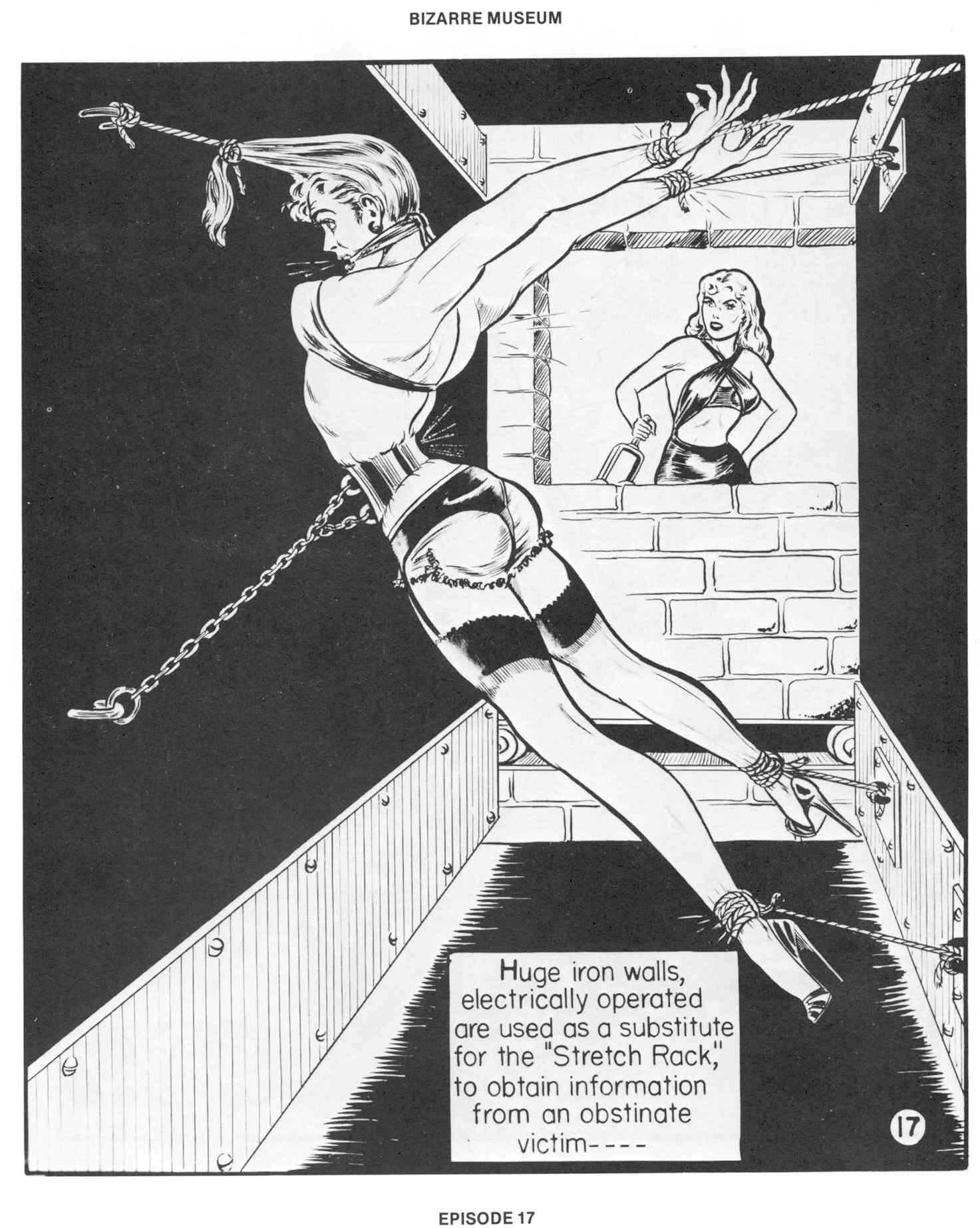
Example of fetish art by Eric Stanton

A fetish artist is a sculptor, illustrator, or painter who makes fetish art: art related to sexual fetishism and fetishistic acts.

== Fetish artists, 1800s–1920s ==
- Joseph Apoux
- Martin van Maële
- Otto Schoff
- Félicien Rops
- Franz von Bayros
- Tom Poulton
- Chéri Hérouard
- Gerda Wegener
- Aubrey Beardsley
- Joseph Kuhn-Régnier
- Seiu Ito
- Jean de Bosschère
- Édouard-Henri Avril
- Louis Malteste

== Fetish artists, 1930s–1990s ==
- Charles Guyette
- John Willie
- Eric Stanton (a.k.a. John Bee, Savage, Stanten)
- Steve Ditko (also known for his mainstream comics work)
- Gene Bilbrew (a.k.a. Eneg, Bondy)
- Hans Bellmer
- Robert Bishop (a.k.a. The Bishop)
- Namio Harukawa
- Antoine Bernhart
- Clovis Trouille
- Tom of Finland
- Dom Orejudos (a.k.a. Etienne, Stephen)
- Rex (artist)
- Neel Bate
- Tsuyoshi Yoshida
- Margaret Brundage
- Paul-Émile Bécat

== Recent fetish artists ==
- Roberto Baldazzini
- Patrick Conlon
- Drubskin
- Michael Manning
- Sardax
- Franco Saudelli
- Hajime Sorayama
- Monica Bonvicini

== See also ==
- Irving Klaw
- History of erotic depictions
- List of BDSM artists
