= Ito Bungaku =

Japanese entrepreneur, founder and editor-in-chief

Bungaku Ito
- 伊藤 文学
- Born: March 19, 1932 (age 93); Tokyo

Bungaku Ito (Jap. 伊藤 文學 new characters 伊藤 文学; born March 19, 1932) is a Japanese entrepreneur, founder and editor-in-chief of Japan's first commercially based homosexuality magazine Barazoku. He is the president of Daini-Shobo (Jap. 株式会社第二書房).

== Biography ==
Bungaku Ito was born in Tokyo in 1932 in a family of publisher Toichi Ito. Ito graduated from Komazawa University with a degree in Japanese literature. He was interested in Japanese poetry and was a member of university literary circles.

In 1948, Toichi Ito founded a small publishing house called Daini-Shobo. After graduation, Bungaku Ito joined his father's company and began to study publishing. Daini Shobo was not doing very well at the time: it focused on publishing collections of poetry, and although the reviews of some of them by literary critics were positive, they did not sell much.

In 1962, Bungaku Ito, who had almost taken over the publishing house by then, decided to publish a series of erotic literature called Night Books (Jap ナイト・ブックス). The series became popular, with more than 60 books published, and Ito decided that his publishing house needed to focus on erotica.

In 1966, Daini Shobo, run by Ito alone, published Alone Sex Life: For the Days of Solitude (Jap. ひとりぼっちの性生活=孤独に生きる日々のために) by Masami Akiyama (秋山正美). The book described the process of masturbation. At the time, other publishers did not want to publish such literature, however, the book sold well (several tens of thousands of copies were sold out). In the same year, Ito published two more of Akiyama's books, after which the publisher began to receive letters with questions and opinions from readers, mainly homosexual readers.

In 1968, Ito published two new books by Akiyama, aimed at a homosexual audience 30,000 copies of which were sold. However, many customers were embarrassed to buy the book in stores and came directly to the publisher for it.

Ito started to publish materials for homosexual audiences and decided to publish a gay magazine to stand up for people suffering from discrimination and reduce social prejudice against them

The first issue of Barazoku was published on July 30, 1971, and was the first gay magazine in Japan that could be purchased in stores (before that, only self-published magazines were available).

Barazoku was published for 33 years, and remained one of the most popular gay press publications in Japan.

== Personal life ==
In 1958, Ito married Kimiko Kawashima. They have son Fumihito. On January 11, 1970, his wife died at the age of 33 from carbon monoxide poisoning. In October of the same year, Ito married for the second time. He had another son, Fumihisa, by his second wife.
