= Martel Schwichtenberg =

German painter

- portrait of Schwichtenberg by Frieda Riess, 1919
- Born: 5 June 1896; Hanover, Germany
- Died: 31 July 1945 (aged 49); Sulzburg, Germany
- Known for: Painting

Martel Schwichtenberg (5 June 1896 – 31 July 1945) was a German painter.

== Biography ==
Schwichtenberg was born on 5 June 1896 in Hanover, Germany. She studied at the Kunstakademie Düsseldorf (Düsseldorf Art Academy). Schwichtenberg's artistic career began in Hanover with work as an interior designer and packaging designer. She relocated to Berlin around 1920. There she set up a studio and continued working as a designer. She was a member of Werkbund and the Novembergruppe. She painted some portraits of the German avant-garde living in Berlin. In the mid-1930s she moved to South Africa, where she ran a ceramics workshop. The shop was destroyed by fire and Schwichtenberg returned to Germany in 1939.

She died on 31 July 1945 in Sulzburg, Germany.

== Collections ==
Schwichtenberg's work is in the collections of the Los Angeles County Museum of Art, the Museum of Modern Art and the Yale University Art Gallery.

== Gallery ==
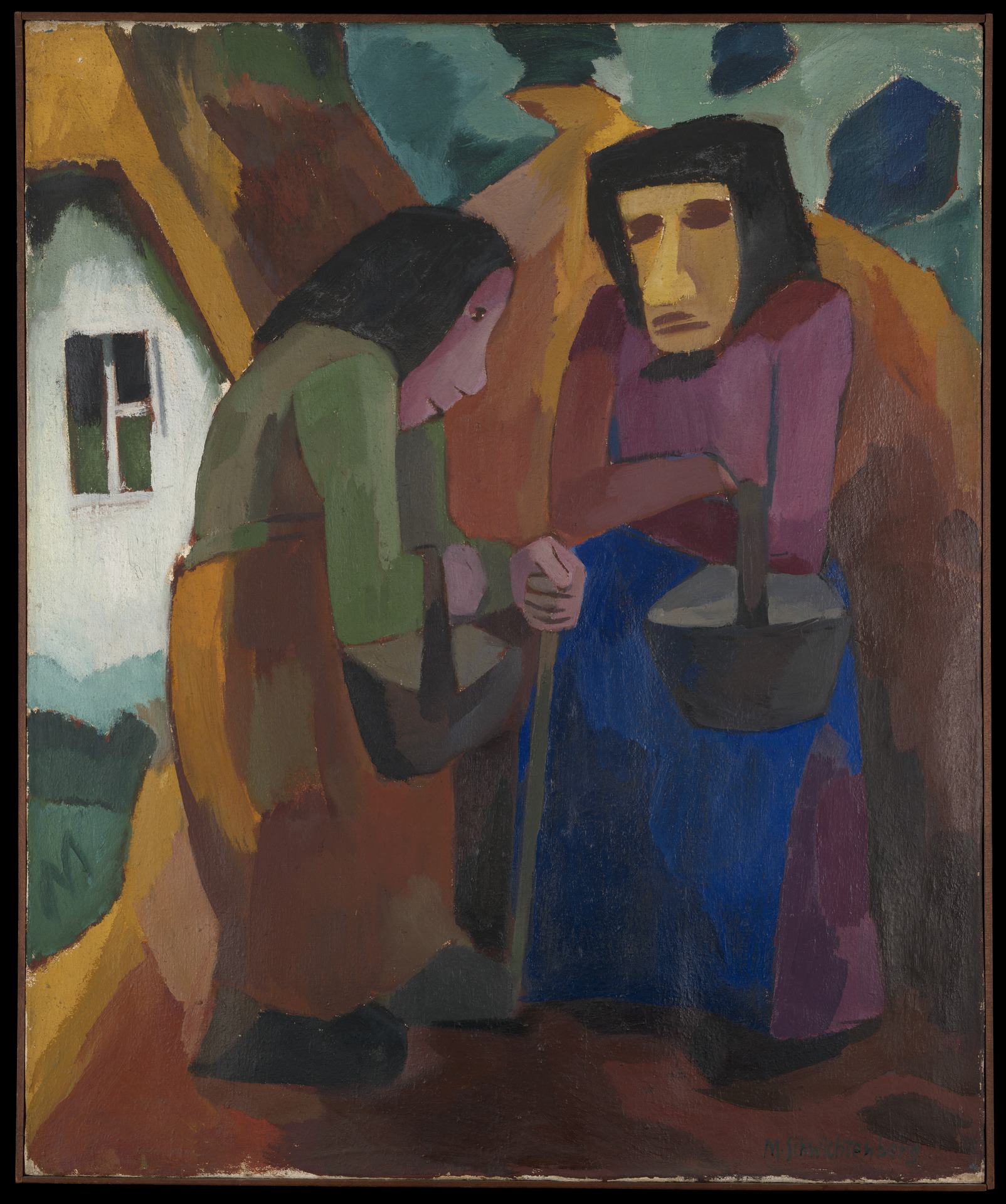
Frauen vor dem Hau, 1921

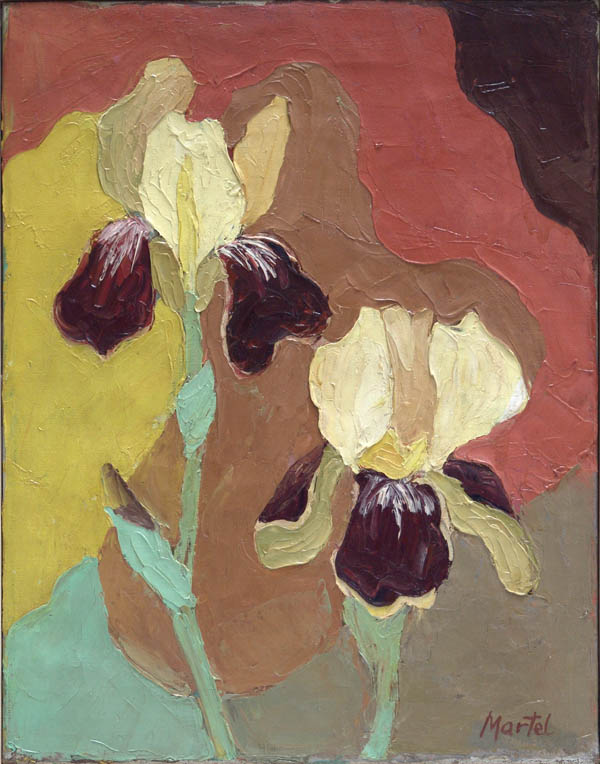
Zwei Schwertlilien
