= Michael Manning (fetish artist) =

American comic book artist, writer and fetish artist

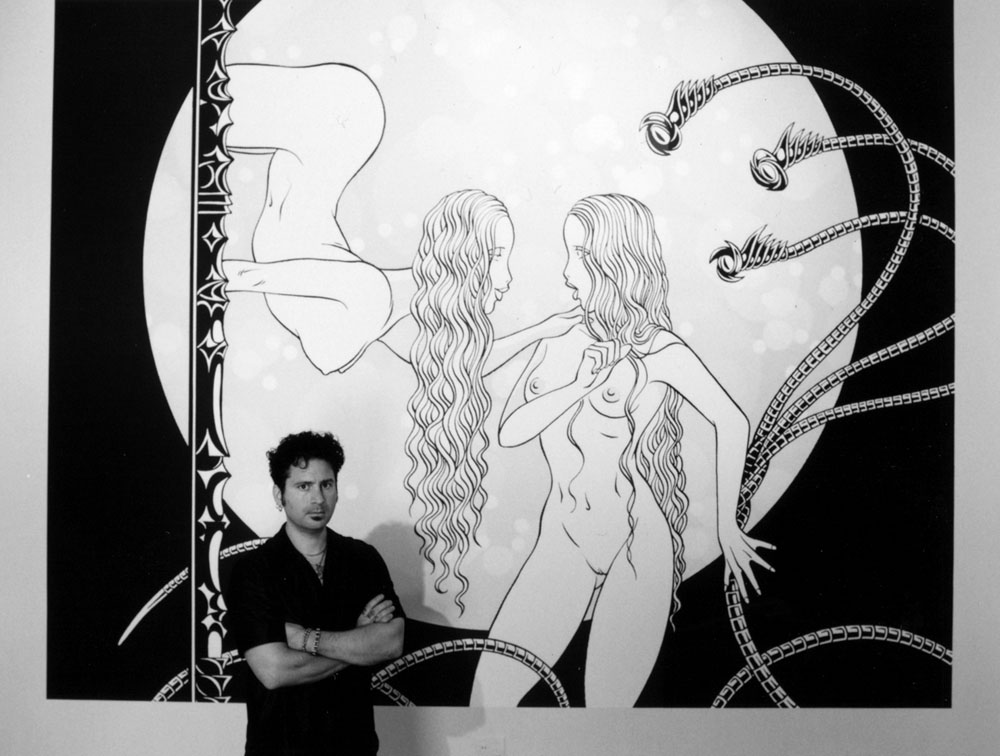
- Michael Manning at Yerba Buena Center for the Arts, San Francisco, CA (2002)
- Born: Michael Manning; 1963 (age 62–63)
- Areas: Writer, Artist

Michael Manning (born 1963) is an American comic book artist and writer, fine art illustrator, and traditionally trained animator currently based in Los Angeles, California. He is best known for his graphic novel series, The Spider Garden and Tranceptor, which combine elements of pan-sexual fetishism and BDSM culture with complex characters in science fiction and fantasy settings. He is also active in the supernatural horror and fantasy genres, drawing adaptations of the work of authors such as H.P. Lovecraft, Edgar Allan Poe, and Alexandre Dumas for the Graphic Classics comics anthology series, as well as illustrating an anachronistic version of the German folk epic, The Nibelungen.

== Biography ==
=== Early career ===
Manning was born in Flushing in the New York City borough of Queens and raised in Beverly, Massachusetts where he exhibited an early interest in drawing and writing. Exposure to Japanese animation, fairy-tale book illustration, American and European comics, and the mythology of many cultures all contributed to the formation of his emerging style.

=== 1980s ===
Manning went on to study film and animation at the School of the Museum of Fine Arts in Boston. He began self-publishing art and comics in 1987 while working at Olive Jar Animation in Brookline, MA as an animator and director of short films, commercials, and music videos. Self-published titles such as Shunga, Ukiyo-X and Z/Xero brought his work to the attention of comic book artists John Bergin and James O'Barr (creator of The Crow) who in turn showed his work to Kevin Eastman of Tundra Publishing. This led to the inclusion of two of Manning's short pieces (one of which was a collaboration with Red Spider White Web author Misha Nogha) in Tundra's Bone Saw anthology - Manning's first professional comics publication.

=== 1990s ===
A move to San Francisco in 1991 coincided with Manning's decision to focus on comic books and erotic illustration full-time. Manning continued to self-publish and produce work for the Bay Area's emerging BDSM/sex-zine community while his artwork and stage/costume design for multi-media performances appeared regularly at local music venues, fetish events, and art galleries. Much of his graphic work from this period was subsequently collected and published in the art collection Lumenagerie (1996) and the anthology Cathexis (1997). He also wrote and drew four volumes of the Spider Garden series and in collaboration with artist Patrick Conlon the first installment of the Tranceptor series.

=== 2000s ===
A second collection, Inamorata: The Erotic Art of Michael Manning with an introduction by Patrick Califia-Rice, was published by Last Gasp in 2005 just after Manning moved to Los Angeles. The second volume in the Tranceptor series, Iron Gauge, was published in 2007.

Manning's artwork has been exhibited in galleries in San Francisco, New York, Chicago, Boston, Omaha, Miami, Los Angeles, Tokyo, and Milan. In 2002, mural-sized reproductions of panels from his In A Metal Web graphic novel were featured as part of a special installation at San Francisco's Yerba Buena Center for the Arts comic book-themed exhibition Fantastic! Comics and the Art of Illusion.

Manning's work appears to illustrate Tales of Gor, a role-playing game based on the works of John Norman, written by James Desborough.

== Publications ==
- Michael Manning, Cathexis, Amerotica, 1997. ISBN 1-56163-174-4.
- Michael Manning, Lumenagerie, Nantier Beall Minoustchine Publishing, 1997. ISBN 1-56163-151-5.
- Michael Manning, Patrick Conlon, Tranceptor: The Way Station (Tranceptor Series), Amerotica, 1998. ISBN 1-56163-211-2.
- Michael Manning, Inamorata, Last Gasp, 2005. ISBN 0-86719-628-9.
- Michael Manning, Patrick Conlon, Tranceptor: Iron Gauge (Tranceptor Series), 2007. ISBN 978-1-56163-519-1
- Michael Manning, Erwin Tschofen, Michael Manning's The Nibelungen, SUM Legio Publishing, 2010. ISBN 978-3-9502635-8-9
- Michael Manning, Erwin Tschofen, Michael Manning's The Nibelungen 1st Edition, SUM Legio Publishing, Jan 2010. ISBN 978-3-9502635-9-6

=== Spider Garden ===
- Michael Manning, The Spider Garden (Spider Garden), Amerotica (NBM Publishing), 1995. ISBN 1-56163-117-5.
- Michael Manning, Hydrophidian (Spider Garden), Amerotica (NBM Publishing), 1997. ISBN 1-56163-167-1.
- Michael Manning, In a Metal Web (Spider Garden), Amerotica, 2003. ISBN 1-56163-356-9.
- Michael Manning, In a Metal Web II (Spider Garden), Amerotica, 2003. ISBN 1-56163-360-7.
- Michael Manning, Il giardino della tela di ragno (Italian version of The Spider Garden), Phoenix Enterprise, 1995/1999, ISBN 888643549-5.

== The Spider Garden Series ==
The Spider Garden graphic novel series, written and drawn by Manning, currently consists of four volumes in the following order: The Spider Garden (1995), Hydrophidian (1996), In A Metal Web (2004), and In A Metal Web II (2004).

=== Publication history ===
The first volume of the Spider Garden series was originally produced under contract for Kevin Eastman's Tundra Publishing line. After Manning was released from his contract with Tundra in 1994, The Spider Garden became the inaugural book in NBM Publishing's Amerotica line with the three subsequent volumes in the series also appearing under the NBM/Amerotica imprint. An Italian language edition of the first volume was published by Phoenix Erotica in 1999, followed by French and Italian language editions from BD Érogéne in 2000.

=== Plot ===
Set in a futuristic, matriarchal world of warring clans which vaguely recalls feudal-era Japanese culture, the action centers on the eponymous Spider Garden, a palace-fortress populated by concubines, human pets, and the spider-like automata who give the Garden its name. The Garden's ruler is Shaalis the Sacred Androgyne, a seemingly immortal hermaphrodite who is referred to by the pronouns 'Hir' and 'S/He' (pronounced as "her" and "she" respectively) to denote Hir multi-gendered status.

The main plot follows the socio-political intrigues between Shaalis' Metal Spider Clan and the Serpentine Sisters, Squamata and Lichurna - incestuous twins who command the rival Water Serpent Clan which is based in an aquatic palace, Hydrophidian. Caught in the middle are former lovers Sasaya Nijan, a female courtesan who enters service in the Spider Garden in order to settle a gambling debt, and Lord Verio, head of the Double Ibis Clan who, following a failed assassination attempt on the Sacred Androgyne, finds himself deposed and forced into an alliance with the Serpentine Sisters.

Also appearing in the story are the Tengu, a non-human race of horse-like bipeds. Inspired by but not identical to the tengu of Japanese legend, it is implied that these creatures once held humanity in bondage in the distant past.
