= Homoeroticism =

Sexual attraction between members of the same sex

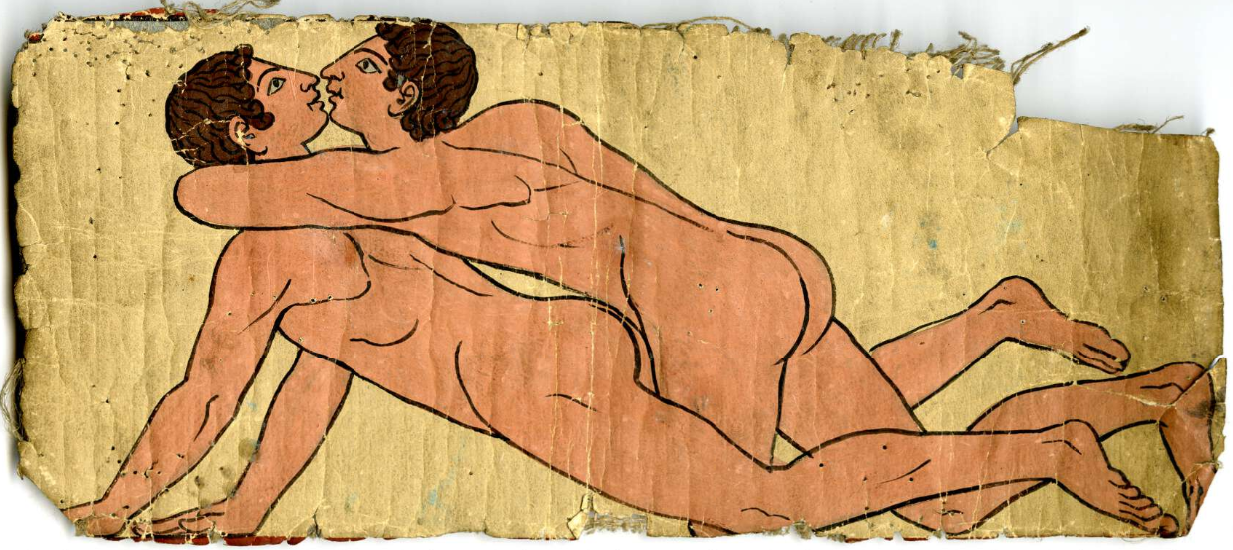
An Etruscan fresco painting depicting two male lovers having sex.

Homoeroticism is sexual attraction between members of the same sex, including both male–male and female–female attraction. The concept differs from the concept of homosexuality: it refers specifically to the desire itself, which can be temporary, whereas "homosexuality" implies a more permanent state of identity or sexual orientation. It has been depicted or manifested throughout the history of the visual arts and literature and can also be found in performative forms; from theatre to the theatricality of uniformed movements (e.g., the Wandervogel and Gemeinschaft der Eigenen). According to the Oxford English Dictionary, it is "pertaining to or characterized by a tendency for erotic emotions to be centered on a person of the same sex; or pertaining to a homo-erotic person."

This is a relatively recent dichotomy that has been studied in the earliest times of ancient poetry to modern drama by modern scholars. Thus, scholars have analyzed the historical context in many homoerotic representations such as classical mythology, Renaissance literature, paintings and vase-paintings of ancient Greece and Ancient Roman pottery.

Though homoeroticism can differ from the interpersonal homoerotic—as a set of artistic and performative traditions, in which such feelings can be embodied in culture and thus expressed into the wider society—some authors have cited the influence of personal experiences in ancient authors such as Catullus, Tibullus and Propertius in their homoerotic poetry.

== Overview and analysis ==
The term "homoerotic" carries with it the weight of modern classifications of love and desire that may not have existed in previous eras. Homosexuality as known today was not fully codified until the mid-20th century, though this process began much earlier:

Following in the tradition of Michel Foucault, scholars such as Eve Kosofsky Sedgwick and David Halperin have argued that various Victorian public discourses, notably the psychiatric and the legal, fostered a designation or invention of the "homosexual" as a distinct category of individuals, a category solidified by the publications of sexologists such as Richard von Krafft-Ebing (1840–1902) and Havelock Ellis (1859–1939), sexologists who provided an almost-pathological interpretation of the phenomenon in rather Essentialist terms, an interpretation that led, before 1910, to hundreds of articles on the subject in The Netherlands, Germany, and elsewhere. One result of this burgeoning discourse was that the "homosexual" was often portrayed as a corrupter of the innocent, with a predisposition towards both depravity and paederasty—a necessary portrayal if Late-Victorian and Edwardian sexologists were to account for the continuing existence of the "paederast" in a world that had suddenly become bountiful in "homosexuals."

Despite an ever-changing and evolving set of modern classifications, members of the same sex often formed intimate associations (many of which were erotic as well as emotional) on their own terms, most notably in the "romantic friendships" documented in the letters and papers of 18th- and 19th-century men and women. These romantic friendships, which may or may not have included genital sex, were characterized by passionate emotional attachments and what modern thinkers would consider homoerotic overtones.

Aesthetic philosopher Thomas Mann argued in a 1925 essay that homoeroticism is aesthetic, while heterosexuality is prosaic.

=== Psychoanalysis ===
Sigmund Freud, the founder of psychoanalysis, held viewpoints on sexual orientation embedded in his psychoanalytic studies on narcissism and the Oedipus complex, where "rather than being a matter only for a minority of men who identify as homosexual or gay, homoeroticism is a part of the very formation of all men as human subjects and social actors." Freud believed humans to be naturally bisexual, however also expressed interest in "the organic determinants of homoeroticism".

== Notable examples in the visual arts ==
=== Male–male ===
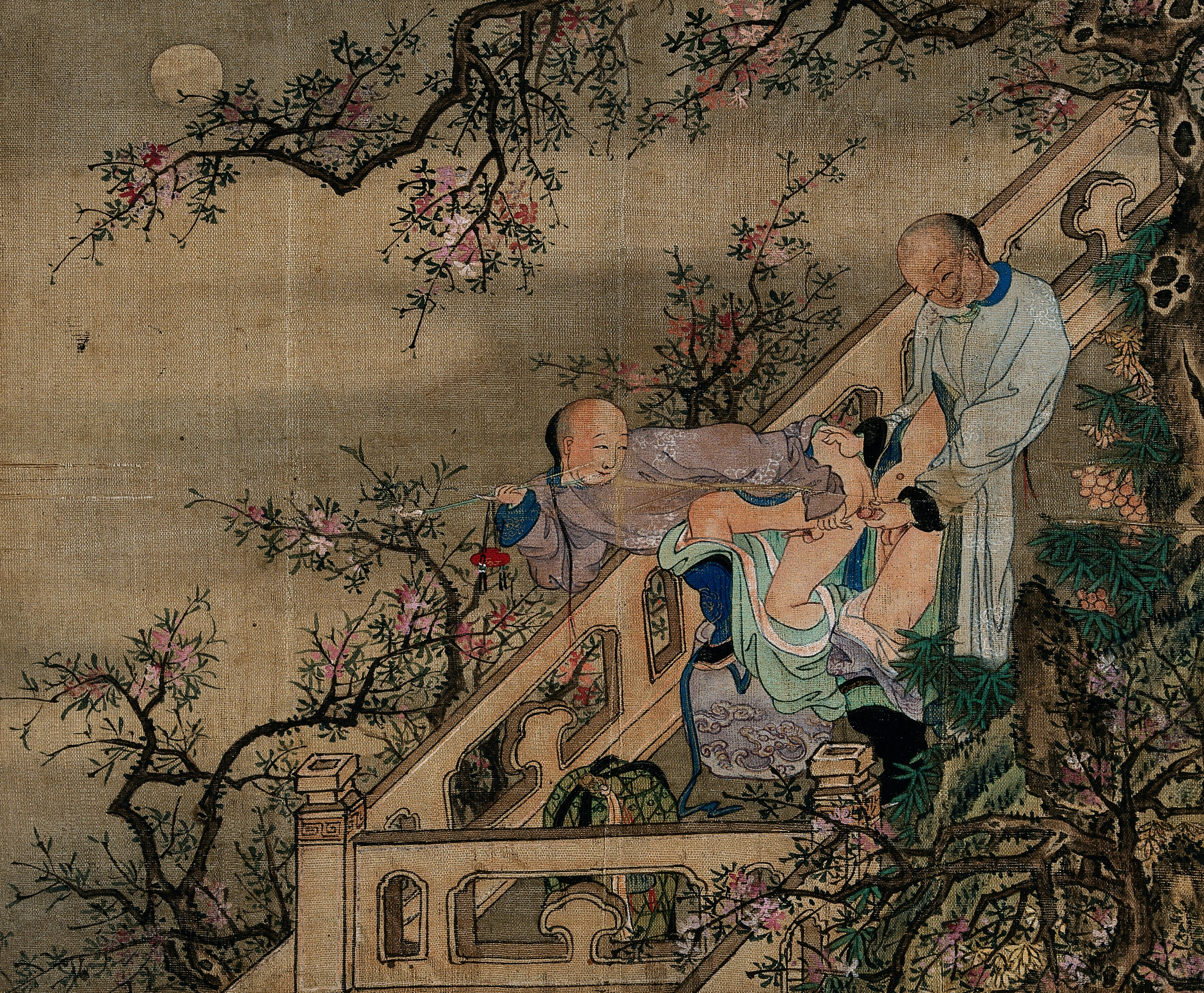
Two young men about to have anal sex, Qing China

Male–male examples, in the visual fine arts, range through history: Ancient Greek vase art; Ancient Roman wine goblets (the Warren Cup). Several Italian Renaissance artists are thought to have been homosexual, and homoerotic appreciation of the male body has been identified by critics in works by Leonardo da Vinci and Michelangelo. More explicit sexual imagery occurring in the Mannerist and Tenebrist styles of the 16th and 17th centuries, especially in artists such as Agnolo Bronzino, Michel Sweerts, Carlo Saraceni and Caravaggio, whose works were sometimes severely criticized by the Catholic Church.

Many 19th century history paintings of classical characters such as Hyacinth, Ganymede and Narcissus can also be interpreted as homoerotic; the work of 19th-century artists (such as Frédéric Bazille, Hippolyte Flandrin, Théodore Géricault, Thomas Eakins, Eugène Jansson, Henry Scott Tuke, Aubrey Beardsley and Magnus Enckell); through to the modern work of fine artists such as Paul Cadmus and Gilbert & George. Fine art photographers such as Karl Hammer, Wilhelm von Gloeden, David Hockney, Will McBride, Robert Mapplethorpe, Pierre et Gilles, Bernard Faucon, Anthony Goicolea have also made a strong contribution, Mapplethorpe and McBride being notably in breaking down barriers of gallery censorship and braving legal challenges. James Bidgood was also an important pioneer in the 1960s, radically moving homoerotic photography away from simple documentary and into areas that were more akin to fine art surrealism.

In Asia, male eroticism also has its roots in traditional Japanese shunga (erotic art), this tradition influenced contemporary Japanese artists, such as Tamotsu Yatō (photography artist), Sadao Hasegawa (painter) and Gengoroh Tagame (manga artist).

=== Female–female ===
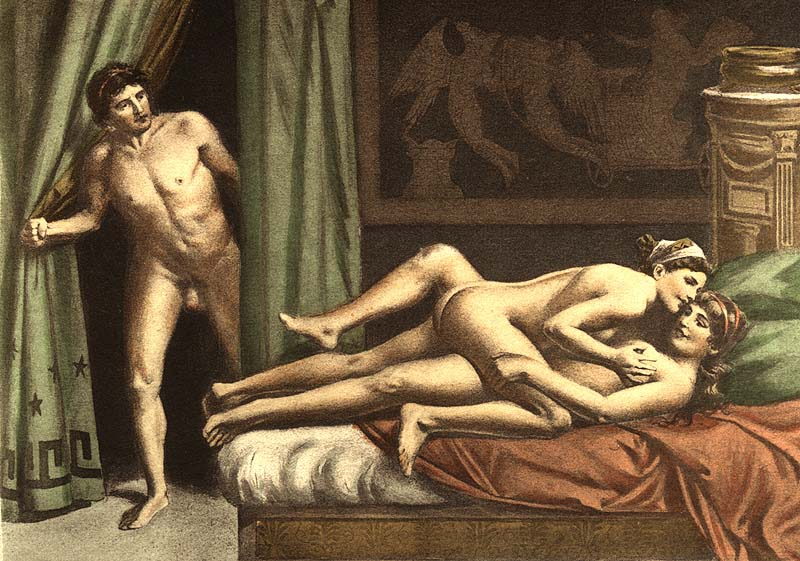
An example of lesbian erotica by Édouard-Henri Avril

Female–female examples are most historically noticeable in the narrative arts: the lyrics of Sappho; The Songs of Bilitis; novels such as those of Christa Winsloe, Colette, Radclyffe Hall, and Jane Rule, and films such as Mädchen in Uniform. More recently, lesbian homoeroticism has flowered in photography and the writing of authors such as Patrick Califia and Jeanette Winterson.

Female homoerotic art by lesbian artists has often been less culturally prominent than the presentation of lesbian eroticism by non-lesbians and for a primarily non-lesbian audience. In the West, this can be seen as long ago as the 1872 novel Carmilla, and is also seen in cinema in such popular films as Emmanuelle, The Hunger, Showgirls, and most of all in pornography. In East and South East Asia, especially Japan, lesbianism is the subject of the manga subgenre yuri.

In many texts in the English-speaking world, lesbians have been presented as intensely sexual but also predatory and dangerous (the characters are often vampires) and the primacy of heterosexuality is usually re-asserted at the story's end. This shows the difference between homoeroticism as a product of the wider culture and homosexual art produced by gay men and women.

== Examples in writing ==
The most prominent example of homoeroticism in the Western canon is that of the sonnets by William Shakespeare. Though certain critics have made assertions, some in efforts to preserve Shakespeare's literary credibility, to them being non-erotic in nature, no critic has disputed that the majority of Shakespeare's sonnets concern explicitly male–male love poetry. The only other Renaissance artist writing in English to do this was the poet Richard Barnfield, who in The Affectionate Shepherd and Cynthia wrote fairly explicitly homoerotic poetry. Barnfield's poems, furthermore, are now widely accepted as a major influence upon Shakespeare's.

The male–male erotic tradition contains poems by major poets such as Abu Nuwas, Walt Whitman, Federico García Lorca, Paul Verlaine, W. H. Auden, Fernando Pessoa and Allen Ginsberg.

Elisar von Kupffer's Lieblingminne und Freundesliebe in der Weltlitteratur (1900) and Edward Carpenter's Ioläus: An Anthology of Friendship (1902) were the first known notable attempts at homoerotic anthologies since The Greek Anthology. Since then, many anthologies have been published.

In the female–female tradition, there are poets such as Sappho, "Michael Field", and Maureen Duffy. Emily Dickinson addressed a number of poems and letters with homoerotic overtones to her sister-in-law Susan Huntington Gilbert.

Letters can also be potent conveyors of homoerotic feelings; the letters between Virginia Woolf and Vita Sackville-West, two well-known members of the Bloomsbury Group, are full of homoerotic overtones characterized by this excerpt from Vita's letter to Virginia: "I am reduced to a thing that wants Virginia [...] It is incredible to me how essential you have become [...] I shan't make you love me any the more by giving myself away like this --But oh my dear, I can't be clever and stand-offish with you: I love you too much for that." (January 21, 1926)

== Examples in music ==
The lines in the 1957 Elvis Presley song Jailhouse Rock "Number 47 said to number 3 'you're cutest jailbird I ever did see. I sure would be delighted with your company. Come on and do the Jailhouse Rock with me.'" are acknowledged to be a reference to homoeroticism.

== Religion ==
While Mainstream Christianity predominately condemns homoeroticism, some theologians and historians have concluded that Jesus of Nazareth had a non-heteronormative behavioral pattern, in some cases based on apocryphal texts. Some also include the apostles John and Simon Peter.

Some speculate that John the Baptist had homosocial or homoerotic behavior. In the Gospel of John (3:22–36), John the Baptist speaks of himself as the “friend of the bridegroom,” implying that the bridegroom of Christ (Matthew 9:15) is coming to meet his bride, though nothing specific to identify the bride. Jesus was a rabbi, a teacher, and all the rabbis at that time were married; there is no reference to a possible marriage.

Some theologians and scholars claim that other Biblical figures engaged in non-heterosexual behavior such as Jacob and David and Jonathan, as well as the canonized saints Francis of Assisi and Saint Sebastian.

== In cinema ==
Positive portrayals of homoerotic feelings in relationships, made at feature length and for theatrical exhibition, and made by those who are same-sex oriented. Successful examples would be: Mädchen in Uniform, Germany (1931); The Leather Boys, UK (1964); Scorpio Rising, U.S. (1964); Death in Venice, Italy (1971); The Naked Civil Servant, UK (1975); Sebastiane, UK (1976); Outrageous!, Canada (1977); My Beautiful Laundrette, UK (1985); Maurice, UK (1987); the Talented Mr. Ripley, US (1999); Summer Vacation 1999, Japan, (1988); Brokeback Mountain, U.S. (2005); Black Swan, U.S. (2010); Carol, UK/U.S. (2015) and most recently Moonlight, U.S. (2016), Call Me by Your Name, U.S./Italy (2017), and Portrait of a Lady on Fire, France (2019). Also of note is the 1990 feature-length BBC adaptation of Oranges Are Not the Only Fruit.

== Key introductory books ==
Classical and medieval literature:

- Murray & Roscoe. Islamic Homosexualities: Culture, History, and Literature (1997)
- J. W. Wright. Homoeroticism in Classical Arabic Literature (1997)
- Rictor Norton. The Homosexual Literary Tradition (1974) (Greek, Roman & Elizabethan England)

Literature after 1850:

- David Leavitt. Pages Passed from Hand to Hand : The Hidden Tradition of Homosexual Literature in English from 1748 to 1914 (1998)
- Timothy d'Arch Smith. Love In Earnest; some notes on the lives and writings of English 'Uranian' poets from 1889 to 1930 (1970)
- Michael Matthew Kaylor, Secreted Desires: The Major Uranians: Hopkins, Pater and Wilde (2006), a 500-page scholarly volume that considers the major Victorian writers of Uranian poetry and prose (the author has made this volume available in a free, open-access, PDF version).
- Mark Lilly. Gay Men's Literature in the Twentieth Century (1993)
- Patricia Juliana Smith. Lesbian Panic: Homoeroticism in Modern British Women's Fiction (1997)
- Gregory Woods. Articulate Flesh – male homoeroticism and modern poetry (1989) (USA poets)
- Vita Sackville-West. Louise DeSalvo, Mitchell A. Leaska, editors. Vita Sackville-West The Letters of Vita Sackville-West to Virginia Woolf (1985)
- Virginia Woolf. Congenial Spirits: The Selected Letters of Virginia Woolf Joanne Trautmann Banks, editor (Harcourt Brace, 1991)
- Joe Dowson. Past Thoughts and Precognition: Eroticism Through My Eyes (Self Published, co-author by D.Cameron, 2013)

Visual arts:

- Jonathan Weinberg. Male Desire: The Homoerotic in American Art (2005)
- James M. Saslow. Pictures and Passions: A History of Homosexuality in the Visual Arts (1999)
- Allen Ellenzweig. The Homoerotic Photograph: Male Images, Delacroix to Mapplethorpe (1992)
- Thomas Waugh. Hard to Imagine: Gay Male Eroticism in Photography and Film from Their Beginnings to Stonewall (1996)
- Emmanuel Cooper. The Sexual Perspective: Homosexuality and Art in the Last 100 Years in the West (1994)
- Claude J. Summers (editor). The Queer Encyclopedia of the Visual Arts (2004)
- Harmony Hammond. Lesbian Art in America: A Contemporary History (2000) (Post-1968 only)
- Laura Doan. Fashioning Sapphism: The Origins of a Modern English Lesbian Culture (2001) (Post-WW I in England)

Performing arts:

- Ramsay Burt. The Male Dancer: Bodies, Spectacle, Sexualities (3rd Revised Edition 2022)

== See also ==
- Bara
- Body theory
- Boys' love
- List of BL dramas
- Erotica
- Sex in advertising
- Shōnen-ai
- Slash fiction
- Uranian poetry
- Yuri

== Bibliography ==
- BURGER, Michael. The Shaping of Western Civilization: From Antiquity to the Enlightenment (University of Toronto Press, 2008), 308 pages. ISBN 1-55111-432-1, ISBN 978-1-55111-432-3
- YOUNGER, John Grimes. Sex in the ancient world from A to Z (Routledge, 2005), 217 pages. ISBN 0-415-24252-5, ISBN 978-0-415-24252-3
- FLOOD, Michael. International encyclopedia of men and masculinities (Routledge, 2007), 704 pages. ISBN 0-415-33343-1, ISBN 978-0-415-33343-6
- HEILBUT, Anthony. Thomas Mann: Eros and Literature (University of California Press, 1997), 638 pages. ISBN 0-520-20911-7, ISBN 978-0-520-20911-4
- KONTJE, Todd Curtis. A companion to German realism, 1848–1900 (Camden House, 2002), 412 pages. ISBN 1-57113-322-4, ISBN 978-1-57113-322-9
- Lewes, Kenneth (1988), The Psychoanalytic Theory of Male Homosexuality, New York: New American Library, ISBN 0-452-01003-9
