= Traci Lords discography =

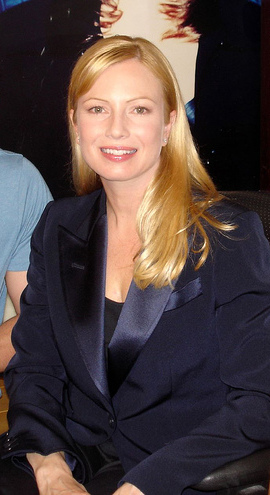
- Traci Lords, 2006
- Studio albums: 1
- EPs: 1
- Compilation albums: 1
- Singles: 4
- Music videos: 4
- Promotional singles: 2

American actress Traci Lords has released one studio album, one extended play, one compilation album, four singles, two promotional singles and four music videos. She began recording her first demo songs in 1989. After singing in the teen musical comedy Cry-Baby (1990), Lords got signed for a development deal with Capitol Records. She was then asked to sing on the song "Little Baby Nothing" from Manic Street Preachers' debut album Generation Terrorists (1992). Lords was later dropped due to disagreements between her and the label and after meeting with American DJ Rodney Bingenheimer at a birthday party, she was recommended to Jeff Jacklin, who hired her to record the song "Love Never Dies" for the 1992 film Pet Sematary Two. The producer of the soundtrack, Gary Kurfirst, signed her for a development deal with his label Radioactive Records.

Her debut single, "Control", was released in 1995. It peaked at number two on the Billboard Hot Dance Club Songs and number eighty-two on the UK Singles Chart. The song also appeared on the soundtrack to the film Mortal Kombat (1995), which was certified double platinum by the Recording Industry Association of America (RIAA). Lords' debut studio album, 1000 Fires (1995) was released shortly after. Despite the favorable reviews and good chart position of the lead single, 1000 Fires did not achieve commercial success. Its second single, "Fallen Angel" also managed to be successful in charts, peaking at eleven on the Billboard Hot Dance Club Songs and number seventy-two on UK Singles Chart. It was featured on the soundtrack to the film Virtuosity (1995).

Lords briefly returned to music in 2003 with the independent release of the song, "Walking in L.A.", and extended play, Sunshine (2004). However, she again decided to focus on her acting career. In 2010, she signed to Sea To Sun Recordings and released "Pretty" as a promotional single. Her single "Last Drag" was released in 2011 and peaked at number four on the Billboard Dance Club Songs chart.

In 2013, Lords released “Stupidville,” an "in your face" social outcry in support of victims of sexual assault and a “direct reaction” to the 2012 Steubenville High School rape case. In her 2003 autobiography, Underneath It All, Lords wrote that she was raped at age 10 in Steubenville by a 16-year-old boy. Lords co-wrote and sang “Stupidville” because she “felt compelled to speak out through the power of music, in order to reflect her own experience and give a voice to the ‘Jane Doe's’ of the world.” According to Sea to Sun,

“The raw intensity of the production on both the song and the video arose naturally from the need to call attention to the impending trial. With no time to waste, Traci and the Sea to Sun team wrote and recorded the song in less than a week. The video, which draws from Traci Lords' self-produced and directed short film Sweet Pea as well as current event footage and a PSA from Anonymous, was produced in less than 48 hours by Reality Engine Studios (Matyas Kelemen & Mikhail Gervits), and Chris Banuchi.”

Following Stupidville's release, Lords gave multiple interviews criticizing her hometown and its “thickness.” However, five years later, Lords (under her married name, Gruenewald) bought residential property five miles northeast of Steubenville, in the neighboring city of Weirton, West Virginia.

== Albums ==
=== Studio albums ===
Title	Album details
1000 Fires	Released: February 28, 1995; Label: Radioactive; Formats: CD

=== Extended plays ===
Title	Album details
Sunshine	Released: October 11, 2004; Label: Self-released; Format: CD, digital download

=== Compilation albums ===
Title	Album details
M2F2	Released: September 18, 2012; Label: Sea to Sun; Format: Digital download

== Singles ==
=== As lead artist ===
Title	Year	Peak chart positions		Album
Title	Year	UK	US Dance	Album
"Control"	1994	81	2	1000 Fires
"Fallen Angel"	1995	72	11	1000 Fires
"Last Drag"	2011	—	4	Non-album single
"Come Alive"	2018	—	—	Non-album single

=== Promotional singles ===
Title	Year
"Walking in L.A."	2003
"Pretty"	2009

== Other charted songs ==
Title	Year	Peak chart positions	Album
Title	Year	US Dance	Album
"He's My Bitch"	2012	25	M2F2

== Music videos ==
Title	Year	Director(s)
"Control"	1994	Graeme Joyce
"Fallen Angel"	1995	Stéphane Sednaoui
"Walking In L.A."	2003	Mike Ruiz
"Last Drag"	2011	Zalman King
