= Single cell =

Single cell may refer to:

== Biology ==
- Single-cell organism
- Single-cell protein
- Single-cell recording, a neuro-electric monitoring technique
- Single-cell sequencing
  - Single cell epigenomics
- Single-cell transcriptomics, a technique in molecular biology

== Other uses ==
- Single-cell thunderstorm, a pulse storm
- Single Cell (comic), a 2001 story in Star Wars Tales
- Single Cell Orchestra, the performing name of Miguel Fierro
- Single Cell Orchestra (album), a 1996 music album
- An electric battery of one cell
- Single-celling, separation of prison inmates
