= Last Drag =

Single by Traci Lords
- Released: October 25, 2011
- Recorded: 2011; South Beach Studios, Miami
- Genre: Pop rock
- Length: 3:17
- Label: Sea To Sun
- Songwriters: Anton Bass; Sylvia Tosun; Tom Lord-Alge
- Producers: Anton Bass; Konrad Carelli

Traci Lords singles chronology
"Fallen Angel" (1995)	"Last Drag" (2011)	"He's My Bitch" (2012)

"Last Drag" is a song recorded by American actress and singer Traci Lords. Her first musical release since her 2004 EP Sunshine, it was released by Sea To Sun Recordings on October 25, 2011. The Andre Jetson remix of the song was featured on the compilation Traci Lords Presents: M2F2 (2012). The song was written by Anton Bass, Sylvia Tosun and Tom Lord-Alge. Produced by Anton Bass and Konrad Carelli, "Last Drag" is a pop rock song. Its lyrical content is about cravings and temptations that lead one down the wrong path.

The song received positive reviews from music critics. In the United States, it failed to enter the Billboard Hot 100. However, it managed to be successful on the Billboard Dance Club Songs chart, peaking at number four.

The accompanying music video for "Last Drag" was directed by Zalman King, being one of his last projects before his death. It takes place in a nightclub where Lords is surrounded by her "temptations" – alcohol, cigarettes, and ex-lovers. The main inspiration for the video was Studio 54.

== Composition ==
"Last Drag" was written by Anton Bass, Sylvia Tosun and Tom Lord-Alge. Musically, it is a pop rock. Its lyrics use smoking as a metaphor for cravings and temptations that lead one down the wrong path. "It is not meant to be an anti smoking thing at all. It was really a metaphor. The lyrics are "You are my last drag." It is about being addicted to something that you love, you have to do it one more time."

== Music video ==
The accompanying music video for "Last Drag" was directed by Zalman King. It is set in a nightclub where Lords is surrounded by her "temptations". "The whole idea of the video is to walk into a den of my temptations and sins. To see them whether it was girls or whatever. It was meant to go together and flirt with that. People have asked me a lot about it because they consider it very bi-curious."

== Track listings and formats ==
- Digital download
1. "Last Drag" (TLA Mix / Bass & Carelli Original) – 3:17
- Dance Radio Remixes
1. "Last Drag" (The House Rejects Radio Edit) – 3:45
2. "Last Drag" (Sted-E & Hybrid Heights Radio Edit) – 3:03
3. "Last Drag" (Razor N Guido Radio Edit) – 4:10
- CDr Maxi-Single
1. "Last Drag" (TLA Mix / Bass & Carelli Original) – 3:18
2. "Last Drag" (Sted-E & Hybrid Heights Radio Edit) – 3:04
3. "Last Drag" (The House Rejects Radio Edit) – 3:45
4. "Last Drag" (Razor N Guido Radio Edit) – 4:11
5. "Last Drag" (Taurus & Vaggeli Remix) – 7:00
6. "Last Drag" (Sted-E & Hybrid Heights Club Mix) – 5:58
7. "Last Drag" (The House Rejects Club Mix) – 6:10
8. "Last Drag" (Razor N Guido Club Mix) – 8:14
9. "Last Drag" (Alex M.O.R.P.H. Remix) – 7:26
10. "Last Drag" (Sted-E & Hybrid Heights Dub) – 5:18
11. "Last Drag" (Razor N Guido Dub) – 5:47

== Credits and personnel ==
- Traci Lords – lead vocals
- Anton Bass – songwriter, producer
- Sylvia Tosun – songwriter, background vocals
- Tom Lord-Alge – songwriter, executive producer, mix engineer
- Konrad Carelli – producer
- Steve Hass – drums
- Scott Zant – guitars
- Joe LaPorta – mastering
- C42D Creative – graphic design
- Meeno Peluce – photography
- The Blonds – stylists

Credits adapted from Last Drag CDr maxi-single.

== Charts ==
Chart (2011)	Peak position
US Billboard Dance Club Songs	4
