= Federal Medical Center, Fort Worth =

Medical prison in Texas, US

Coordinates: 32°40′47″N 97°17′15″W

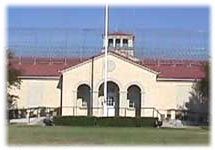
- Interactive map of Federal Medical Center, Fort Worth
- Location: Fort Worth, Tarrant County, Texas
- Status: Operational
- Security class: Administrative Security
- Population: 1,500
- Opened: 1971
- Managed by: Federal Bureau of Prisons
- Warden: Katina Heckard

The Federal Medical Center (FMC) Fort Worth is an administrative-security United States federal prison in Fort Worth, Texas, for male inmates of all security levels with special medical and mental health needs. It is operated by the Federal Bureau of Prisons, a division of the United States Department of Justice.

Originally opening as a Federal Correctional Institution in 1971, the institution was converted to a Federal Medical Center in 1994. At the end of 2006, FMC Fort Worth was returned to FCI status. As of 2017, FMC Fort Worth was again converted back to a Federal Medical Center.

== Notable incidents ==
In February 2012, Michele O'Neal, a correctional officer at the facility, resigned after being charged with sexual abuse of a ward for engaging in a consensual sexual relationship with an inmate at the facility, whom the Federal Bureau of Prisons did not identify. O'Neal pleaded guilty in July, was assigned inmate number 44097-177, and was released in April 2013.

In October 2012, inmate Phillip Monroe Ballard, 71, was charged with soliciting the murder-for-hire of U.S. District Judge John McBryde from FCI Fort Worth. The indictment alleges that Ballard, who was scheduled to go on trial for tax charges before Judge McBryde, approached another inmate about killing Judge McBryde because Ballard believed that McBryde would sentence him to 20 years in prison. The inmate reported Ballard's statement to prison officials and began working as a confidential source for the FBI. The inmate told Ballard that he knew a man on the outside who would do it, upon which Ballard offered to pay the inmate $100,000 in cash and provided him with detailed instructions, such as how it could be done with a high-powered rifle and scope, and even provided a contingency plan of planting a bomb in the judge's vehicle to the inmate. The inmate gave Ballard a handwritten letter from an undercover agent posing as the "killer", which included contact information and notice that the "work" would be completed upon receipt of $5,000. Ballard called the undercover agent four times on September 26, 2012, and the following day, Ballard directed that the $5,000 payment be sent to the address provided by the undercover agent. On March 17, 2014, Ballard was sentenced to 20 years imprisonment.

== Notable inmates (current and former) ==
- † Inmates in the Federal Witness Protection Program are not listed on the Federal Bureau of Prisons website.

=== Terrorists ===
Inmate name	Register Number	Status	Details
Michael Fortier	Unlisted†	Released into the Federal Witness Protection Program in 2006.	Accomplice in the 1995 Oklahoma City bombing; testified against co-conspirators Timothy McVeigh and Terry Nichols; held at FCI Fort Worth during court proceedings.
Stanley Phanor	64959-004	Released from custody on August 5, 2022.	Member of the Universal Divine Saviors religious cult; convicted of providing material support for terrorism in 2009 for his role in a foiled plot to bomb the Sears Tower in Chicago. Four co-conspirators were also convicted.

=== Organized crime figures ===
Inmate name	Register Number	Photo	Status	Details
Paul Vario	16522-053		Died in 1988 while serving a 10-year sentence.	Capo in the Lucchese crime family in New York City; convicted of extortion in 1984. Vario was portrayed by actor Paul Sorvino in the 1990 movie Goodfellas.
Vincent Gigante	26071-037		Died in 2005 while serving a 12-year sentence.	Boss of the Genovese crime family from 1981 to 2005; feigned mental illness for decades to camouflage his position; convicted in 1997 of conspiracy to commit murder and racketeering.
Salvatore Merlino	04172-016		Died in 2012 while serving a 45-year sentence.	Underboss for Philadelphia crime family leader Nicodemo Scarfo during the 1980s; convicted of racketeering in 1988.

=== Corrupt public officials ===
Inmate name	Register Number	Photo	Status	Details
Mario Biaggi	23168-053		Released in June 1991; served 26 months.	Convicted for his role in the Wedtech scandal.
Gil Dozier	01326-095		Released from custody in 1986 after his sentence was commuted by President Ronald Reagan; served 4 years.	Louisiana Commissioner of Agriculture from 1976 to 1980; convicted of extortion and racketeering for demanding $90,000 from Louisiana businesses in exchange for receiving favorable treatment from the state.
Gaston Gerald	01446-095		Released from custody in 1982; served 30 months.	Former Louisiana State Senator; convicted of attempted extortion for demanding $25,000 from a construction contractor in exchange for helping the contractor avoid financial penalties; expelled from the State Senate in 1981.
James McDougal	18525-009		Died in 1998 while serving a 3-year sentence.	Financial partner with Bill Clinton and Hillary Clinton in land dealings which were the subject of the Whitewater political scandal; convicted in 1997 of fraud and conspiracy.
Peter MacDonald	08986-055		Released from custody in 1997 after serving 5 years.	Chairman of the Navajo Nation from 1970 to 1989; convicted in 1992 of conspiracy and burglary for inciting his supporters to riot after he was suspended for corruption, leading to the deaths of two protesters.
Jason R. Smith	59089-019		Served a 10-year sentence; released from custody on August 17, 2016.	Former Atlanta Police officer; pleaded guilty in 2007 to civil rights violations in connection with the death of 92-year-old Kathryn Johnston, who was shot by officers enforcing a search warrant which they obtained based on false information.
Andrew Spengler	08587-089		Served a 15-year sentence; released from custody on November 27, 2020.	Former Milwaukee police officer; convicted in 2007 of civil rights violations in connection with the 2004 knifepoint beating of Frank Jude Jr.; known as the worst incident of police brutality in the city's history.
Steve Stockman	23502-479		Served 2 years of a 10-year sentence; sentence commuted by President Donald Trump in 2020.	Former Republican Congressman from Texas, convicted in 2018 on 23 counts including mail fraud, wire fraud, making false statements to the Federal Election Commission, filing a false tax return, and money laundering.
Leland Yee	19629-111		Served 4 years of a 5-year sentence; released from custody on June 26, 2020.	Former Democratic California State Senator and gun control advocate; convicted in 2016 of charges relating to public corruption and gun trafficking.

=== Others ===
Inmate name	Register Number	Photo	Status	Details
Rubin Gottesman	88085-012		Released from custody in 1997; served 1 year.	Owner of X-Citement Video, a pornographic film company; convicted in 1994 of trafficking in child pornography in connection with an explicit film featuring an underage Traci Lords.
Bernard Ebbers	56022-054		Sentenced to 25 years; released after 13 years on compassionate grounds and died about a month later.	Former CEO of telecommunications company WorldCom. Ebbers was convicted of orchestrating the $11 billion accounting fraud that collapsed WorldCom, the largest corporate fraud case in U.S. history at the time.
Eric Kay	04401-509		Transferred to FCI Englewood. Serving a 22-year sentence; scheduled for release on January 8, 2041.	Former communications director for the Los Angeles Angels of Major League Baseball; convicted of distributing fentanyl and causing the drug-related death of Angels pitcher Tyler Skaggs on July 1, 2019. Kay was sentenced to 22 years in prison on October 11, 2022.
Joseph Maldonado-Passage ("Joe Exotic")	26154-017		Transferred to FMC Lexington. Serving a 21-year sentence; scheduled for release on April 28, 2036.	Zoo operator and country musician; convicted of 8 Lacey Act violations, 8 Endangered Species Act violations, and 2 counts of murder-for-hire after plotting to kill Carole Baskin, chief executive officer of an animal rescue organization. Subject of the TV documentary miniseries Tiger King: Murder, Mayhem and Madness.
Chris Kirchner	44239-510		Transferred to FCI Leavenworth. Serving a 20-year sentence; scheduled for release on July 17, 2040.	Former CEO of supply-chain management software startup Slync; convicted of wire fraud after defrauding investors of tens of millions of dollars, which he spent on luxury items including a private jet.
Jacques Roy	44132-177		Serving a 35-year sentence; scheduled for release on December 25, 2040.	Physician; indicted in 2012 for conspiracy to commit healthcare fraud for allegedly masterminding the largest healthcare fraud in US history, which involved 11,000 patients and resulted in $375 million being fraudulently billed to Medicare and Medicaid.
Nicholas Roske	05098-510		Serving a 97-month sentence; scheduled for release on April 28, 2029.	Traveled to the home of Supreme Court Justice Brett Kavanaugh with the intent to assassinate him. Listed under her birth name of Nicholas John Roske.
Josh Duggar	42501-509		Transferred to FCI Elkton. Serving a 12-year sentence; scheduled for release on February 2, 2033.	Former lobbyist and reality television personality from the TLC series 19 Kids and Counting. He was found guilty of receiving and possessing child sexual abuse materials, and sentenced for receipt of said materials.

== See also ==
- List of United States federal prisons
- Federal Bureau of Prisons
- Incarceration in the United States
