= Enit =

ENIT or Enit may refer to:

- Anit, an Egyptian goddess
- ENIT, Ente Nazionale Italiano per il Turismo, the Italian national tourist board
- École nationale d'ingénieurs de Tarbes, a French engineering university
- Enit Festival, a one-night electronic music festival created by Perry Farrell in 1995
