= Sunshine (EP) =

EP by Traci Lords
- Released: October 11, 2004
- Recorded: 2003
- Genres: Indie rock; techno
- Length: 6:55
- Label: Self-released
- Producers: Traci Lords (exec.); Nick Nolan

Traci Lords chronology
| 1000 Fires (1995) | Sunshine (2004) |

Sunshine is an EP by American singer and actress Traci Lords. It was released independently on October 11, 2004 via online music store CD Baby and autographed CDs were also available on Lords's official website. Sunshine was her first musical release in almost a decade since her debut album 1000 Fires (1995).

Produced by Nick Nolan, the EP contains two tracks: "Sunshine" and "You Burn Inside of Me".

== Background ==
After the release of her debut studio album, 1000 Fires (1995), Lords began working on her second album for Radioactive Records. However, she later left the label to focus on her acting career. "Radioactive was really good to me, but there was a lot of stuff in the mid '90s that was going on with the record industry. I was just so disgusted. I thought 'This is even worse than the film business. I wanted to grow as an artist and I felt like I was being squashed into a box. It wasn't really what I wanted to do, so I said 'Screw it', started really working on my acting career and kind of left it alone."

== Track listing ==
| No. | Title | Writer(s) | Length |
|---|---|---|---|
| 1. | "Sunshine" | Traci Lords; Nick Nolan | 3:07 |
| 2. | "You Burn Inside of Me" | Lords; Nolan | 3:48 |
| Total length: | | | 6:55 |
