= Single Cell Orchestra (album) =

Studio album by Single Cell Orchestra
- Released: March 26, 1996
- Recorded: 1992–1996
- Genre: Ambient, Downtempo
- Length: 68:31
- Label: Asphodel Records

Single Cell Orchestra chronology
Dead Vent 7 (1995)	Single Cell Orchestra (1996)

Professional ratings
Review scores
Source	Rating
Allmusic	3/5 stars

Single Cell Orchestra is the self-titled second album of Single Cell Orchestra released in 1996.

== Track listing ==
1. "A Better Place" – 7:08
2. "Start" – 5:44
3. "Letters From Nowhere" – 5:08
4. "Knockout Drops (200 Proof Mix)" – 8:15
5. "Divinity" – 5:20
6. "Kudowbuz" – 5:30
7. "The Slenderest of Threads" – 7:01
8. "Transmit Liberation" – 9:45
9. "Flight 2127" – 10:17
10. "Freefall" – 4:21
