= Felisha Cooper =

American actress

- Occupation: Actress
- Website: www.felishacooper.webs.com

Felisha Cooper is an American actress. She is known for her role as Sasha Thompson on The Bold and the Beautiful.

== Career ==
With her first known television appearance being as a contestant on Celebrity Name Game, Cooper was discovered by manager Elaine Lively just three weeks after moving to Los Angeles, California. She landed her first film role playing head cheerleader Alexis "Lexi" Andersen in the horror-comedy film All Cheerleaders Die. She also had a prominent role on Criminal Minds as Laurie Patterson in the show's ninth season, episode 11, "Bully." Viaplay produced a TV show Swedish Dicks with Peter Stormare and with Cooper in a bi-role.

== Awards and nominations ==
List of acting awards and nominations
Year	Award	Category	Title	Result	Ref.
2018	Soap Awards France	Best New Character	The Bold and the Beautiful	Nominated	
