= Swedish Dicks =

American-Swedish comedy television series

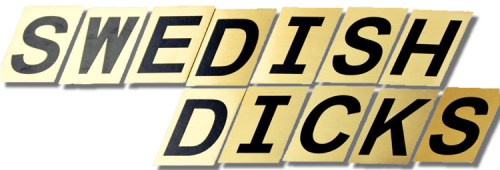
- Genre: Comedy
- Created by: Peter Stormare; Glenn Lund; Peter Settman; Andrew Lowery
- Directed by: Jon Holmberg; Peter Settman
- Starring: Peter Stormare; Johan Glans; Vivian Bang; Felisha Cooper; Keanu Reeves; Traci Lords
- Composers: Anders Niska; Klas Wahl
- Countries of origin: Sweden; United States
- Original languages: English; Swedish
- No. of seasons: 2
- No. of episodes: 20

Production
- Executive producers: Peter Settman; Glenn Lund; Fredrik Ljungberg; Andrew Lowery
- Production location: Los Angeles, California
- Cinematography: Pål Bugge Haagenrud; Hallgrim Haug
- Running time: 25 minutes
- Production companies: Brain Academy; Viking Brothers Entertainment

Original release
- Network: Viaplay (Sweden); Pop (U.S.)
- Release: September 2, 2016 – January 21, 2018

Swedish Dicks is a comedy web television series created by Peter Stormare, Glenn Lund, Peter Settman, and Andrew Lowery. The plot follows two unlicensed Swedish private investigators trying to make a living in Los Angeles. It was premiered on September 2, 2016, on the Swedish online streaming service Viaplay. In the United States, the series began on the Pop television network on August 9, 2017, as well as being distributed worldwide by the American company Lionsgate Television. In October 2016, the series was renewed for a second season which began on December 25, 2017, in northern Europe, and in 2018 in the United States.

== Premise ==
A former stuntman, Ingmar Andersson (Stormare), works as a private investigator in Los Angeles. His life crosses paths with the struggling DJ Axel Kruse (Johan Glans). After giving up his DJ career, he decides to join Ingmar and becomes a partner of his detective firm "Swedish Dick" (now "Swedish Dicks"). Together, they solve various cases, as well as compete with Ingmar's long-time rival and owner of the best investigating company in Los Angeles, Jane McKinney (Traci Lords). Axel is also trying to discover Ingmar's past and the circumstances of his retirement from stunt performing.

== Production ==
Stormare came up with the concept for Swedish Dicks in 2014. He began writing the script for what was intended to be a one-hour drama. When he showed the script to Settman, he suggested that it would be better as a series. Stormare was inspired by his real-life friends, one ex-military and the other an ex-stuntman, who really did become private investigators.

=== Casting ===
The series was announced in November 2015 with Stormare and Glans confirmed for the cast. In March 2016, it was announced that Keanu Reeves and Traci Lords had joined the show. Stormare confirmed that he wrote the part of Jane McKinney with Lords in mind: "I had never met her, but whenever I saw her in a photo or anything, I just felt a connection to that face. And then she had written a book that is fantastic, about her survival, and how that girl survived is a miracle. So it was like a voice within me when I was writing, saying, 'You have to get Traci Lords, Traci Lords, Traci Lords.' Like she was channeling me." Lords described Jane as "the kind of a woman who likes to play with men and use her femininity. At the same time, she believes that she definitely has the biggest dick in the room."

== Cast ==
- Peter Stormare as Ingmar Andersson
- Johan Glans as Axel Kruse, Axel Magnus Enström
- Vivian Bang as Sun
- Felisha Cooper as Sarah Andersson
- Keanu Reeves as Tex Johnson
- Traci Lords as Jane McKinney
- Stephanie Koenig as Eve

== Episodes ==
=== Season 1 (2016) ===
No. overall	No. in season	Title	Directed by	Written by	Original release date	US viewers (thousands)
1	1	"When Ingmar Met Axel"	Peter Settman	Andrew Lowery	September 2, 2016	127
Ingmar (Stormare) is a former stuntman who works as a private investigator in Los Angeles. He is in danger of losing his detective business if he does not pay off his debt. After he fails to solve his last case, he is hired by Theodore (Brando Eaton), a young DJ who offers Ingmar $8,000 to find his stolen laptop. He is led to a once famous DJ named Axel (Glans). After the two spend a night at a bar, Ingmar steals the laptop from the drunk Axel's hotel room and returns it to Theodore. However, he soon finds out that Theodore is a bartender who was hired by a club owner, Tony (Julio Oscar Mechoso), to steal Axel's music.
2	2	"The Blind Leading the Blind"	Peter Settman	Andrew Lowery	September 2, 2016	87
After becoming detective partners, Ingmar takes his new colleague Axel to a shooting range where they encounter Ingmar's enemy and founder of the best investigating company in Los Angeles, Jane McKinney (Lords). Ingmar bets Jane that he can make Axel shoot better than one of her guys in one week. Meanwhile, the "dicks" are hired by a blind man, Jeff, to find out if his wife is having an affair. Axel is introduced to Ingmar's daughter Sarah (Felisha Cooper).
3	3	"The Very Brief Adventures of Maintenance Guy and Plant Man"	Peter Settman	Andrew Lowery	September 9, 2016	110
An owner of an advertising agency, Dan (Josh Daugherty), has a suspicion that someone has been stealing and selling his company's ideas. The investigation is complicated after the agency's owner commits suicide.
4	4	"Let's Talk About Cults"	Jon Holmberg	Andrew Lowery	September 9, 2016	71
Ingmar is haunted by a ghost of his old friend and stunt partner Tex (Reeves). A female couple (Musetta Vander and Laney Fichera) hire the "dicks" to find their missing daughter, Rachel (Ashley St. George), who joined a cult. Axel finds the cult leader Sam (Taylor Nichols) and pretends he wants to join.
5	5	"Howl Like a Big Dog"	Jon Holmberg	Andrew Lowery	September 16, 2016	102
A young female porn star, Taylor Slow (Jane Levy), hires the "dicks" to catch her stalker. Axel is trying to infiltrate Jane's detective company.
6	6	"Tale of the Tape"	Jon Holmberg	Andrew Lowery	September 23, 2016	129
Axel decides to stop taking his antidepressants without his therapist's approval, which leads to him suffering from its side effects. With Ingmar, they find the cameraman who they believe had been shooting behind-the-scenes footage on the set of Blood Curse 2. He is willing to give them a copy of the footage o one condition: they kill him. Meanwhile, Anne, owner of a pet cemetery, reaches out to the "dicks" to help her convict her competitor Carl of unethically cremating animals in large groups, instead of individually as he claims. After they arrive late to their appointment, they are suggested to find an assistant. On their way to the office, they run over a dog that survives. They bring the dog to the cameraman who agrees to exchange it for the tape. On the tape they find out that Tex had been having an affair with a girlfriend of a Russian mobster Dimitri. When they finally force Oscar to make a video confession, Anne decides to make him her business partner instead of turning him in to the police.
7	7	"The Curse of the North Korean Curse"	Jon Holmberg	Andrew Lowery	September 30, 2016	N/A
Ingmar finds a way to get a large amount of money, so that he can buy a car from the man he suspects killed his friend Tex. Meanwhile, Axel tries to make friends in Los Angeles and ends up hanging out with Ingmar's daughter, Sarah.
8	8	"Back to School"	Peter Settman	Andrew Lowery	October 7, 2016	96
Ingmar tries to arrange a meeting with Dimitri (Carlo Rota), a Russian Mafia boss who sells stolen cars, who he suspects killed his friend Tex a couple of years earlier. Meanwhile, Axel is hired to solve a case of cyberbullying.
9	9	"There’s Something About Tex"	Jon Holmberg	Andrew Lowery	October 14, 2016	89
Ingmar and Axel are hired by an Australian sheep farmer, Jack (Anthony LaPaglia), his daughter Sheila (Katherine Wallace) and son (Josh Harp), to recover their stolen ram named Russell Crowe.
10	10	"See You Later, Alligator"	Jon Holmberg	Andrew Lowery	October 14, 2016	N/A

=== Season 2 (2017) ===
No. overall	No. in season	Title	Directed by	Written by	Original release date	US viewers (thousands)
11	1	"A Thief Among Us"	Peter Settman	Per Gavatin	December 25, 2017	N/A
Ingmar wants the dicks to become legitimate and apply for private investigator licenses, but that creates unexpected immigration trouble for Axel. Meanwhile, Elvis (Joe Hursley), Robin Hood (Joe Sofranko), French tourist Jean (Terence Leclere) and Frankenstein's monster ask them to catch a thief on Hollywood Boulevard.
12	2	"Dial M for Medium"	Peter Settman	Chris Hazzard & Michael Fontana	December 25, 2017	N/A
When Sarah introduces her yoga class friend Eve (Stephanie Koenig) to the dicks, Axel is smitten; but he is trying to keep it "strictly" professional, at least until they solve the case involving Eve, her mother and a medium.
13	3	"It Had to Be Lou"	Peter Settman	Tim Meltreger	January 1, 2018	55
The dicks meet a mystery client in prison asking them to help his friend who has been framed for a murder he did not commit. At the same time, Sun helps Axel with his little visa problem, through the funeral director Lou.
14	4	"Floyd Cal Who"	Peter Settman	Tim Meltreger	January 1, 2018	55
When the founder of a dating app realizes that his app is finally making traction, he asks the dicks to help him find and stop the hit man he hired to kill himself when he had hit rock bottom.
15	5	"Two Dicks Walk Into a Bar"	Andreas Lindergard	Chris Hazzard & Michael Fontana	January 8, 2018	79
16	6	"Behind Bars"	Peter Settman	Per Gavatin	January 8, 2018	64
17	7	"Dawn of the Dicks"	Andreas Lindergard	Tim Meltreger	January 14, 2018	74
18	8	"The Swedish FBI"	Peter Settman	Per Gavatin	January 14, 2018	47
19	9	"Girls Day!"	Peter Stormare	Chris Hazzard & Michael Fontana	January 21, 2018	67
20	10	"Till Dicks Do Us Part"	Peter Settman	Tim Meltreger	January 21, 2018	80

== Broadcast ==
The first two episodes of Swedish Dicks were premiered on September 2, 2016, by the Swedish online streaming service, Viaplay. Later that month, it was announced that the series had been picked up by the American company Lionsgate TV to be distributed worldwide. It was premiered in the United States on the Pop TV television network on August 9, 2017. In October 2016, the series was renewed for a second season that was shown in December 2017 in Northern Europe and in January 2018 in the United States.

== Reception ==
Swedish Dicks received mixed reviews from critics. Karolina Fjellborg of Aftonbladet wrote, "Initially, I felt a concern that this series would be more silly than funny, but soon I realized that it is actually both - and it works." Pål Nisja Wilhelmsen of SIDE3 found the first episode "shockingly weak" but pointed out that "the two leading roles have a good chemistry, and the script gives them room for friendly banter". He added that the series is "entertaining enough, but is probably no classic". Roger Wilson of Sveriges Radio wrote that Swedish Dicks is "one of those strange Swedish productions, where you think you do not need any act or joke if you just set it the United States and add guest appearances by Traci Lords and Keanu Reeves. It gets a little better when Traci Lords is in order, she can at least understand that she is part of a slapstick series." Steve Greene of IndieWire wrote, "... 'Swedish Dicks' still has one ray of hope in the form of Keanu Reeves. Though he only appears for the briefest of moments, his presence and giddy deliveries of southern twang pep talks are at that ideal intersection between heightened genre riffing and a dash of needed pathos. As the spectral memory of Ingmar's deceased stuntman partner Tex, Reeves is the kind of anchoring force that the rest of the scenes without him are in search of."
