= Traci Lords =

American actress (born 1968)

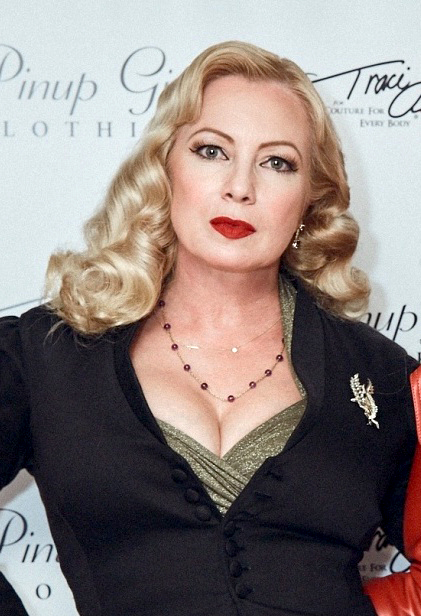
- Lords in 2014
- Born: Nora Louise Kuzma; May 7, 1968 (age 58); Steubenville, Ohio, U.S.
- Occupations: Actress; singer; model
- Years active: 1984–present
- Spouses: Brook Yeaton (m. 1990; div. 1995) Ryan Granger (m. 1999; div. 2000) Jeff Gruenewald (m. 2002)
- Children: 1
- Musical career
- Genres: Techno; trance; trip hop; pop
- Instrument: Vocals
- Labels: Radioactive; Sea to Sun
- Website: tracilords.com

Signature
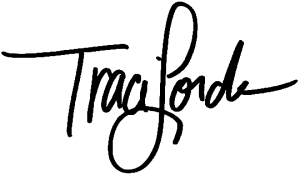

Traci Elizabeth Lords (born Nora Louise Kuzma; May 7, 1968) is an American actress, singer and former adult film actress. Following her departure from the adult film industry, she pursued an acting career, appearing in Cry-Baby (1990) and later in films, including Skinner (1993), Virtuosity (1995), Blade (1998), Zack and Miri Make a Porno (2008), and Excision (2012), for which she received the Fangoria Chainsaw Award for Best Supporting Actress, as well as the Fright Meter Award and the CinEuphoria Award. She has also appeared in television series, including Roseanne, Melrose Place, Profiler, First Wave and Swedish Dicks.

Lords recorded "Love Never Dies" for the soundtrack of Pet Sematary Two (1992) before signing with Radioactive Records and releasing her debut studio album, 1000 Fires (1995). Its lead single, "Control", peaked at number two on the Billboard Hot Dance Club Songs chart. A remix was included on the soundtrack to Mortal Kombat (1995), which was certified double platinum by the Recording Industry Association of America (RIAA).

While still a minor, Lords used forged identity documents to enter the adult film industry. After her true age was revealed in 1986, most of the adult films in which she had appeared were withdrawn from distribution in the United States because they constituted child pornography. In 2003, she published her autobiography, Traci Lords: Underneath It All, which debuted at number 31 on the New York Times Best Seller list.

== Early life ==
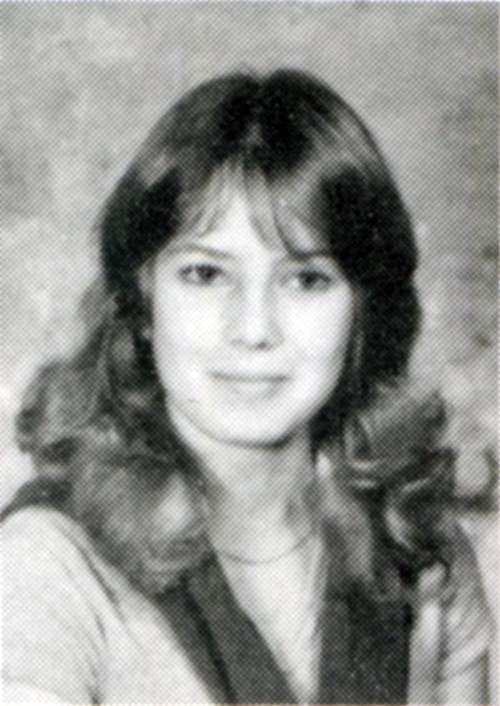
Lords (age 14) as a freshman at Redondo Union High School in 1983

Traci Lords was born Nora Louise Kuzma on May 7, 1968, in Steubenville, Ohio, to Louis and Patricia Kuzma. Her father was of Ukrainian descent, while her mother was of Irish ancestry. Louis was employed as a steelworker. Lords has one elder sister and two younger sisters. Her parents divorced when she was seven years old and Lords moved with her mother and three sisters to her great-grandmother's house. Following the divorce, her alcoholic, abusive father got partial custody. Around that same time, her mother enrolled at the College of Steubenville, now the Franciscan University of Steubenville, and became employed part-time.

In her autobiography, Traci Lords: Underneath It All, Lords recounts being raped by a 16-year-old boy she had a crush on when she was 10. She later described it as "the single most traumatizing thing that ever happened to me in my life." When Lords was 13, she moved with her sisters, her mother, and her mother's new boyfriend (who Lords refers to in her book by the name Roger Hays) to Redondo Beach, California. She did not see her father for many years after. In September 1982, she began attending Redondo Union High School but dropped out at age 15 to enter the porn industry. During her early school years, Lords developed a rebellious attitude, and was often angry at her mother. Although Hays, a cocaine dealer, initially treated her and the family well, he began entering Lords's bedroom at night and molesting her in her sleep. After her mother broke up with Hays due to his frequent drug use, her mother began dating Hays's friend, who offered to let the family temporarily live with him. Lords refused to follow them to a new place and her mother left her behind with her older sister Lorraine. Her mother and two younger sisters eventually found a new apartment.

I never wanted to be like my mother. You know, kids at sixteen, a husband who drinks and beats you. When I hit L.A., I said 'There's gonna be some changes here.' I hated the world. I was hateful to my mother. If I came home from a date at 11:30 and my mother questioned me, I'd say, 'I was out fucking somebody!' I wasn't. I just wanted to piss my mother off.

— Lords about her teenage years

== Career ==
=== 1984–1986: Start of career ===
At age 15, Lords became pregnant by her high school boyfriend. Afraid of her mother's reaction, she went to Hays for help, who arranged for her to have an abortion without her mother's knowledge. Living mostly on her own, Lords needed a job but struggled to find work due to her age, so Hays helped her get a fake ID and a stolen birth certificate - in the name Kristie Nussman - which added five years to her age. After applying to several jobs with no success, in February 1984 she answered a newspaper advertisement for Jim South's World Modeling Talent Agency. Posing as her stepfather, Hays drove her to the agency. Lords believed she was answering an ad for a normal modeling job, but once she arrived South asked her to get naked. According to Lords, after South gave her some champagne and cocaine, she agreed.

After signing a contract, she began working as a nude model and appeared in magazines such as Velvet, Juggs, and Club. That August, when she was selected to model for Penthouse magazine's 15th-anniversary issue, she was told she needed a "sexy" stage name; she chose Traci, a name she had wanted growing up, and took Lords from the actor Jack Lord, as she was fan of the television series Hawaii Five-O. In her book, she writes, "I added an 's' to Lord because there were three of us: Nora (my birth name), Kristie (my fake ID name), and now Traci (the girl everyone wanted)."

Lords, still only 15 years old, made her first porn movie in 1984, when she appeared in What Gets Me Hot! alongside Tom Byron, who later became her boyfriend off‑screen. In her next movie, Those Young Girls, she appeared in a sex role alongside Harry Reems and Ginger Lynn. After appearing with John Leslie in the porno parody Talk Dirty to Me Part III which won the AVN Award for the best movie, Lords was hailed as the "Princess of Porn". She became one of the highest-paid porn actresses of that time, earning more than $1,000 a day.

Besides her work in porn, she also appeared in the music video for "Gimme Gimme Good Lovin'" by the heavy metal band Helix. Lords continued making more movies until late 1984 when she tried to quit the industry at age 16, but returned a few months later. Before her 17th birthday, she met Stuart Dell, who became her boyfriend, manager, and business partner, under the pseudonym Steven (or Stephen) Cartier, and they formed the Traci Lords Company together. Dell and Lords made a distribution deal with Sy Adler, an industry veteran who ran Vantage International, in which they would produce three movies for the company. In March 1986, the first TLC feature was released, titled Traci Takes Tokyo, which was shot in Tokyo around Christmas Day 1985. The second, Beverly Hills Copulator, was released afterwards, but the third movie, Screamer, was shelved.

In May 1986, around three weeks after Lords's 18th birthday, authorities were informed that she had been underage when she appeared in the porn movies and that she had lied to law enforcement, photographers, producers, directors, co-workers, and the general public. The owners of her movie agency and X-Citement Video, Inc. were arrested and charged. She was taken into protective custody and hired lawyer Leslie Abramson. On July 10, district attorney's investigators searched Lords's Redondo Beach home as well as the Sun Valley offices of Vantage International Productions and the Sherman Oaks offices of modeling agent Jim South. South and other industry officials said that Lords, when seeking employment, had provided a California driver's license, a U.S. passport, and a birth certificate which stated that her name was Kristie Nussman and gave her birth date as November 17, 1962. Investigators were able to locate the real Kristie Nussman, who said that her birth certificate had been stolen a few years earlier. Two adults who knew Lords, but who requested anonymity, said they saw her picture in the adult magazine Velvet during July 1984 and telephoned the district attorney's office to inform authorities that she was underage, but that an investigator told them they couldn't take action.

On July 17, 1986, video rental shops and adult movie theaters in the U.S. had to remove from their inventory all hardcore material featuring Lords to avoid prosecution for distributing child pornography. John Weston, attorney for the Adult Film Association of America, said distributors should withdraw any movie made before May 1986 that featured Lords in sexual conduct. The withdrawal of Lords's movies from the market cost the industry millions of dollars. Government prosecutors declared that Lords was a victim of a manipulative industry, maintaining that she was drugged and made to perform non-consensual acts. Industry insiders, including Ron Jeremy, Tom Byron, Peter North, and Ginger Lynn said they never saw her use drugs and that she was always fully aware of her actions. While most of Lords's movies were permanently removed from distribution in the United States, several were re-edited to remove her scenes or had new footage filmed with a different actress playing her part. The only porn movie Lords appears in which is legally available in the United States is Traci, I Love You, which was filmed in Cannes, France two days after her 18th birthday.

Two Los Angeles–based producers, Ronald Kantor and Rupert McNee, as well as Jim South, were charged with filming a minor engaged in sexually explicit conduct. The prosecution eventually failed, as all three defendants argued that because Lords having shown government-issued ID showing a birthdate in 1962 they could not have known she was underage.

Another case, United States v. X-Citement Video, Inc., was brought against video store owner Rubin Gottesman, who was indicted in 1987 on charges of trafficking in child pornography by selling and distributing videos featuring Lords. Gottesman continued to distribute Lords videos well after other video wholesalers and retailers had removed those titles from their inventory, and undercover agents testified that he acknowledged knowing that Lords was under the age of 18 when she appeared in the videos. He was later convicted and incarcerated.

=== 1987–1991: Transition to mainstream, Not of This Earth and Cry-Baby ===
Lords enrolled at the Lee Strasberg Theatre and Film Institute, where she studied method acting for three months. After leaving the school, Lords placed an advertisement in The Hollywood Reporter looking for representation. She was contacted by Fred Westheimer and although the agency declined to officially represent her, he decided to send her out on a few auditions. As a result, she was offered a guest role in an episode of the television series Wiseguy. Shortly afterwards, she met the director Jim Wynorski, who was directing the remake of Roger Corman's 1957 sci-fi classic Not of This Earth. He immediately cast Lords into the lead role of Nadine Story, and Not of This Earth (1988) became her first mainstream film since her departure from the adult film industry. Although the film failed at the box office, it did well in video sales. Based on that success, Lords was offered to appear in Wynorski's next film, The Haunting of Morella (1989). However, Lords turned down the offer due to the requirement of having a nude scene since she was trying to establish herself as a serious actress. She also signed with a modeling agency under her birth name Nora Kuzma and appeared on two covers of Joe Weider's magazine Muscle & Fitness. Around that time, Lords became a spokesperson for Children of the Night, an organization for runaways and abused children, and planned to release a book titled Out of the Blue: The Traci Lords Story.

In November 1988, Lords enrolled in another acting class and again began looking for an agent. In December, she mass-mailed her résumé to various agents and arranged a meeting with Don Gerler. Lords auditioned for the part of Breathless Mahoney in the film Dick Tracy (1990), but the role went to Madonna. By May 1989, John Waters cast her for his teenage comedy musical Cry-Baby (1990). She won the role and appeared in the film alongside Johnny Depp and Ricki Lake. The film was a critical and commercial success, and her portrayal of the rebellious teenager Wanda Woodward established her as a legitimate actress. On the set of the film, she met the property master Brook Yeaton, whom she began dating. The couple married in September 1990 in Baltimore, Maryland.

In June 1990, the exercise video Warm up with Traci Lords was released. Directed and produced by her former boyfriend and business partner Stewart Dell, the video had been filmed in early 1988. Lords was unsatisfied with the final version of the video. An extended version was reissued in 1993 under the title Traci Lords: Advanced Jazzthetics.

In 1991, Lords starred in the thriller Raw Nerve and the action crime film A Time to Die. Lords appeared in such popular TV shows as Roseanne, Married... with Children (Season 6. Episode 11: "Al Bundy, Shoe Dick" as Vanessa Van Pelt" in 1991)', MacGyver and Hercules. She continued modeling and walked the runway for fashion designers such as Janet Howard and Thierry Mugler.

=== 1992–1996: Breakthrough, 1000 Fires and Melrose Place ===
Lords authored a chapter for Suzanne Somer's 1992 book Wednesday's Children, which focuses on celebrity childhood abuse. In her chapter, Lords described verbal and emotional abuse by her father and attributed her involvement in pornography to this abuse and her father's "head trip" about sex.

During 1992, Lords decided to emphasize her career as a recording artist. She first signed a development deal with Capitol Records. After meeting with Rodney Bingenheimer at a birthday party, she was recommended to Jeff Jacklin, who hired her to record the song "Love Never Dies" for the movie Pet Sematary Two (1992). The producer of the soundtrack, Gary Kurfirst, signed Lords to his company Radioactive Records. She was later featured on the songs "Little Baby Nothing" by Manic Street Preachers and "Somebody to Love" by Ramones. During 1993, Lords was cast in the television adaptation of Stephen King's novel The Tommyknockers.

During the spring of 1994, Lords began working on her debut album. The company arranged her to fly to London and meet with producer Tom Bailey. After finishing her recording with Bailey, Lords was introduced to producer Ben Watkins of Juno Reactor with whom she recorded more techno-influenced songs. She later met Mike Edwards, the main singer of the band Jesus Jones. Around the same time, Lords was cast in the television series Roseanne, appearing in three episodes. During January 1995, Lords appeared in four episodes of the television series Melrose Place, where she played the part of Rikki Abbott. Her debut studio album, 1000 Fires, was released on February 28, 1995. It received generally positive reviews and the lead single "Control" peaked at number two on the Billboard Hot Dance Club Songs. An instrumental version of "Control" was remixed and released on the soundtrack to Mortal Kombat (1995), which was certified double platinum by the Recording Industry Association of America (RIAA). The album's second single, "Fallen Angel", was also successful in charts, peaking at number eleven on Hot Dance Club Songs. The Paul Oakenfold remix of the song was included on the soundtrack of the movie Virtuosity (1995), in which Lords had a cameo appearance. After the release of the album, Lords embarked on a small tour performing as a DJ, mostly in Miami nightclubs. On August 12, 1995, she was the opening act of the Lollapalooza after-party, Enit Festival, alongside Moby, Sven Väth, DJ Keoki and Single Cell Orchestra.

While not as commercially successful, the song "Father's Field" drew media attention because it was the first time Lords publicly claimed to have been sexually assaulted as a child. On January 17, 1995, Star magazine published the article "Traci Lords: Rape Turned Me Into Teen Porn Star," in which Lords said she was sexually assaulted at age 11. Details magazine ran another article in its May 1995 issue in which Lords described "Father's Field" as a true story.

By the end of 1995, Lords divorced her husband of five years, Brook Yeaton. In 1996, she appeared in a commercial for Guess with Juliette Lewis.

=== 1997–2002: Profiler, Blade and First Wave ===
In 1997, Lords appeared in a small part in the Gregg Araki film Nowhere, and starred in the low budget drama thriller Stir. She also guest starred on television series Nash Bridges and Viper. In November, she became a recurring cast member in the second season of the crime television series Profiler. In 1998, Lords had a supporting role in the crime thriller Boogie Boy and starred in the drama Extramarital. She appeared in the action horror film Blade (1998) in which she played the vampire seductress Racquel. Lords was eventually approached to appear in the sequel Blade II (2002) portraying Racquel's twin sister Valerine in seeking of vengeance upon Blade, which she turned down because of her contradictory schedule. At the premiere of the film, Lords announced she was finishing her sophomore album on Radioactive Records that would be released in the spring of 1999. However, it was later neglected after she left the record label. In August, Lords ended her two-year relationship with John Enos after they reportedly got into an argument because her pet cat was killed by one of Enos' pet dogs.

In 2000, Lords had lead roles in the films Epicenter and Chump Change. Her role of Sam in the romantic comedy Chump Change earned her the Film Discovery Jury Award for Best Actress at the U.S. Comedy Arts Festival. In September, she became a regular cast member in the third season of the Sci-fi Channel television series First Wave, becoming the first recurring female character to be featured on the series.

=== 2003–2006: Underneath It All ===
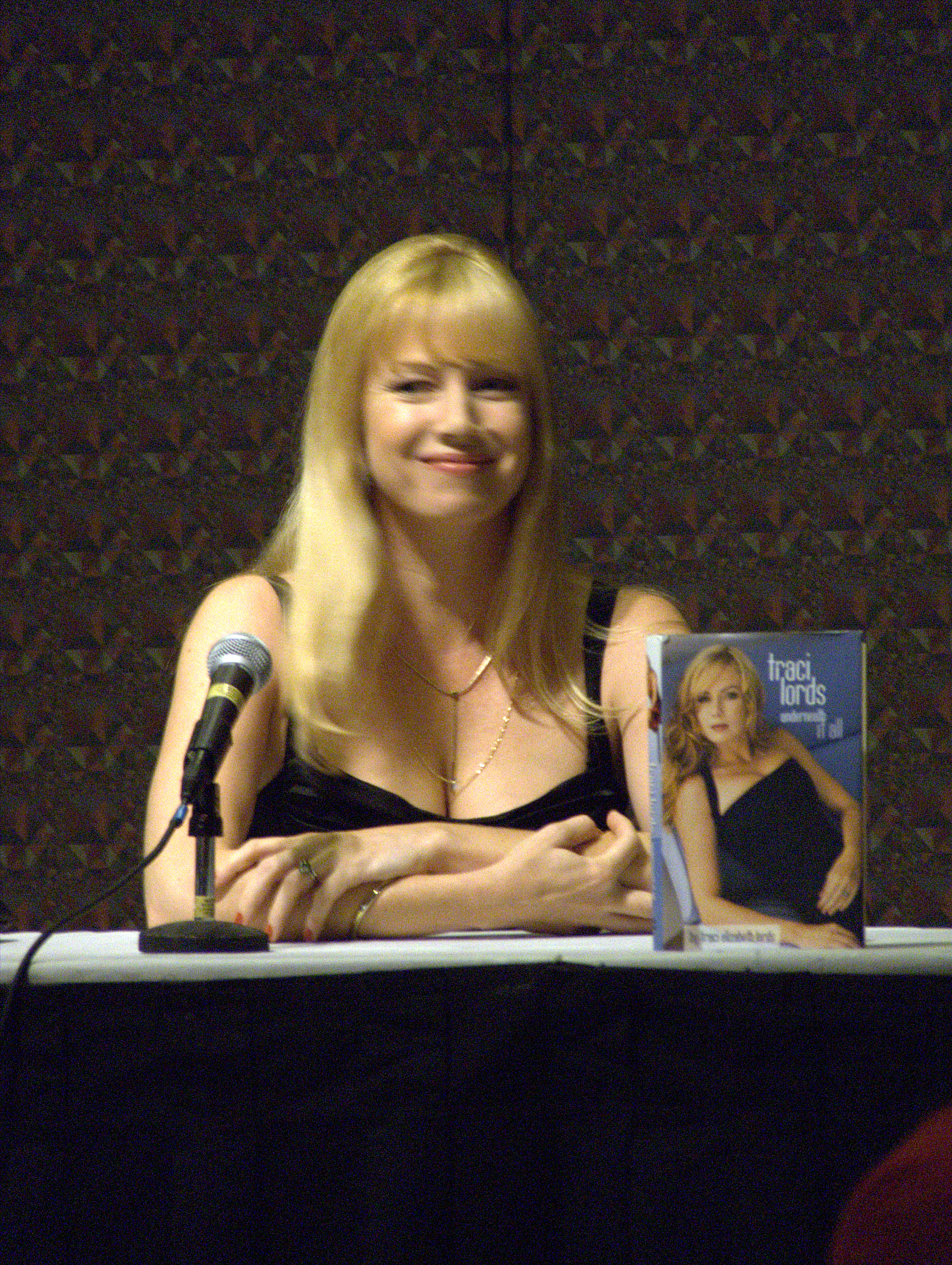
Lords at Dragon Con, 2006

Her autobiography, Traci Lords: Underneath It All, was published in July 2003 by HarperCollins. In the book, Lords chronicled her childhood, career, and two-year stint in the X-rated industry. Lords revealed that she received about $35,000 as total compensation for all her porno movies, including the $5,000 for her underage appearance in Penthouse. Lords continued to use the now-famous stage name that she had given herself as a minor and ultimately made it her legal name. The book received positive reviews from critics and was a commercial success, making The New York Times Best Seller list., but was criticized by pornographers, who claimed they were the victims.

During 2003, it was announced that Lords was working on new music and had recorded a cover version of Missing Persons' song "Walking In L.A.". Directed by Mike Ruiz, the music video was premiered during her interview on The Oprah Winfrey Show. On December 28, 2004, she independently released two songs, "Sunshine" and "You Burn Inside of Me", via online music store CD Baby. Both of the songs along with "What Cha Gonna Do" were featured in the television series Joan of Arcadia. "You Burn Inside of Me" was also used in the commercial for Duprey Cosmetics, in which Lords appeared. She signed to Sea To Sun records the following year, and released the chart-topping single "Last Drag".

=== 2007–2009: Motherhood and Zack and Miri Make a Porno ===
In early 2007, Lords became pregnant unexpectedly, which she announced in June 2007. On October 7, 2007, at the age of 39, she gave birth to her son Jeff Lee, her first child with her husband of five years.

In January 2008, it was announced that Lords had been cast in Kevin Smith's comedy Zack and Miri Make a Porno (2008). She said that at first she wanted to refuse, but changed her mind after reading the script. Initially, the character had a topless scene in the movie, but Lords refused. Lords chose to breastfeed her son in between takes.

In 2009, Lords appeared in the direct-to-DVD science fiction movie, Princess of Mars, alongside Antonio Sabàto Jr. She was disappointed by the final project.

=== 2010–2014: Return to music and Excision ===
In March 2010, Lords announced she began working on her new album with "Pretty" being the lead single. However, the project was later shelved and "Pretty" was released as a promotional single only. Lords starred in the drama comedy Au Pair, Kansas which premiered in April 2011 at the Kansas City FilmFest. In July, Lords officially signed to independent record label Sea To Sun Recordings and in October made her musical comeback with the song "Last Drag". The single was successful in dance charts debuting at number forty-five and eventually peaking at number four on the Billboard Dance Club Songs.

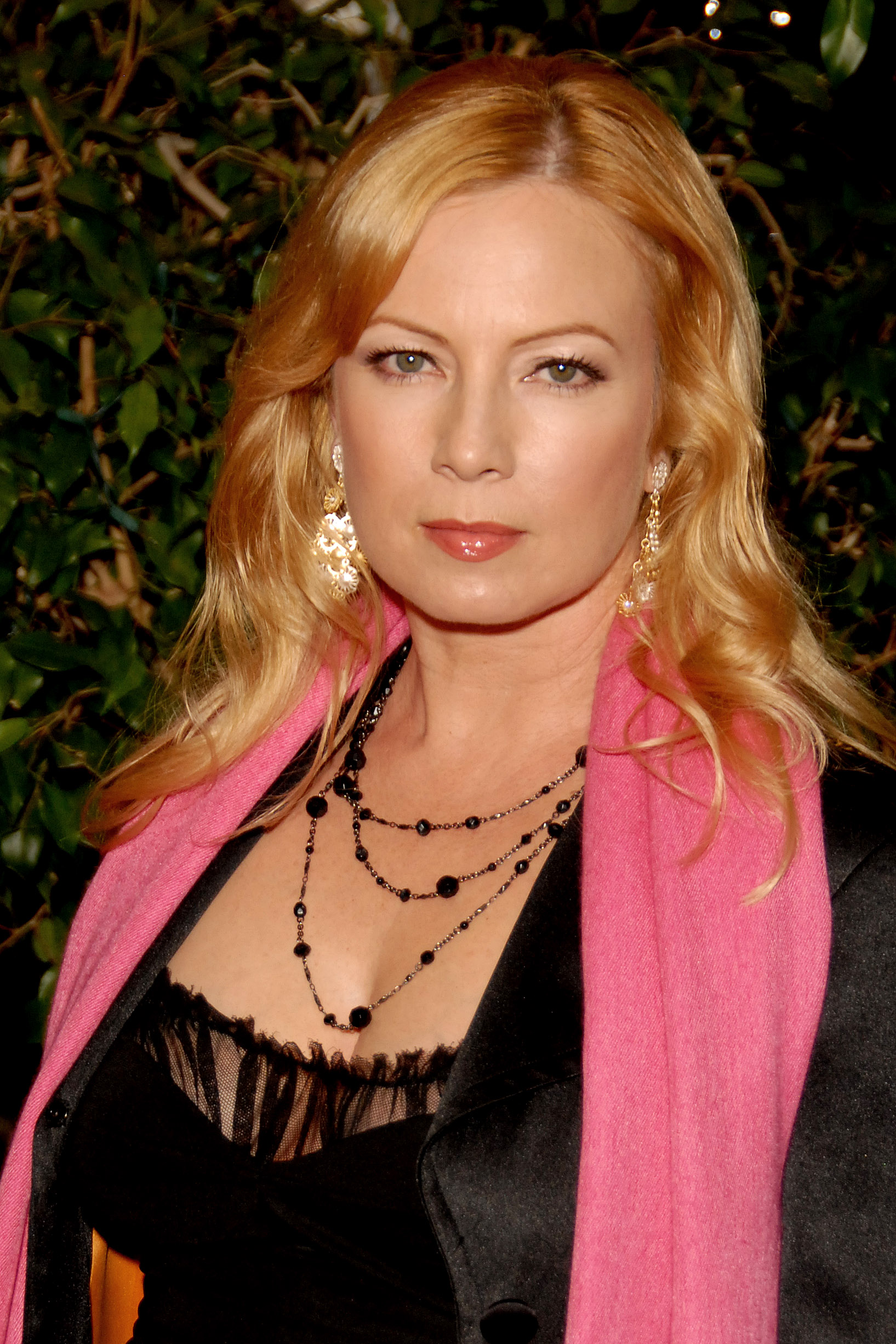
Lords in 2011

Lords starred alongside AnnaLynne McCord and Ariel Winter in the horror film Excision (2012), which premiered in January 2012 at the Sundance Film Festival. Her portrayal of the controlling mother Phyllis earned Lords Fangoria Chainsaw Award for Best Supporting Actress as well as Fright Meter Award and CinEuphoria Award. In September, Lords released a compilation of dance music Traci Lords Presents: M2F2 (2012). It featured three of her own remixed tracks as well as songs by other artists. The song "He's My Bitch" managed to chart on the Billboard Dance Club Songs peaking at number twenty-five. Lords also voiced the character of Layla Stockton in the 2012 video game Hitman: Absolution. Following the Steubenville High School rape case, Lords spoke up on the topic on the Piers Morgan Live show and subsequently released the song "Stupidville" as a response to the case. In 2013, Lords appeared in the horror movie Devil May Call (2013) and an episode of the web series EastSiders. She was nominated for the Best Guest Star – Drama at the 2014 Indie Series Awards.

=== 2015–present: Fashion career and upcoming directorial debut ===
In May 2015, Lords appeared in an episode of the fourth season of the reality television series Celebrity Wife Swap, where she swapped lives with Jackée Harry. Lords co-starred in Jim Wynorski's television horror Sharkansas Women's Prison Massacre (2015) and made her second appearance as Val on the series EastSiders. In March 2016, Lords co-starred in the television thriller Nightmare Nurse (2016). Lords voiced several characters in the video game Hitman (2016) after having previously voiced the character of Layla Stockton in Hitman: Absolution (2012).

In June, Lords announced her collaboration with Pinup Girl Clothing. The first pieces from her collection were inspired by the character of Wanda Woodward from Cry-Baby (1990) as well as 1950s fashion.

In 2016, Lords co-starred in the Viaplay original comedy series Swedish Dicks. In October, the series was renewed for a second season with Lords as a confirmed cast member. In the United States, the first season premiered in August 2017. Later that month, Lords confirmed she would direct her first feature film called The Unquiet Grave. Filming was scheduled to commence in 2017. In November, it was announced that Lords voiced the character of Jackal Z in the upcoming video game Let It Die (2016) and would appear on the third season of EastSiders. In July 2017, Helmut Lang's fashion campaign for the Fall 2017 collection featuring Lords was unveiled. In May 2018, Lords released the single "Come Alive" as a gift for her fans in celebration of her 50th birthday. Following the release it was announced that she began working on an EP with Adam Barta and Jordan Von Haslow. In July 2018, the second season of Swedish Dicks premiered in the United States.

In 2019, Lords starred in a Los Angeles revival of the stage play Women Behind Bars.

== Activism ==
Lords has publicly stated her support of the LGBTQ community.

== Discography ==
Studio albums

- 1000 Fires (1995)

Quest singles

- "Little Baby Nothing" by Manic Street Preachers from their debut album, Generation Terrorists (1992)

== Bibliography ==
- Traci Lords: Underneath It All (2003)

== See also ==
- Golden Age of Porn
