= 1000 Fires =

Studio album by Traci Lords
- Released: February 28, 1995
- Recorded: 1994
- Studios: London, United Kingdom
- Genre: Techno
- Length: 55:44
- Label: Radioactive
- Producers: Gary Kurfirst (exec.); Juno Reactor; Mike Edwards; Babble

Singles from 1000 Fires
- 1. "Control" Released: December 20, 1994; 2. "Fallen Angel" Released: August 3, 1995

1000 Fires is the debut studio album by American singer and actress Traci Lords, released on February 28, 1995, by Radioactive Records. The album remains her only full-length music release to date. Lords started working on the album in April 1994, and collaborated with producers Juno Reactor, Mike Edwards and Babble. Executive produced by Gary Kurfirst, 1000 Fires is predominantly influenced by electronic music with elements of techno, trance and trip hop. Lyrically, it mostly focuses on dark themes, referring to Lords's past in the porn industry or dealing with thoughts of suicide on "Fallen Angel". It was widely believed that Lords revealed her rape experience on the song "Father's Field", but Lords clarified that the song was about a "story character" and not herself: on page 213 of her 2003 autobiography, Underneath It All, Lords wrote, "I spent my free time in the hotel room staring out the window at the ocean below. Listening to a new artist named Tori Amos, I became inspired by the candid stories she told in her lyrics. She sang about being raped, and I found myself writing about the same thing, filling notebooks with random thoughts from years before. I titled that section of words 'Father's Field,' although it had nothing to do with my father's field. My father's backyard brought such vivid images to my mind that that's where my story character was placed."

Upon its release, the album received mixed reviews from music critics. It achieved moderate commercial success, but failed to enter the Billboard 200. It is currently out of print. During the promotion of the album, Lords performed as a DJ and opened shows for other artists such as Moby and the band My Life with the Thrill Kill Kult.

Two singles from the album were released. The lead single, "Control", peaked at number two on the Billboard Hot Dance Club Songs and its instrumental version was featured in the film Mortal Kombat (1995). The soundtrack to the film was certified double platinum by the Recording Industry Association of America (RIAA), which earned Lords her first music award. Its following single, "Fallen Angel", was also successful in charts, peaking at number eleven on Hot Dance Club Songs. The Paul Oakenfold remix of the song was included on the soundtrack to the film Virtuosity (1995), in which Lords had a cameo appearance.

== Background and recording ==
After her departure from the adult film industry and transition to mainstream films, Lords got signed for a development deal with Capitol Records, but was later dropped due to disagreements between her and the label. "They wanted to market me in the way that would make the most money. They wanted to make me the new Samantha Fox. And I never wanted that. That wasn't what it was about for me. I pretty much had a sense of myself, and I knew that I would be an imposter," Lords said.

Following the split up from her husband Brook Yeaton, Lords decided to focus on her career outside acting. She began taking vocal lessons and was encouraged by her coach to search for a new record deal. After meeting with American DJ Rodney Bingenheimer at a birthday party, she was recommended to Jeff Jacklin, who hired her to record the song "Love Never Dies" for the 1992 film Pet Sematary Two. The producer of the soundtrack, Gary Kurfirst, signed her for a development deal with his label Radioactive Records.

"I've kept personal journals since about the age of nine, and some lyrics were actually taken from them; I remember talking to Ben (Watkins of Juno Reactor) one day about suicide when something struck a chord - I looked back at the journals that I'd written when I was about ten, and the words that I found were the same words that I used in the song, words that I wrote when I was just a child."

— Lords on creating the lyrics to the song "Fallen Angel"

In April 1994, the label arranged her to fly to London and meet with producer Tom Bailey. They recorded the songs "I Want You", "Fly" and "Just Like Honey", which was later re-recorded by Keith Fernley of Bailey's group Babble with a different set of lyrics and became the song "Father's Field". Lords used lyrics she had previously written in New Zealand, having been inspired by Tori Amos. After finishing her recording with Bailey, Lords wanted something with a harder edge to add another dimension to her album. She was introduced to producer Ben Watkins of the electronic group Juno Reactor and decided to incorporate more rave sound. Mainly inspired by the music she would hear at warehouse parties during her stay in London, Lords teamed up with American singer Wonder with whom she created the lyrics to the song "Control". Lords later commented on the inspiration behind the album's sound: "It was in England that I fell in love with techno music. I was working in the UK doing some modelling a couple of years ago, and I was sharing a flat with some other girls in South London. We were really broke, and the cheapest place to go and have a good night out were raves - you could get in for about three bucks. So I went to a lot of raves and clubs, and I fell in love with the music - it was something that wasn't happening in the States at the time." Lords recorded three more songs with Watkins; "Good-N-Evil", "Outlaw Lover" and "Fallen Angel".

Later she met Mike Edwards, the lead singer of the band Jesus Jones. They recorded the songs "Distant Land", "Say Something" and "Okey Dokey"; the latter of which they recorded as a joke at the end of a recording session.

== Title and artwork ==
When asked about the album's title, Lords said: "I think that fire is something that's really representative of the record. It's really, really peaceful and you're drawn to it. But if you get too close, it can torch you and kill you. But if you just get close enough, it's warm and it's soothing, it's mesmerising and it's peaceful. It can give you everything or destroy you, depending on how smart you are." The cover sleeve was shot by Joshua Jordan.

== Composition ==
"Control" (1994)
An up-tempo dance track featuring heavy guitar riffs and techno influenced beat.

The album's opening track and lead single, "Control", is an up-tempo electronic song. Heavily influenced by techno and trance, it contains a prominent electric guitar riff. "I told Ben [Watkins] I wanted to do a song that had elements of rock and roll but with a techno vibe and he ran with it, creating a slamming heavy metal guitar intro on an insanely hyper track." The song is about a dominant female who nurses a broken heart as she sings, "Let me kiss it and make it better/After tonight you will forget her". "Fallen Angel" is also an up-tempo techno-trance song with elements of ambient music. It features Spanish guitar and castanets. The lyrics were influenced by and written surrounding the death of Kurt Cobain. The third track, "Good-N-Evil", incorporates elements of industrial music. "Fly" is a mid-tempo song built around a trip hop beat. The album's fifth track and the only ballad on the album, "Distant Land", contains elements of ambient music and features mellow guitar melody. Lyrically, the song is a tale of a woman waking up lost and not knowing where she is, searching for light in a distant land.

"Outlaw Lover", the sixth track from the album, is an up-tempo electronic song. It contains strong techno elements and features male opera vocals. Lords cast herself as a woman in a small town who had been wronged, and tells her unfaithful lover "You best be warned I'm a woman scorned," before shooting him dead. The lyrics were inspired by cowboy stories and old westerns. The following track, "I Want You", is another song with strong trip hop influences and oriental vibe. "Say Something" also incorporates trip hop music within its composition.

== Release and promotion ==
Following the release of the album, Lords embarked on a small tour performing as a DJ, mostly in the Miami club scene. On August 12, 1995, she was the opening act of the Lollapalooza after party, Enit Festival, alongside Moby, Sven Väth, DJ Keoki and Single Cell Orchestra.

"Control" was released as the lead single from the album on December 20, 1994. The song received critical acclaim, especially for its rave sound which was unexpected from Lords. It peaked at number two on the Billboard Hot Dance Club Songs and number 84 on the UK Singles Chart. Its instrumental version was featured on the soundtrack to the 1995 film Mortal Kombat. The music video was shot in Los Angeles, California, and was inspired by James Bond with Lords portraying the female version of the character.

The album's second single, "Fallen Angel", released on August 3, 1995, was also successful in charts, peaking at number eleven on Hot Dance Club Songs. Lords managed to get Paul Oakenfold to add the song to his DJ set. His remix of the song was included on the soundtrack to the film Virtuosity (1995), in which Lords had a cameo. Two music videos for the song were released: one features the original version of the song and was shot during the making of the film Virtuosity; the second version, directed by Stéphane Sednaoui, features the "Honeymoon Stitch Mix", produced by Chad Smith and Dave Navarro, then of Red Hot Chili Peppers.

== Reception ==
Professional ratings
Review scores
Source	Rating
AllMusic	3/5 stars
Robert Christgau	(dud)
Entertainment Weekly	B+
The Guardian	2/4 stars
Knoxville News Sentinel	3/5 stars
NME	6/10

Upon its release, 1000 Fires received mixed reviews from music critics. Stephen Thomas Erlewine at AllMusic called it "a competent exercise in techno". He criticized Lords's vocals as being "thin" and not having much range, but also remarked that "she does have a forceful and distinctive personality, which gives the record a cohesive sound." Benjamin Svetkey at Entertainment Weekly gave the album a B+, referring to Lords as "Moby with estrogen injections". The Guardian stated that "there's no saying a former under-age porn star can't make decent records and – shock! – that's exactly what her debut album is." noting that her "come-hither whisper works well on ambient items like Distant Land." while the album was brought down by "some terrible dance-by-numbers things"

Cashbox stated "before the gales of laughter kick in, there’s one thing fans should know. The record isn't half-bad. Lords doesn't attempt to show herself as a serious songwriter or an accomplished musician, instead having fun with her techno stylings. Fans of techno dance will find some pleasure in this record, but she still shouldn't give up acting."

Despite the good chart position of the lead single, 1000 Fires did not achieve mainstream success. Lords later commented: "The problem with that album was that it was ahead of its time. Electronica was just starting to happen. Moby was just starting to be huge. I opened for Thrill Kill Kult and Moby as a DJ back then. The masses didn't know who Moby was. I think if it had been slightly delayed it would have done better. Madonna had it right to wait for Ray of Light. She has been a lot better with her timing than me. I am proud of that album because I hear it now and it still feels current. It doesn't feel dated."

== Track listing ==
No.	Title	Writer(s)	Producer(s)	Length
1.	"Control"	Traci Lords; Ben Watkins; Wonder	Juno Reactor	7:10
2.	"Fallen Angel"	Lords; Watkins; Johann Bley	Juno Reactor	4:59
3.	"Good-N-Evil"	Watkins	Juno Reactor	6:28
4.	"Fly"	Babble	Babble	4:09
5.	"Distant Land"	Lords; Mike Edwards; Bleu	Edwards	7:01
6.	"Outlaw Lover"	Lords; Watkins; Maria Nayler; Stephane Holweck	Juno Reactor	3:52
7.	"I Want You"	Babble	Babble	6:01
8.	"Say Something"	Lords; Edwards	Edwards	4:07
9.	"Father's Field"	Lords; Babble	Babble	5:39
10.	"Okey Dokey"	Lords	Edwards	6:18
Total length:				55:44

Japanese edition bonus track
No.	Title	Writer(s)	Producer(s)	Length
11.	"Control" (Overlords House Mix)	Lords; Watkins; Wonder	Juno Reactor; Christian Johansson^{[a]}; Rune Bendixen^{[a]}	7:21
Total length:				63:05

Notes

- ^{^[a]} signifies an additional producer

== Credits and personnel ==
- Traci Lords – vocals
- Gary Kurfirst – executive production
- Juno Reactor – programming, production
- Babble – production
- Mike Edwards – production, remixing
- Nick Burton – drums (track 3)
- B. J. Cole – pedal steel guitar (track 6)
- Ronald Sam – operatic vocals (track 6)
- Otto the Barbarian – engineering (tracks 1–3, 6)
- Nahoko Maehara – engineering assistance (tracks 1–3)
- Keith Fernley – engineering, mixing, production assistance (tracks 4, 7, 9)
- Mike Ash – remixing (track 4)
- Ian Richardson – engineering (tracks 5, 8, 10)
- Eddy Schreyer – mastering

- Tim Stedman – art direction
- Joshua Jordan – photography
- REY International – design

Credits adapted from the album's liner notes.

== Chart performance ==
=== Singles ===
Year	Title	Chart	Position
1995	"Control"	US Billboard Hot Dance Club Songs	2
1995	"Control"	UK Singles Chart	81
1995	"Fallen Angel"	US Billboard Hot Dance Club Songs	11
1995	"Fallen Angel"	UK Singles Chart	72
