= Traci Lords: Underneath It All =

2003 autobiography by Traci Lords

- Front cover of Traci Lords: Underneath It All
- Author: Traci Lords
- Language: English
- Genre: Autobiography
- Publisher: HarperCollins
- Publication date: July 8, 2003
- Publication place: United States
- Media type: Print (Hardcover and Paperback)
- Pages: 304
- ISBN: 9780062217233

Traci Lords: Underneath It All is an autobiography by American actress and singer Traci Lords, first published on July 8, 2003, by HarperCollins. It was reissued as a paperback on June 29, 2004, with an additional chapter and photos. The book primarily details Lords's career in the adult film industry, when she appeared underage in dozens of pornographic films and became one of the most notable pornstars of the 1980s. It also chronicles her childhood, transition to mainstream films and musical career.

Traci Lords: Underneath It All received positive response from critics and was a commercial success. It debuted at number thirty-one on The New York Times Best Seller list. However, the book met with criticism from adult film industry insiders, some of whom accused Lords of lying.

== Summary ==
Lords was born Nora Louise Kuzma in Steubenville, Ohio. Her parents divorced when she was seven-years-old due to her father's abusive behavior, and she moved with her mother and three sisters to her great-grandmother's house. When she was ten, she was raped by a sixteen-year-old acquaintance. At the age of twelve, Kuzma moved with her mother and sisters to Lawndale, California, along with her mother's boyfriend Roger, who was a cocaine dealer. She began attending Redondo Union High School in Redondo Beach, California. At 14, she became pregnant by her high school boyfriend. Searching for a job in order to get money for an abortion, Kuzma was introduced to Roger's friend Lynn for whom she started working as a babysitter. Lynn offered to help her solve her job problems by getting her a fake ID. Her new ID, with the name of Kristie Elizabeth Nussman, stated she was 22 rather than 15. She ran away from home and ended up on the streets of Hollywood where she landed a job as a nude model. After appearing in a nude centerfold in Penthouse magazine (she was only 15 when the photos were taken), Kuzma became nationally known as Traci Lords. From there she appeared in numerous adult films and magazines until authorities discovered she had been a minor and started an extensive investigation of all her co-workers.

== Writing and development ==
Lords first talked about her plans to write a book during an interview with Ross Shafer on April 18, 1988. Later, in July, it was confirmed that a book titled Out of the Blue: The Traci Lords Story was in development. Lords and co-author Marvin J. Wolf created a 25-page book proposal that included 17 chapter summaries and a 14-page sample chapter titled "Fuck the Centerfold". However, the project was shelved due to problems with the publishing deal. On November 4, 2000, when Lords was a guest on The Howard Stern Show, she was again asked about the book but said she had no intentions of putting it out at that time.

== Release and promotion ==
Traci Lords: Underneath It All was first released in 2003 by HarperCollins. The paperback version of the book was released on June 29, 2004, with an additional chapter and photos. Lords promoted the book on numerous talk shows such as The Oprah Winfrey Show and Larry King Live. In her interview with Oprah, she explained she was not trying to deny her past: "I found you can run, but you cannot hide."

== Critical response ==
The book received relatively positive reviews from critics. Susan Carpenter, writing in the Los Angeles Times, called the book "a luridly fascinating, if horrifying, tell-all, from her birth in an eastern Ohio steel town to her present-day life as an actress and recording artist who is happily married in L.A." Amanda Tyler of USA Today commented: "Lords' story of personal redemption is so immersed in genuine emotion and beaming with soulful resiliency that the reader will walk away with nothing but respect for her and her remarkable journey." Bill Zwecker, who reviewed the book for Chicago Sun-Times, noted: "'Graphic' is said to be quite the understatement for the memoirs former under-age porn star Traci Lords has penned." John Patterson of The Guardian wrote: "It has porn's typical, irreversible-nosedive trajectory: fake IDs, serious money, major narcotics – the lowest, stickiest rung on stardom's ladder – followed by exposure (of entirely the wrong sort), disgrace, and rehabilitation."

Despite the favorable reviews, the book met with criticism from adult film industry insiders, some of whom accused Lords of lying. Co-workers from that time such as John Leslie, Ron Jeremy, Ginger Lynn and Tom Byron said they never saw her use drugs and insisted she was always fully aware of her actions. One of her co-workers from that time, Christy Canyon, said about Lords's autobiography, "I think her book could have been fabulous, except that she was lying throughout the whole thing."

Lords sister, Rachel Kuzma, wrote Los Angeles Times in response to an article they published about Lords book, where she criticized the fact checking of the publisher of the book, various criticisms of Lords and her truthfulness, the veracity of various statements in the book and that she believed the book was "misleading and self-aggrandizing."

== Publication history ==
Region	Release date	Format
United States	July 8, 2003	Hardcover
United States	June 29, 2004	Paperback
Australia	September 1, 2003	Hardcover
