= Gaston Gerald =

American politician (born 1931)

Member of the Louisiana Senate from the 13th district
- In office 1972–1981
- Succeeded by: Mike Cross

Member of the Baton Rouge City-Parish Council
- In office 1965–1972
- Preceded by: Woodrow W. Dumas

Personal details
- Born: October 20, 1931 (age 94) Washington Parish, Louisiana
- Party: Democratic
- Spouse: Lorraine Cambre
- Children: 3
- Occupation: Farmer

Gaston Gerald (born October 20, 1931) is an American former politician from the state of Louisiana who served in the Louisiana Senate.

Gerald served on the Baton Rouge City-Parish Council from 1965 to 1972 representing Ward II. He succeeded council member W.W. Dumas upon Dumas' election as mayor-president. In 1972, he was elected to the Louisiana State Senate to represent district 13. In 1979, Gerald was convicted on charges of attempted extortion of a contractor relating to the construction of the Baton Rouge Civic Center and was imprisoned at Federal Correctional Institution, Fort Worth, in Texas. He was expelled from the State Senate in 1981 on a 33-3 vote, the only senator in the history of the institution to have been expelled.
