= United States v. X-Citement Video, Inc. =

- Supreme Court of the United States

Argued October 5, 1994 Decided November 29, 1994
- Full case name: United States v. X-Citement Video, Inc.
- Citations: 513 U.S. 64 (more) 115 S. Ct. 464; 130 L. Ed. 2d 372
- Argument: Oral argument

Case history
- Subsequent: 982 F.2d 1285 (9th Cir. 1992), reversed.

Holding
- Conviction under federal statute prohibiting use of minor in pornographic film and distribution of same requires proof of knowledge that performer was a minor at time of production. As so interpreted, the statute is constitutional. Ninth Circuit reversed and remanded.

Court membership
- Chief Justice William Rehnquist Associate Justices John P. Stevens · Sandra Day O'Connor; Antonin Scalia · Anthony Kennedy; David Souter · Clarence Thomas; Ruth Bader Ginsburg · Stephen Breyer

Case opinions
- Majority: Rehnquist, joined by Stevens, O'Connor, Kennedy, Souter, Ginsburg, Breyer
- Concurrence: Stevens
- Dissent: Scalia, joined by Thomas

United States v. X-Citement Video, Inc., 513 U.S. 64 (1994), was a federal criminal prosecution filed in the United States District Court for the Central District of California in Los Angeles against X-Citement Video and its owner, Rubin Gottesman, on three charges of trafficking in child pornography, specifically videos featuring the underaged Traci Lords. In 1989, a federal judge found Gottesman guilty and later sentenced him to one year in jail and a $100,000 fine.

The defense challenged the constitutionality of certain sections of the federal laws against child pornography, claiming they were unconstitutionally vague. On appeal, the United States Court of Appeals for the Ninth Circuit agreed and reversed the district decision in 1992. The case was appealed again to the Supreme Court, which, in turn, by a 7-2 vote, reversed the ruling of the Ninth Circuit on November 29, 1994, because the relevant sections could be interpreted in a way that is constitutional.

== Background ==
In 1986, federal and local authorities discovered that actress Traci Lords had made pornographic movies while she was underage. This incident formed the basis of several actions against people working in the pornography industry.

Rubin Gottesman owned X-Citement Video. In June 1986 he was visited by Los Angeles Police Officer Steven Takeshita and FBI Agent Nellie Magdaloyo. They posed as pornography retailers who wanted to buy videos from him. They made several more visits that year, culminating in Gottesman sending Lords videos to Hawaii in early 1987. In the course of the investigation, they witnessed Gottesman giving acknowledgement of prior knowledge that Lords was underage during the making of those movies.

== Ninth Circuit Court of Appeals ruling ==
The Ninth Circuit ruled that the sections in the Protection of Children Against Sexual Exploitation Act of 1977 dealing with the interstate transportation of underage pornography is unconstitutional. Part of the relevant provision states:

(a) Any person who: (1) knowingly transports or ships in interstate or foreign commerce by any means, including by computer or mails, any visual depiction, if

(A) the producing of such visual depiction involves the use of a minor engaging in sexually explicit conduct and
(B) such visual depiction is of such conduct;

shall be punished as provided in subsection (b) of this section.

The defense asserted that the word "knowingly" in section (1), judging from the grammar, did not extend to the conduct described in subsection (A) or (B).

If interpreted this way, the result would be that anybody buying or selling movies without knowing their content might be held criminally liable. This was the basis for the Ninth Circuit Court finding the law in violation of the First Amendment.

== Supreme Court ==
The decision was appealed to the United States Supreme Court. With a majority of 7–2, they ruled to reverse the decision of the Ninth Circuit and uphold the criminal conviction.

They explained that if a law can be interpreted in a way that is constitutional, then that interpretation must be used rather than declaring the law unconstitutional. In effect, they made the word "knowingly" extend to the other clauses.

Justice Antonin Scalia filed a dissenting opinion, in which Justice Clarence Thomas joined. In Scalia's dissent, he acknowledged this rule but only in cases where the new interpretation does not need an ungrammatical reading of the statute.

Gottesman was incarcerated at the Federal Medical Center, Fort Worth, Texas and released on June 20, 1997.

== See also ==
- List of United States Supreme Court cases, volume 513
- List of United States Supreme Court cases by the Rehnquist Court
- List of United States Supreme Court cases involving the First Amendment
