= Dead Vent 7 =

Studio album by Single Cell Orchestra
- Released: 1995
- Genre: Ambient
- Label: Reflective Records

Single Cell Orchestra chronology
Dead Vent 7 (1995)	Single Cell Orchestra (1996)

Dead Vent 7 is the first full-length album by Single Cell Orchestra. It was released in 1995 on Reflective Records. The album, presents distorted spoken word vocals by the project creator Miguel Fierro, presenting a story space horror story, as well was Fierro's as bleeps, drones, and rhythms.

Professional ratings
Review scores
Source	Rating
Muzik	3/5 stars

== Track listing ==
1. "The Portal"
2. "Approaching DSS-723"
3. "Comsat"
4. "Dimea Battlestation"
5. "Science Officer Porter to Team Recon"
6. "Silo Master Control"
7. "Access Seraphim Flight Log"

== Plot ==
In the future, a military team is sent to investigate the disappearance of a Dead Vent 7 operative in a vessel that has been overrun by an alien presence, which kills the investigators.
