= Viaplay =

Swedish video streaming service

- Website type: Streaming service
- Predecessor: Viasat On Demand
- Area served: Australia; Austria; Germany; Nordics; Switzerland
- Owner: Viaplay Group
- Website: viaplay.com
- Launched: May 2007 (as Viasat On Demand) 2011 (as Viaplay)

Viaplay is a Swedish video streaming service owned by Viaplay Group.

== History ==
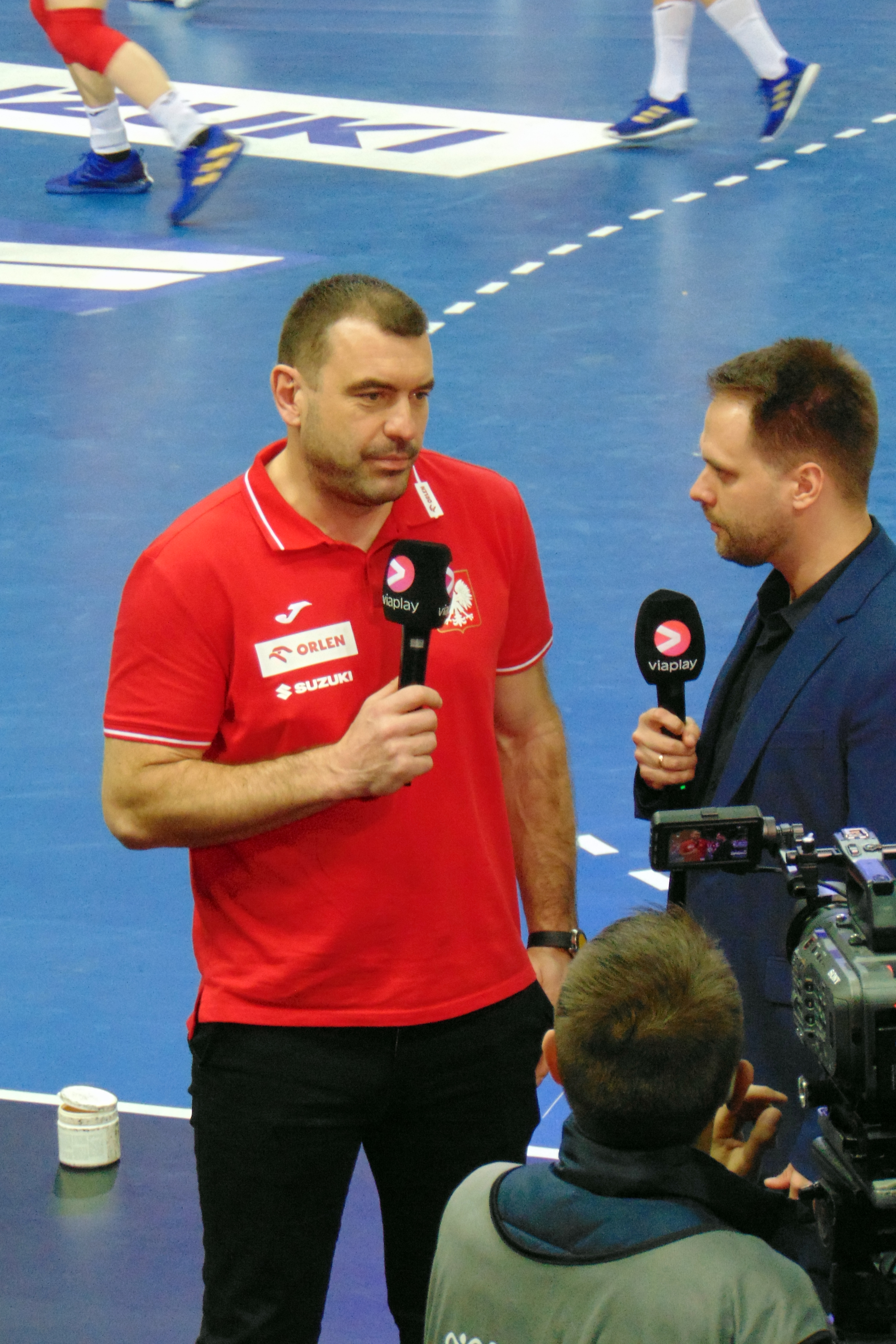
A Viaplay reporter interviews Bartosz Jurecki during the 2023 World Men's Handball Championship.

Originally owned by Modern Times Group, it was launched in May 2007 as Viasat On Demand. It was rebranded as Viaplay in 2011. Viaplay released its first original fiction title, Swedish Dicks, in 2016. As of 2021 it was available in Denmark, Estonia, Finland, Iceland, Latvia, Lithuania, Norway, Poland, and Sweden. Capitalizing on the popularity of Nordic noir titles, the service rolled out plans to expand to Ireland, the Netherlands and UK in November 2022, and Austria, Canada, Germany, Switzerland, and the US by 2023. Viaplay launched in the United States ahead of the previously planned schedule, initially exclusively to Comcast customers, with the intention to launch a direct-to-consumer platform later.

As the parent company Viaplay Group holds extensive sports rights in multiple markets, Viaplay provides sports broadcasts in most countries where it operates.

In May 2022, Viaplay announced the organisation had added the National Hockey League and Poland-based MMA promotion KSW to its UK offering. In July 2022, Viaplay Group acquired U.K.-based pay TV channel operator, Premier Sports, and rebranded it under the Viaplay name by 1 November 2022.

On 20 July 2023, it was announced that Viaplay would lay off 25% of staff while pursuing a new strategy to focus on its core Nordic, Netherlands and Viaplay Select operations. The new focus means that Viaplay will completely exit from its Baltic markets, and discontinue its low tier non-sports offering in each of its remaining international markets, including the United States and United Kingdom, in order to focus on its sports offering and the sale of non-sports content through its Viaplay Select business.

In 2024, SSBL Ltd bought back Viaplay's operations in the United Kingdom and the service was rebranded back to Premier Sports, its former name until 2022. Viaplay also left the US, Canada, Baltic, and UK markets in the beginning of 2024 as part of their new strategy.

In October 2026, the sale of Viaplay's activities in The Netherlands to DPG Media was finalized.

== Launch ==
Launch rollout timeline
Release date	Country/territory	Status
May 2007	Denmark	Available
May 2007	Finland	Available
May 2007	Norway	Available
May 2007	Sweden	Available
1 April 2020	Iceland	Available
28 July 2016 (original)–19 September 2018 (original) 9 March 2021 (relaunch)–22 March 2024 (relaunch)	Estonia	Discontinued
28 July 2016 (original)–19 September 2018 (original) 9 March 2021 (relaunch)–22 March 2024 (relaunch)	Latvia	Discontinued
28 July 2016 (original)–19 September 2018 (original) 9 March 2021 (relaunch)–22 March 2024 (relaunch)	Lithuania	Discontinued
3 August 2021–30 June 2025	Poland	Discontinued
1 March 2022	Netherlands	Discontinued
1 November 2022–22 May 2024 (Note: Viaplay Select is still available through third parties in the United Kingdom.)	United Kingdom	Discontinued
2 November 2022 (via SBS On Demand)	Australia	Available
26 January 2023 (via Canal+)	Austria	Available
22 February 2023–29 February 2024 (Note: Viaplay Select is still available through third parties in the United States.)	United States	Discontinued
7 March 2023–28 February 2024 (Note: Viaplay Select is still available through third parties in Canada.)	Canada	Discontinued
19 April 2023 (via Magenta TV) 22 October 2024 (via Amazon Prime Video)	Germany	Available
1 September 2023 (via Oneplus)	Switzerland	Available
