= Control (Traci Lords song) =

Single by Traci Lords

from the album 1000 Fires
- Released: December 20, 1994
- Recorded: 1994
- Genre: Industrial techno
- Length: 6:44
- Label: Radioactive
- Songwriters: Traci Lords; Wonder Schneider; Ben Watkins
- Producer: Juno Reactor

Traci Lords singles chronology
"Control" (1994)	"Fallen Angel" (1995)

"Control" is a song recorded by American actress and singer Traci Lords, from her 1995 debut album 1000 Fires. It was released as the lead single from the album by Radioactive Records on December 20, 1994. The song was written by Lords, Wonder Schneider and Ben Watkins. Produced by Juno Reactor, "Control" is a techno song with ambiguous lyrics about a dominant female who nurses a broken heart of her lover. Lords later stated she initially wrote the song about a drug addiction.

The song received positive reviews from music critics. In the United States, it failed to enter the Billboard Hot 100. However, it managed to be successful on the Billboard Hot Dance Club Songs chart, peaking at number two. In the United Kingdom, the song peaked at number eighty-one on the UK Singles Chart. An instrumental version of "Control" was released on the soundtrack to the film Mortal Kombat (1995), which was certified double platinum by the Recording Industry Association of America (RIAA), and earned Lords her first music award.

The accompanying music video for "Control" was directed by Graeme Joyce. Inspired by James Bond, Lords portrays the female version of the character driving and walking in the streets of Los Angeles. She also portrays the character of Jill Masterson from the film Goldfinger (1964), when various images are projected on Lords's body as well as being depicted as the "golden girl" from that film. Her long-time collaborator John Waters also appears in the video.

== Background and recording ==
Lords began working on her debut album 1000 Fires (1995) in the spring of 1994 with producer Tom Bailey and his newly formed group Babble. After finishing her recording with Bailey, she wanted to record something with a harder edge to add another dimension to her album, in contrast to the trip hop songs recorded with Babble. She was introduced to producer Ben Watkins of Juno Reactor who helped her incorporate techno rave sound to her record. Together, they recorded four songs: "Control", "Fallen Angel", "Good-N-Evil", and "Outlaw Lover".

== Composition ==
"Control" (1994)
An up-tempo dance track featuring heavy guitar riffs and techno influenced beat.

"Control" was written by Lords, Wonder Schneider and Ben Watkins. Musically, it is an uptempo techno song with elements of rock and industrial music. It features a prominent electric guitar riff and is set in common time with a tempo of 141 beats per minute. Lords's vocals are spoken rather than sung.

Lyrically, the song appears to be about a dominant female who nurses a broken heart of her lover as she sings "Let me kiss it and make it better/After tonight you will forget her". However, Lords later stated she initially wrote it about a drug addiction.

"You will forget her" was always about "Forget your heroin." It was never about a person. When I wrote it, it didn't even cross my mind. But then, yeah, sure, later, I thought, "Let me kiss it - and I went, "Oh, ****!" But that's not where I was coming from. It really wasn't. Now I see it, it has all these double images. Which I think is brilliant. Maybe, subconsciously, I knew. But when I wrote it, I was coming from such a different place. The line "I will control your soul." To me, the only thing that ever controlled my soul were drugs.

== Critical reception ==
"Control" met with generally positive reviews from music critics. Larry Flick from Billboard wrote that Lords is "poised to make a formidable splash in club waters" calling the song "wickedly contagious trance/rave stomper". Chuck Campbell from Knoxville News Sentinel said "Control" "is a great late-night dance song with appropriately self-assured lyrics". Andrew Mueller from Melody Maker described it as "a thumping if straightforward techno workout, doubtless intended to reinforce, musically and lyrically, Lords' refusal to compromise to the usual rules of pop as a second career." Tommy Udo from NME viewed the song as "pop techno as opposed to cutting edge, but none the worse for that. Traci is no Aretha Franklin, but makes the most of the voice she has, delivering her vocals in a breathy, Julee Cruise style."

== Music video ==
Lords in the music video portraying the character of Jill Masterson from the film Goldfinger (1964)

The accompanying music video for "Control" was filmed in Los Angeles, California and was directed by Graeme Joyce. Lords's long-time collaborator and director John Waters, with whom she had previously worked on films Cry-Baby (1990) and Serial Mom (1994), also appears in the video. The main inspiration for the video was James Bond.

The video opens with the "gun barrel sequence", characteristic for the James Bond films. In the next scene, Lords is sitting in front of a black background with various images being projected on her naked body. It is a reference to the 1964 film Goldfinger in which opening credit sequence clips of James Bond films are projected on Margaret Nolan's body. Another reference to the film is when Lords is laying naked on the bed with her body painted in gold. Other scenes feature Lords wearing various black latex ensembles driving and walking in the streets of Los Angeles. Several other characters are in the video such as a tarot card reader, man with three nipples, golf player, and magician.

== Track listings and formats ==
- US 12" promo vinyl
1. "Control" (Original Mix) – 6:44
2. "Control" (Overlords House Mix) – 7:21
3. "Control" (SanFrandisco Mix) – 7:17
4. "Control" (DJ EFX SanFrandisco Dub) – 6:02

- US CD Maxi-single
1. "Control" (Olympic 7" Edit) – 3:28
2. "Control" (Original Mix) – 6:44
3. "Control" (Overlords House Mix) – 7:22
4. "Control" (SanFrandisco Mix) – 7:15
5. "Control" (DJ EFX SanFrandisco Dub) – 6:02
6. "Control" (Juno Reactor Instrumental) – 6:28

== Credits and personnel ==
- Traci Lords – vocals, songwriting
- Wonder – songwriting
- Ben Watkins – songwriting, producer
- Juno Reactor – producer
- Gary Kurfirst – executive producer
- Otto the Barbarian – engineer
- Nahoko Maehara – assistant engineer
- Eddy Schreyer – mastering

Credits and personnel adapted from 1000 Fires album liner notes.

== Charts ==
Chart (1995)	Peak position
UK Singles (OCC)	81
UK Club Chart (Music Week)	31
US Hot Dance Club Songs (Billboard)	2
US Hot Dance Music/Maxi-Singles Sales (Billboard)	46
