= Fallen Angel (Traci Lords song) =

Single by Traci Lords

from the album 1000 Fires
- Released: August 3, 1995
- Recorded: 1994
- Genre: Techno; trance; electropop
- Length: 4:58
- Label: Radioactive
- Songwriters: Traci Lords; Ben Watkins; Johann Bley
- Producer: Juno Reactor

Traci Lords singles chronology
| "Control" (1994) | "Fallen Angel" (1995) | "Sunshine" (2004) |

"Fallen Angel" is a song by American singer and actress Traci Lords. It was released on August 3, 1995, by Radioactive Records as the second single from her debut studio album, 1000 Fires (1995). The Paul Oakenfold remix of the song was also featured on the soundtrack to the film Virtuosity (1995), in which Lords appeared. Written by Lords, Ben Watkins and Johann Bley, and produced by Juno Reactor, "Fallen Angel" is an electronic dance song with techno and trance influences. It also contains elements of ambient music and features Spanish guitar and castanets. Lyrically, the song deals with suicide and was inspired by the death of Kurt Cobain.

It received relatively positive reviews from music critics and noted a moderate commercial success, peaking at number eleven on the Billboard Hot Dance Club Songs and number 72 on the UK Singles Chart.

Two music videos for the song were released: one featuring the original version of the song and the footage from the film Virtuosity and other directed by Stéphane Sednaoui featuring the Honeymoon Stitch Mix, produced by Chad Smith and Dave Navarro.

== Background and recording ==
Lords began working on her debut album, 1000 Fires, in the spring of 1994. After collaborating with Tom Bailey and Keith Fernley of the band Babble, Lords wanted to incorporate more dance-oriented music into her record. She was introduced Ben Watkins of Juno Reactor and began working on songs with harder techno-influenced sound. "I got into techno in 1992 when I was working as a model in London. I didn't have much money and I was living with three other girls in this shitty flat above a coffee shop—which was totally depressing—so we used to go to the clubs to escape from it all and that's where I fell in love with the music. I really wanted that influence to come across on my album so when I eventually signed with Radioactive that's what we did."

Lords wrote the lyrics based on the surroundings of Kurt Cobain's death and also used excerpt from her personal journals she wrote as a child. "I've kept personal journals since about the age of nine, and some [lyrics] were actually taken from them; I remember talking to Ben (Watkins) one day about suicide when something struck a chord - I looked back at the journals that I'd written when I was about ten, and the words that I found were the same words that I used in the song, words that I wrote when I was just a child," Lords said.

== Composition ==
"Fallen Angel" (1995)
An up-tempo electronic dance song featuring elements of techno and trance.

"Fallen Angel" electronic dance song. It contains elements of techno and trance as well as ambient music. It features Spanish guitar and castanets within its composition. The song is set in common time, with a tempo of 134 beats per minute. The main lyrical theme of the song is suicide. Lords sings: "You say you wake up in the morning/Feeling used/Like a fallen angel/Tired and bruised".

== Critical reception ==
Billboard noted that "Lords' music career could soar to new levels of visibility with the onset of this jaunty trance anthem, which follows the late - winter club hit 'Control'. Lords is not much of a singer, though she does have attitude and style to spare. She is bolstered by state-of-the-charts grooves, courtesy of Juno Reactor. Added pleasure is derived from stellar post-production by Paul Oakenfold and Johnny Vicious, who take the track down disco and tribal paths, respectively." Andrew Mueller from Melody Maker wrote, "'Fallen Angel' is as admirably big on the self-mythologising pathos front as the title suggests". In a separate review, Melody Maker editor Paul Lester named it Single of the Week, adding, "The obvious single off the album, "Fallen Angel", with its Spanish guitar patterns, clattering, Kraftwerk-perfect rhythm, sampled handclaps, sadder-than-Smiths melody and vague sense of sorrow, recalls Electronic's "Some Distant Memory", the best song of the decade."

Tommy Udo from NME viewed it as "an even more commercial track [than 'Control'] and a more obvious choice for a single". He added that it "has some common ground with some of the more outré material on Madonna's Bedtime Stories and particularly Erotica; it's a fair summary of Lords' sound." DJ Stan from Smash Hits gave it three out of five, writing, "Looks like ex-porn star and sometime singer Traci's been to Ibiza for her hols, because for this choon she's come over all continental, with her maracas, Spanish guitar and lush/hush vocal. Rather rattling and a tad banging!"

== Music videos ==
Lords dancing at an underground rave in the "Fallen Angel" music video

Two different music videos for "Fallen Angel" were released, the first of which used the original version of the song and the second featured the Honeymoon Stitch Mix, produced by Chad Smith and Dave Navarro. The first one was shot during the production of the film Virtuosity (1995) directed by Brett Leonard. It depicts Lords, wearing a skin tight latex ensemble, dancing at an underground rave while being filmed by several camera operators and projected on screens surrounding her. The video utilizes heavy infrared effects.

The second music video was directed by Stéphane Sednaoui. It depicts Lords wearing a red latex dress walking in a hotel room. The main theme of the video is depression and anxiety disorder. It also features close-ups of her outlining her lips with a deep red lipstick.

Notably, the music video was one of the few chosen by Courtney Love to be successfully broadcast on her MTV2 takeover 24 Hours of Love.

== Track listings ==
- UK 12" vinyl
1. "Fallen Angel" (Honeymoon Stitch Mix) – 4:09
2. "Fallen Angel" (Perfecto Mix) – 7:57
3. "Fallen Angel" (Primax Iberian Mix) – 5:04
4. "Fallen Angel" (Muzik Club Vocal) – 8:15
5. "Fallen Angel" (Sexy Perfecto Dub) – 9:06
- Europe/Australia CD Maxi-single
1. "Fallen Angel" (Honeymoon Stich Radio Mix) – 4:03
2. "Fallen Angel" (Perfecto Mix) – 8:00
3. "Fallen Angel" (Muzik Club Vocal Mix) – 8:18
4. "Fallen Angel" (Primax Iberian Mix) – 5:07
5. "Fallen Angel" (Honeymoon Stitch Mix) – 4:53
6. "Fallen Angel" (Original Album Mix) – 4:58
- US 12" vinyl
1. "Fallen Angel" (Perfecto Mix) – 7:58
2. "Fallen Angel" (Honeymoon Stitch Mix) – 4:49
3. "Fallen Angel" (Muzik Club Vocal) – 8:16
4. "Fallen Angel" (Mykonos House Mix) – 10:05
- US CD Maxi-single
1. "Fallen Angel" (Honeymoon Stitch Mix) – 4:50
2. "Fallen Angel" (Perfecto Mix) – 8:00
3. "Fallen Angel" (Muzik Club Vocal) – 8:17
4. "Fallen Angel" (Mykonos House Mix) – 10:05
5. "Fallen Angel" (Sexy Perfecto Dub) – 9:07

== Credits and personnel ==
- Traci Lords – vocals, songwriting
- Juno Reactor – producer, programming
- Ben Watkins – songwriting
- Johann Bley – songwriting
- Gary Kurfirst – executive producer
- Otto The Barbarian – engineer
- Nahako Maehara – assistant engineer
- Raul Vega – photography
- Mark Felt – design
- Stan Endo – design

Credits and personnel adapted from "Fallen Angel" UK 12" single liner notes.

== Charts ==
| Chart (1995) | Peak position |
|---|---|
| UK Singles (OCC) | 72 |
| US Hot Dance Club Songs (Billboard) | 11 |
| Scotland (OCC) | 75 |
