= Enit Festival =

- Genre: Electronic dance music,
- Location: United States
- Years active: 1995-1996
- Founders: Perry Farrell

The Enit Festival was a one-night electronic music festival created by Perry Farrell in 1995. Originally created as an after party for Lollapalooza, Farrell tried to take the space based festival on the road after minimal success. The name is derived from Ludwig Pallman's book "Cancer Planet Mission". According to early ads for the festival, it was described as "an inter-planetary festival celebrating cosmic peace and sexuality."

== Enit events ==
The festival, like Lollapalooza, was a traveling tour and visited cities such as Dallas, San Francisco, Los Angeles, Camden, Phoenix and Holmdel. Enit was generally held outdoors and consisted of multiple stages as well as several "rooms." Each room would explore different realms, such as a room each for sexuality, psychedelia, and art. In the room for sexuality, there would often be painted naked or half-naked women walking around or dancing under neon lights and heavy electronic music. As for the psychedelic and art rooms there would be paintings or still-models posing in a room reminiscent of an acid trip. On the main stage, acts such as Porno for Pyros, Black Grape, Sun Ra Arkestra, the Rebirth Brass Band, Meat Beat Manifesto, Lady Miss Kier and various DJs, such as Andrew Weatherall, would play music through the entire night. At one point in the night, Farrell and a local conservationist group would hold a tree planting ceremony that everyone attending could join in giving back to the earth. Enit also provided a free vegetarian meal to all attendees.

== Success & decline ==
As more fans experienced the bizarre festival for themselves, many strayed away from its unstable and poorly structured event. Geared towards a younger crowd, the festival saw a dramatic drop in attendance. In 1996, due to a combination of high production costs and a lack of fanbase, the festival called it quits.

== See also ==
- List of electronic music festivals
