= Single Cell Orchestra =

American ambient musician

Single Cell Orchestra is the performing name of Miguel Angelo Fierro, a San Francisco-born musician who has worked for many years in the electronic music scene. His first successful single was "Transmit Liberation", an underground ambient music hit that proved influential in the development of trip hop. His first full-length release was Dead Vent 7 (1995), followed by Single Cell Orchestra (1996). Later that year, he collaborated with the band Freaky Chakra to release an album entitled Freaky Chakra vs Single Cell Orchestra.
