= British Press Awards 2006 =

The British Press Awards is an annual ceremony that has celebrated the best of British journalism since the 1970s. A financially lucrative part of the Press Gazette's business, they have been described as "the Oscars of British journalism", or less flatteringly, "The Hackademy Awards".

The British Press Awards 2006 were held at The Dorchester, Park Lane, London, on Monday 20 March 2006. Channel 4 News presenter Jon Snow hosted the revamped ceremony with just 450 guests attending compared with more than 900 in previous years. There were 21 categories with a single overall sponsor rather than the 28 categories with individual sponsors of 2005.

The judging process has two stages with Charles Wilson as Chairman of the Judges. The first stage chooses five entries (or six in case of a tie for fifth place) for the shortlists of each category and the second stage determines the winners. The Supplement of the Year, Cartoonist of the Year and Front Page of the Year categories are judged by independent panels of experts. Newspaper of the Year is now judged on an academy-style voting system. The judging forum comprises 80 senior staff journalists and a Grand Jury of 20 non-affiliated senior media executives representing each of the national newspaper groups.

== Controversy leading up to the 2006 awards ==
Soon after the 2005 awards, ten editors of major newspapers released a joint statement announcing their boycott because of the 'decline in conduct and prestige'. The statement read, "The editors of The Guardian, The Observer, The Daily Telegraph, the Sunday Telegraph, The Independent, the Independent on Sunday, the Daily Express, the Sunday Express, the Daily Mail, and The Mail on Sunday believe the organisation of these awards brings little credit to the industry or to the newspapers who win them". The New York Times's London correspondent wrote, "last night's ceremony — a mind-numbing parade of awards in 28 categories — was not a mutually respectful celebration of the British newspaper industry fuelled by camaraderie and bonhomie. It was more like a soccer match attended by a club of misanthropic inebriates". Piers Morgan, unhappy about losing the Hugh Cudlipp Award to The Sun, launched “The REAL Newspaper of the Year Awards”, inviting Mirror readers to phone in their choice.

Still choosing to boycott the 2006 event were Associated Newspapers (part of Daily Mail and General Trust plc), Telegraph Group (part of Press Holdings Limited) and Express Newspapers (part of Northern & Shell). Their titles include The Daily Telegraph and Sunday Telegraph, the Daily Mail and the Mail on Sunday, the Daily Express and the Sunday Express, the Daily Star, the London Evening Standard and Metro, though the Express Group's boycott started when it was bought by Richard Desmond in 2000.

One of the concerns is over the new owners of Press Gazette, the organisation behind the awards, Piers Morgan and Matthew Freud. The neutrality of Freud has been questioned given his marriage to Rupert Murdoch's daughter and his PR business's deals with News International. However, to reconcile his critics, Matthew Freud has appointed a new Chairman of the Judges, Charles Wilson, and implemented changes to the judging process to promote transparency and fairness. Now there are only 21 awards, none of which are privately sponsored, and the ceremony is earlier in the evening so as to encourage sobriety. Simon Kelner, editor of The Independent, said that "a lot of the concerns I had with the organisation of the awards have been addressed. Anyway, there's not a viable alternative".

Simon Lewis, corporate affairs director at Vodafone, the new sponsor, says, "We are delighted to be able to work with Press Gazette to celebrate the best of British journalism," despite the fact that his brother Will Lewis, deputy editor of The Daily Telegraph, is boycotting the awards.

== Category shortlists ==
The following lists the shortlists published February 26, 2006.

(Winner in bold) (Blue numbered boxes to the right of the nominations contain external links to relevant web pages)

=== National Newspaper of the Year ===
- **The Guardian**
- The Independent
- News of the World
- The Observer
- The Times

=== Reporter of the Year ===
- **Oliver Harvey** (The Sun)
- Felicity Lawrence (The Guardian)
- Stephen Moyes (Daily Mirror)
- Andrew Norfolk (The Times)
- Nicholas Timmins (Financial Times)

=== Foreign Reporter of the Year ===
- Ghaith Abdul-Ahad (The Guardian)
- Patrick Cockburn (The Independent)
- **Hala Jaber** (The Sunday Times)
- Richard Lloyd Parry (The Times)
- Jonathan Watts (The Guardian)

=== Scoop of the Year ===
- Francis Elliott (Independent on Sunday) "Blunkett broke Rules"
- Jamie Pyatt (The Sun) "Harry the Nazi"
- Robert Jobson (Freelance/Evening Standard) "Charles & Camilla to wed"
- **Stephen Moyes (Daily Mirror) "Cocaine Kate"**
- Michael Smith (The Sunday Times) "Blair - War leak"

=== Columnist of the Year ===
- Jeremy Clarkson (The Sunday Times)
- Anatole Kaletsky (The Times)
- **Lucy Kellaway** (Financial Times)
- George Monbiot (The Guardian)
- Jane Moore (The Sun)
- Tony Parsons (Daily Mirror)

=== Political Journalist of the Year ===
- **Francis Elliott** (Independent on Sunday)
- Daniel Finkelstein (The Times)
- Alice Miles (The Times)
- Andrew Rawnsley (The Observer)
- Philip Stephens (Financial Times)

=== Feature Writer of the Year ===
- **Bryan Appleyard** (The Sunday Times magazine)
- Adrian Levy / Cathy Scott Clarke (The Guardian)
- Malcolm Macalister Hall (The Independent)
- Stefanie Marsh (The Times)
- Michael Tierney (The Herald)

=== Interviewer of the Year ===
- Lynn Barber (The Observer)
- Emma Brockes (The Guardian)
- Robert Chalmers (Independent on Sunday)
- **Rachel Cooke** (The Observer)
- Deborah Ross (The Independent)
- Janice Turner (The Times)

=== Specialist Writer of the Year ===
- Steve Connor (The Independent)
- John Cornwell (The Sunday Times)
- Richard Girling (The Sunday Times)
- Tom Newton Dunn (The Sun)
- **Michael Smith** (The Sunday Times)

=== Critic of the Year ===
- Charlie Brooker (The Guardian)
- AA Gill (The Sunday Times)
- Ian Hyland (News of the World)
- Waldemar Januszczak (The Sunday Times)
- **Jay Rayner** (The Observer)

=== Sports Journalist of the Year ===
- Rob Beasley (News of the World)
- **Oliver Holt** (Daily Mirror)
- Jamie Jackson (The Observer)
- Paul Kimmage (The Sunday Times)
- James Lawton (The Independent)

=== Young Journalist of the Year ===
- **Lucy Bannerman** (The Herald)
- Steve Bloomfield (Independent on Sunday)
- Gemma Calvert (News of the World)
- Giles Hattersley (The Sunday Times)
- Katharine Hibbert (The Sunday Times)

=== Team of the Year ===
- The Art Newspaper (Sheikh Saud - biggest art collector)
- **Daily Mirror** (7/7 team)
- The Guardian (Attack on London)
- The Independent (7/7 team)
- The Sun (7/7 team)
- The Sunday Times (Nature's time bomb - Asian tsunami)

=== Business & Finance Journalist of the Year ===
- John Gapper (Financial Times)
- Ian Griffiths (The Guardian)
- Michael Harrison (The Independent)
- **Hamish McRae** (The Independent)
- Patience Wheatcroft (The Times)

=== Supplement of the Year ===
- How to Spend It (Financial Times)
- **Observer Food Monthly (The Observer)**
- Celebs (Sunday Mirror)
- Culture (The Sunday Times)
- Times Magazine (The Times)

=== Front Page of the Year ===
- Cocaine Kate (Daily Mirror)
- Best on his Deathbed (News of the World)
- The Final Farewell (The Observer)
- **Harry the Nazi (The Sun)**
- 7/7 (The Times)

=== Photographer of the Year ===
- Martin Argles (The Guardian)
- Charlie Bibby (Financial Times)
- Brian Griffin (The Sunday Times Magazine)
- Sean Smith (The Guardian)
- **Edmond Terakopian** (Freelance)

=== Sports Photographer of the Year ===
- David Ashdown
- Marc Aspland (The Times)
- **Tom Jenkins** (The Guardian)
- Colin Mearns (The Herald)
- Hugh Routledge (The Sunday Times)

=== Cartoonist of the Year ===
- Peter Brookes (The Times)
- Dave Brown (The Independent)
- Nick Newman (The Sunday Times)
- Ingram Pinn (Financial Times)
- **Gerald Scarfe** (The Sunday Times)

=== Showbusiness Writer of the Year ===
- Jane Atkinson (News of the World)
- Anthony Barnes (Independent on Sunday)
- Caroline Hedley (Daily Mirror)
- **Victoria Newton** (The Sun)
- Rav Singh (News of the World)
- Phil Taylor (News of the World)

=== The Hugh Cudlipp Award ===
The following shortlist for the Cudlipp Award was later.

- Making Poverty History - A Year in Rwanda (Daily Mirror)
- Charles & Camilla to Wed (Evening Standard)
- London Bombings (News of the World)
- What about the Victims? (News of the World)
- Animal Cruelty (The Sun)
- One Last Chance (The Sun)
