= Finchley Catholic High School =

Boys' secondary school in London, England

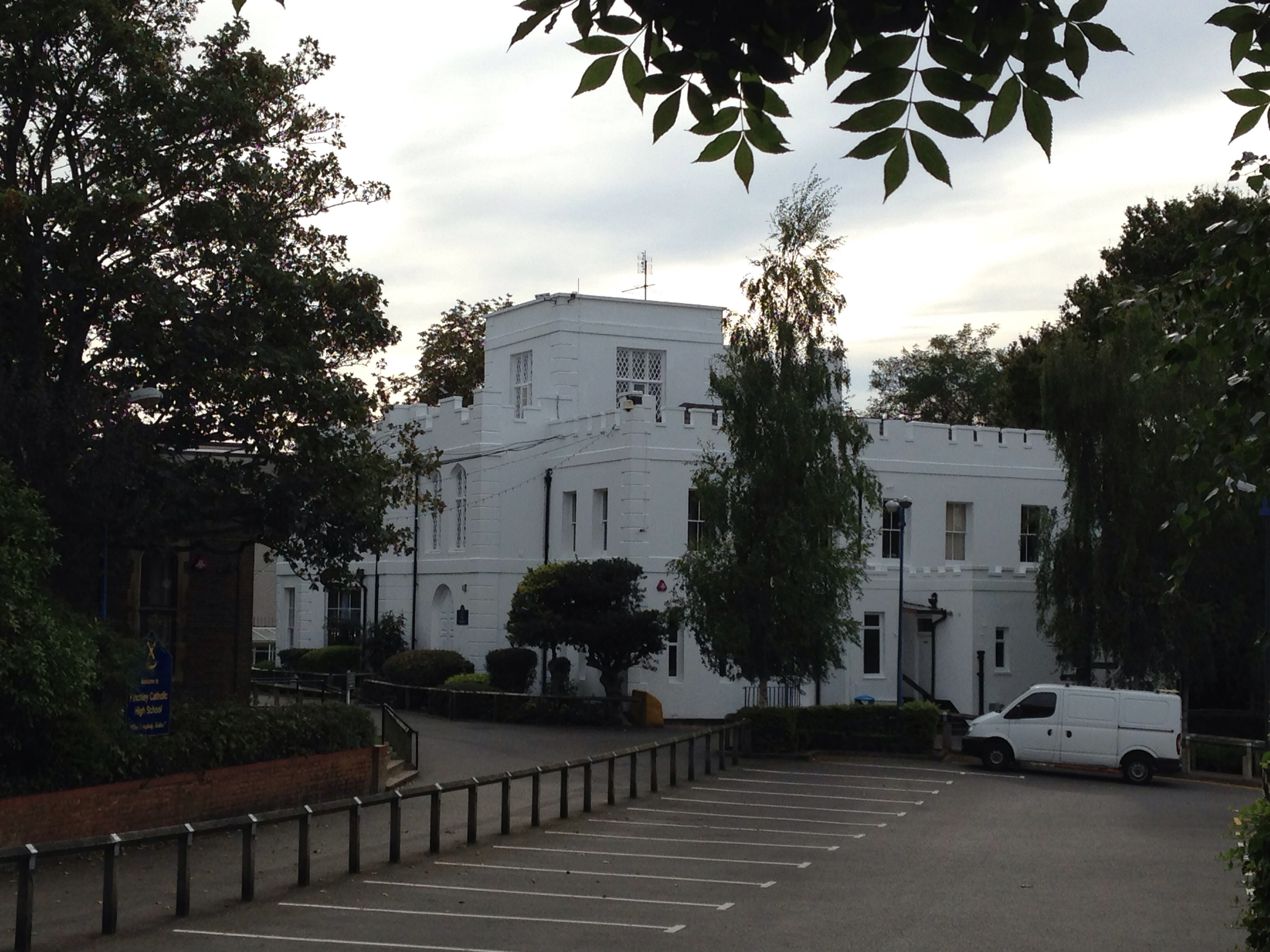

Location
- Woodside Lane; North Finchley, Greater London, N12 8TA; England; 51°37′19″N 0°10′55″W

Information
- Type: Voluntary aided school
- Motto: Latin: Da Nobis Recta Sapere (Grant that we may be truly wise)
- Religious affiliation: Roman Catholic
- Established: 1926
- Founder: C. H. Parsons
- Local authority: Barnet
- Department for Education URN: 101362 Tables
- Ofsted: Reports
- Headmaster: Ciran Stapleton
- Gender: Boys (mixed-sex 6th form)
- Age: 11 to 18
- Enrolment: 1124
- Publication: The Albanian
- Former names: Finchley Grammar School; Challoner School
- Website: http://www.finchleycatholic.org.uk

Finchley Catholic High School is a boys' secondary school with a coeducational sixth form in North Finchley, part of the London Borough of Barnet, England & the diocese of Westminster (Roman Catholic Church). The current head teacher is Ciran Stapleton.

== Admissions ==
Finchley Catholic High School is a faith school; it is also – up to the end of year 11 – exclusively for boys.

It has a coeducational sixth form. The sixth form has been coeducational since the 2007–08 academic year.

== Location ==
The school is situated to the west of Finchley's High Road (A1000), and immediately to the east of that stretch of the Northern Line which constitutes the school's western boundary. Lying adjacent to the postcode boundaries of Whetstone (N20) and Woodside Park (N12), it is roughly halfway between Woodside Park and Totteridge & Whetstone Underground stations.

== History ==
Finchley Catholic Grammar School was founded in 1926 by Clement Henry Parsons (1892–1980), parish priest of St. Alban's Catholic Church, Nether Street, North Finchley. He founded the Challoner School (a fee-paying grammar school for boys who had not passed their 11+); as well as St. Alban's Catholic Preparatory School ("The Prep" – now absorbed into Woodside Park International School) as a feeder primary for the Grammar and Challoner schools. 1971 saw its two institutional forebears, Finchley Catholic Grammar School ("Finchley Grammar") and the Challoner School, merge to become Finchley Catholic High School. It was the sister school of the all-girls St. Michael's Catholic Grammar School during the grammar school era.

== Traditions ==
Its motto, Da Nobis Recta Sapere (Grant that we may be truly wise) comes from the collect (opening prayer) of the Mass of Pentecost. The school newsletter, "The Albanian", is named after the school's patron saint, St Alban, Britain's protomartyr. It is sent out multiple times a year (often each half term) to all parents, governors and other key members of the school community.

== Ethos ==
The school has a Catholic ethos. Religious education is taught five times a fortnight in Key Stage 3 (years 7, 8 and 9); and, as in all Catholic schools in England, the GCSE is compulsory (Key Stage 4 – years 10 and 11), being taught five times a fortnight.

== Sport ==
Facilities include a recently installed full-size astroturf pitch and playing fields in nearby Southover, a street in Woodside Park Garden Suburb, on the other side of Dollis Brook. Of particular note was the archery club. From 1965 until 1972, they were undefeated in interschool competition.

On 26 April 2018, Finchley's year 10 football team qualified for the ESFA U15 National Cup Final, overcoming Carshalton Sports College 3–1 in the Semi-final. Goals scored by Luke Ainsworth, Luke Traynor and Louis Setoudeh were enough to take the school through to the first National Cup Final in the school's history. The school played St Francis Xavier's College from Liverpool in the final at the Madjeski Stadium (Reading) on 22 May 2018.

The same team that got to the ESFA U15 National Cup Final also won the Middlesex county cup three years in a row, making it the first time in the history of the Middlesex cup that it had happened, their third Middlesex county cup win is most known thanks to Ehimen Osebore doing the Milly Rock as a goal celebration.

== Music and drama ==
The show "Remember", written by Mark Sell and Lena Santos, was performed by students of FCHS and St. Michael's. It is about the remembrance of the Holocaust, and has been to Poland, where it was the first-ever performance in the Auschwitz camp itself. Music includes partisan music and other music with Yiddish and Hebrew lyrics.

== Science and engineering ==
The school offers a government-funded engineering club to Key Stage 3. It is currently working on making a green energy supply to run an oxygenating system for the school pond, in the form of a wind turbine.

== Languages ==
French or Spanish are compulsory throughout Key Stage 3, and optional at GCSE. French is also taught up to A2 level. There are after-school lessons in Latin, which is available up to GCSE (no longer available).

== School buildings ==
The school's buildings vary in age and quality:

- The 'White House', built in 1872 by Cubitt, is the school's oldest building. Grade II listed, it houses the school's reception, main offices, a small oratory and student services.
- The Bourne Block, completed in 1936, is the largest building and houses most of the classrooms, as well as the former Sixth Form common room (now a staff room) and a business and MfL centre.
- The Challoner Block, completed in 1954, originally housed the separate Challoner School, until it became part of FCHS in 1971. It contains the second largest number of classrooms.
- Bampfield House, a private residence built before 1920, was acquired in the early 1950s as a dormitory block for the Challoner School. FCHS used it as a music and drama centre until the construction of the Performing Arts Centre (see below). It was demolished in 2013 and is now home to the Canon Parsons Sixth Form Centre, which opened in 2014
- The School Hall, built in 1956 and originally used solely as a chapel, now functions as an assembly hall.
- The Fisher Block, also known as the '1971 Block', houses the ICT and art rooms, a library and the recently renovated canteen.
- The Bampfield Performing Arts Centre, built in 2004 and opened by local girl Emma Bunton ("Baby Spice"), replaced Bampfield House as a multi-purpose music and drama centre, including three music rooms and a drama studio.
- Canon Parsons Sixth Form Centre built in 2014 and opened by Bishop John Sherrington it cost £3 million to build. It replaced the former music and drama centre, Bampfield House.

There are two other buildings of note.

- Challoner Lodge (originally 'Feckenham Lodge'), built around 1930 as a kind of dower house for the founder's aged mother, is now the school keeper's residence.
- Parsons Lodge, originally the coachman's lodge for the 'White House' and also Grade II listed, was recently renovated, including structural underpinning.

== School houses ==
The school is made up of 6 houses, which are represented by each year's form classes, which in turn are represented by the colour of stripes on their ties. These are named after prominent Catholics (mostly with some personal connection to Finchley): Bampfield (green), Bourne (blue), Feckenham (gold), Fisher (white), Challoner (red), More (purple) and Alban (orange). Orange is not always included, but sometimes another form is made to accommodate more pupils, typically every other year.

The forms (houses) each have their own letter, which together make up the initials of the school. This is FRCHSB, standing for Finchley Roman Catholic High School for Boys, and each letter is for a different form.

At the beginning of the 2006–07 school year, another tie colour, orange, was introduced due to a complication about the number of pupils admitted that year. This was later removed for the lower school in 2014.

As stated by the school:

- F(inchley) is Green Tie. Bampfield
- R(oman) is Blue Tie. Bourne
- C(atholic) is Gold Tie (often referred to as Yellow – Yellow and Gold being heraldically equivalent). Feckenham
- H(igh) is White Tie. Fisher
- S(chool) is Red Tie. Challoner
- B(oys) is Purple Tie. More
- A(ttendance) is Orange tie

For some lessons, classes partner up with another one:

- For design technology
- For performing arts
- For foreign language classes, the classes are split with three forms learning French and the other three forms learning Spanish

== Notable old boys ==
- Declan Danaher, former rugby player, back row London Irish
- Tony Gallagher, former editor of The Sun and The Daily Telegraph, now deputy editor The Times
- Giuliano Grazioli, former striker for Swindon Town and Barnet
- Martin Ivens, former editor, The Sunday Times
- Dennis Kelly, theatre and television writer
- Paul Rincon, BBC News, broadcast journalist, specialist in science & technology
- Christian Maghoma, DR Congo international footballer
- RV (rapper) British rapper and songwriter
- Pelly Ruddock Mpanzu, Professional footballer best known for being the first player to play in every league from Non-League football to the Premier League with Luton Town and DR Congo international footballer

=== Finchley Grammar School ===
- Aidan Bellenger OSB (born 1950), former Abbot of Downside Abbey
- Christopher Bliss, Nuffield Professor of International Economics from 1992 to 2007 at the University of Oxford, and brother of Jill Paton Walsh
- Air Vice-Marshal Robert Chapple, Principal Medical Officer of the RAF from 1991 to 1994
- Terry Forrestal, stuntman base jumper; former soldier
- Michael Gorman, librarian, writer & lecturer
- Sir John Hegarty, founder of global advertising agency Bartle Bogle Hegarty
- Jerry Lordan, composer of hits Apache and Wonderful Land for The Shadows
- Troy Kennedy Martin, screenwriter; co-creator of 1960s British TV hit series Z-Cars, scripted 1960s classic The Italian Job
- John Leslie Marshall, Conservative former MEP for London North and former mayor of Barnet London Borough Council
- Eric Merriman, radio comedy writer
- Nicholas J. Phillips, UK hologram pioneer
- Alan Rayment, first-class cricketer
- Sir Hugh Rossi, Conservative MP for Hornsey, then Hornsey and Wood Green, 1966–92
