= List of Azusa Pacific University people =

Azusa Pacific University has graduated numerous notable alumni, including actors, athletes, entertainers, Olympians, and prominent pastors.

Name	Class year	Notability	References
Baked Alaska	2006	Internet personality	
Christopher Asher	M.Ed. in Physical Education	NCAA track and field coach	
Colleen Ballinger	2008	YouTube personality "Miranda Sings", star of Netflix show Haters Back Off, and Dawn in Waitress on Broadway	
Dan Barker	1970	Renowned atheist	
Doug Barnett	1982	NFL player	
Susan Bonilla	1982, BA in English	Politician	
Susan Borrego	1989	Chancellor of University of Michigan- Flint	
Darlene Caamaño	1997	President of NALA Films, producer	
Dave Canales	2003	Head coach of the Carolina Panthers	
Tracee Carrasco		Fox Business Network reporter	
Vivian Chukwuemeka	2006	2008 Olympian, Nigeria, shot put and discus	
Bryan Clay	2002	2004 Olympic silver medalist, decathlon; 2008 Olympic gold medalist	
Steve Connor	1985	Founder of Sports Outreach, author, speaker, former NFL player	
Tony Corrente	1988	NFL referee	
Kevin Daley		Harlem Globetrotter	
Spencer Danielson	2012	Head football coach at Boise State University	
Hailemariam Desalegn	2000 MA in Organizational Leadership	Prime minister of Ethiopia	
Marcie Dodd	2001	Actress: Wicked LA and Broadway cast member	
Eugenio Duarte	2005	General superintendent of Church of Nazarene	
Innocent Egbunike	1986	Olympic runner; 2008 track & field coach, Nigerian Olympic team	
Rick Elias	1977	Singer, songwriter, actor, record producer; founding member of Rich Mullins Ragamuffin Band, Rick Elias and The Confessions	
Julie Ertel	1999, M.Ed. in Physical Education	2000 Olympic gold medalist, water polo; 2008 Olympic triathlete	
Jim Eyen	1984, M.Ed.	Veteran NBA assistant coach, Los Angeles Lakers assistant coach	
Davidson Ezinwa	1994	Olympic runner	
Osmond Ezinwa	1994	Olympic runner	
Malynda Hale	2007	Singer, songwriter, actress	
Jack W. Hayford	1970	Founder, the Church on the Way	
Steve Hindalong	1981	Songwriter, producer	
James "The Sandman" Irvin	2001	MMA fighter	
David A. Johnson	1986 and 2003; M.A. Ed.: Special Education	Decathlon; 2002 Olympic bronze medalist	
Derric Johnson	Biblical Theology, Music	Conductor, Composer, Author	
Kristina Knickerbocker	2014	U.S. Representative, as of 2027, from Ohio	
Daniel M. Lavery		Writer and satirist	
Steven Lenhart	2008	Forward for the San Jose Earthquakes of Major League Soccer	
John F. MacArthur, Jr.	1961	Senior pastor of Grace Community Church, president of the Master's College Santa Clarita, CA	
Scheana Marie	2007	Cast member, Vanderpump Rules	
John C. Maxwell	1989; M.Div.	Leadership coach and writer	
Miles McPherson	1991; M.Div.	Senior pastor of the Rock Church, San Diego	
Pilipo Miriye	1982	First Evangelical missionary from Papua New Guinea to Nigeria, W. Africa	
Ruben Niebla	1997	Pitching coach in Cleveland Indians Farm System, former MLB pitcher	
Kirk Nieuwenhuis	2008	Major League Baseball player	
Austin O'Brien	2004	Actor	
Christian Okoye	1987	Former NFL player (1987–1992)	
Jean d'Orléans	1994; M.B.A.	Head of the House of Orléans, Orléanist pretender to the French throne	
Matt Orzech	2019	American football long snapper for the Green Bay Packers	
Steve Patterson	2006	TV and radio host	
Jeff Robinson	1984	Former MLB pitcher	
Blanca Rubio	1999, 2003; B.A in Business / M of Education	Politician	
Jackie Slater	2013; M.A. in Organizational Leadership	NFL Hall of Fame offensive lineman	
Mark Speckman	1977	Assistant head football coach at UC Davis	
Jed Stugart	1994	Head football coach at Lindenwood University	
Stephen Vogt	2007	Catcher for the Oakland A’s, San Francisco Giants	
Terrell Watson	2015	American football running back for the San Diego Fleet	
John Wimber	1974	Founder of Vineyard Church	
Regina Zernay	1993	Bass player in Cowboy Mouth	

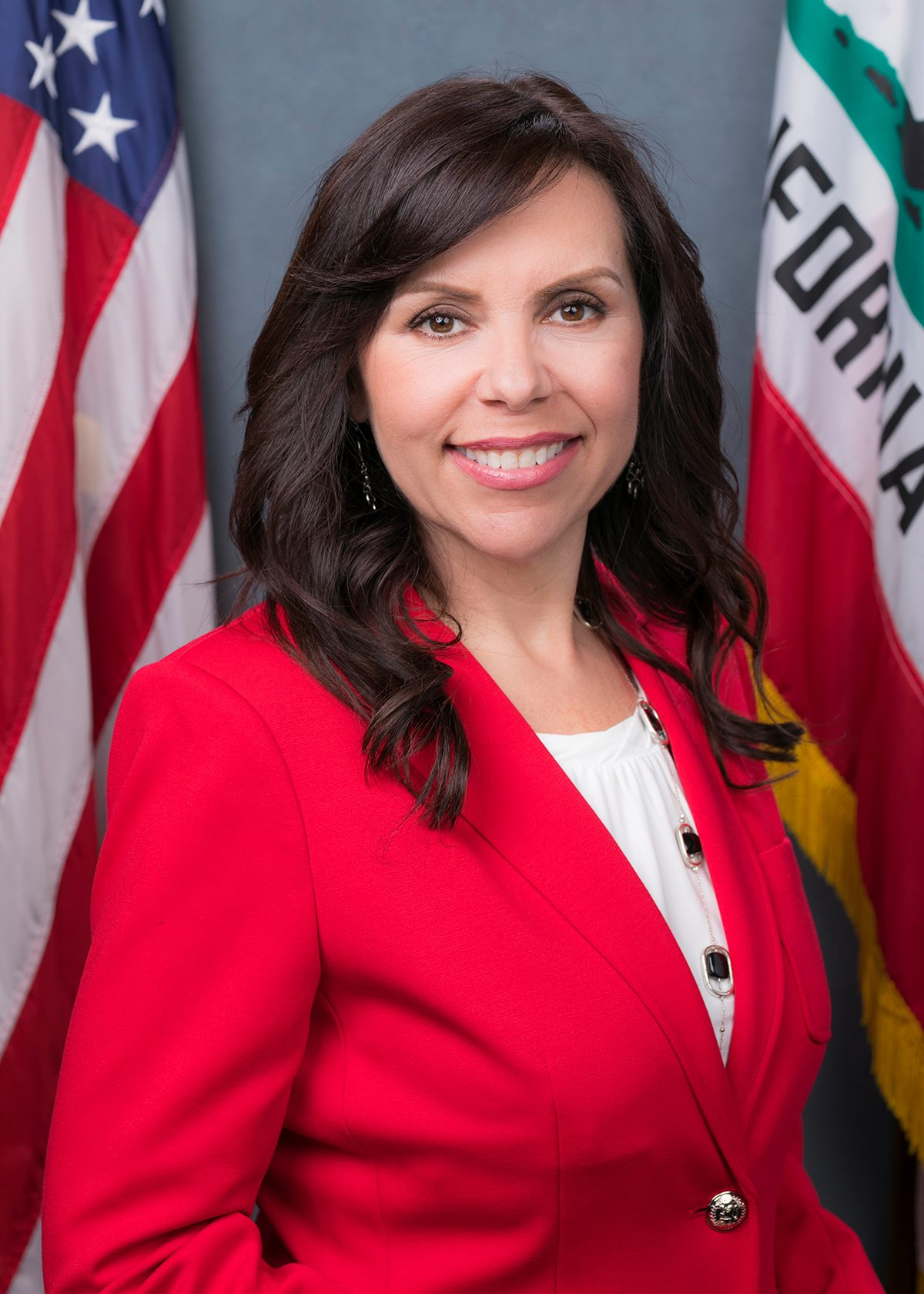
Blanca Rubio, serving in the California State Assembly

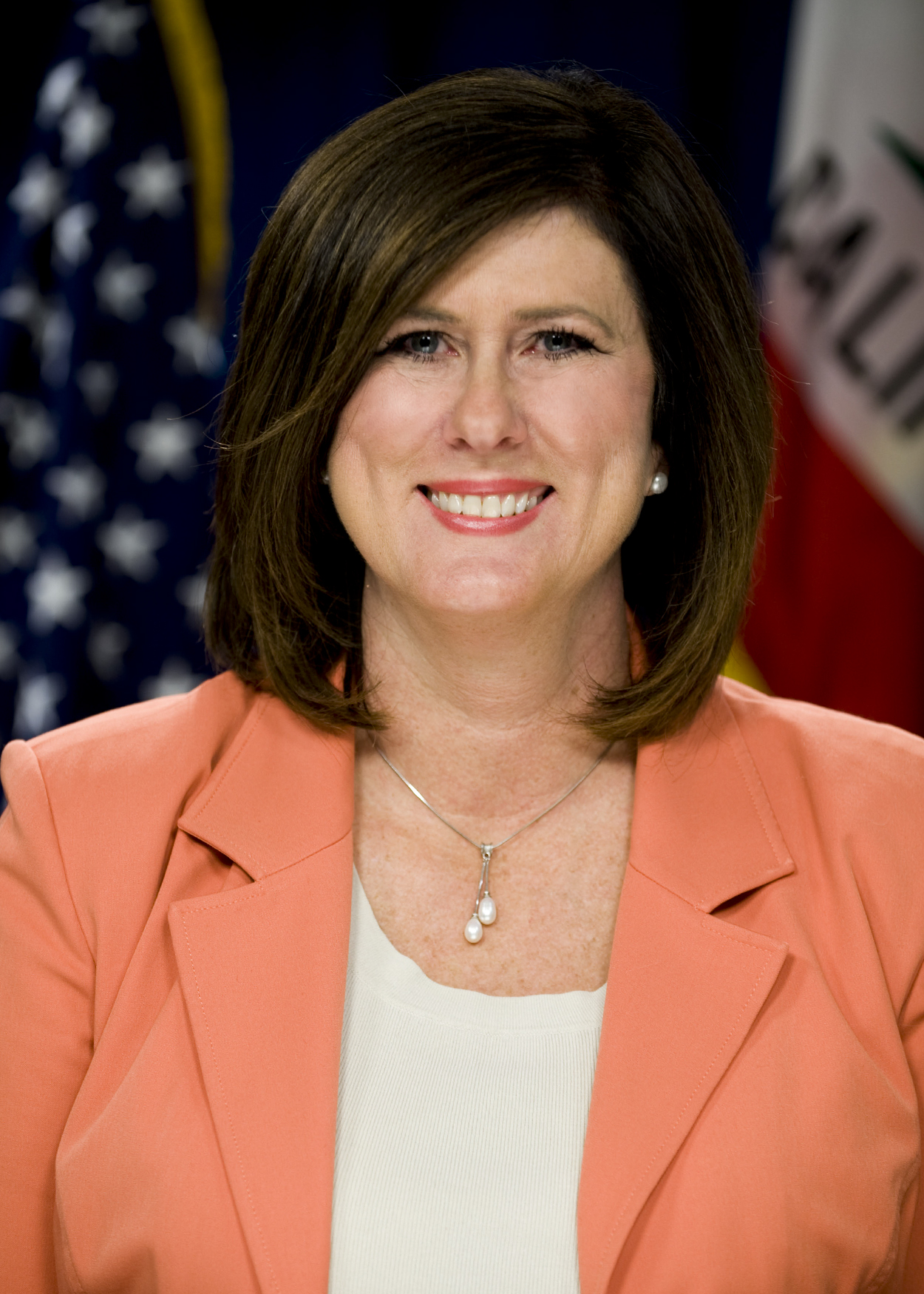
Susan Bonilla, serving in the California State Assembly

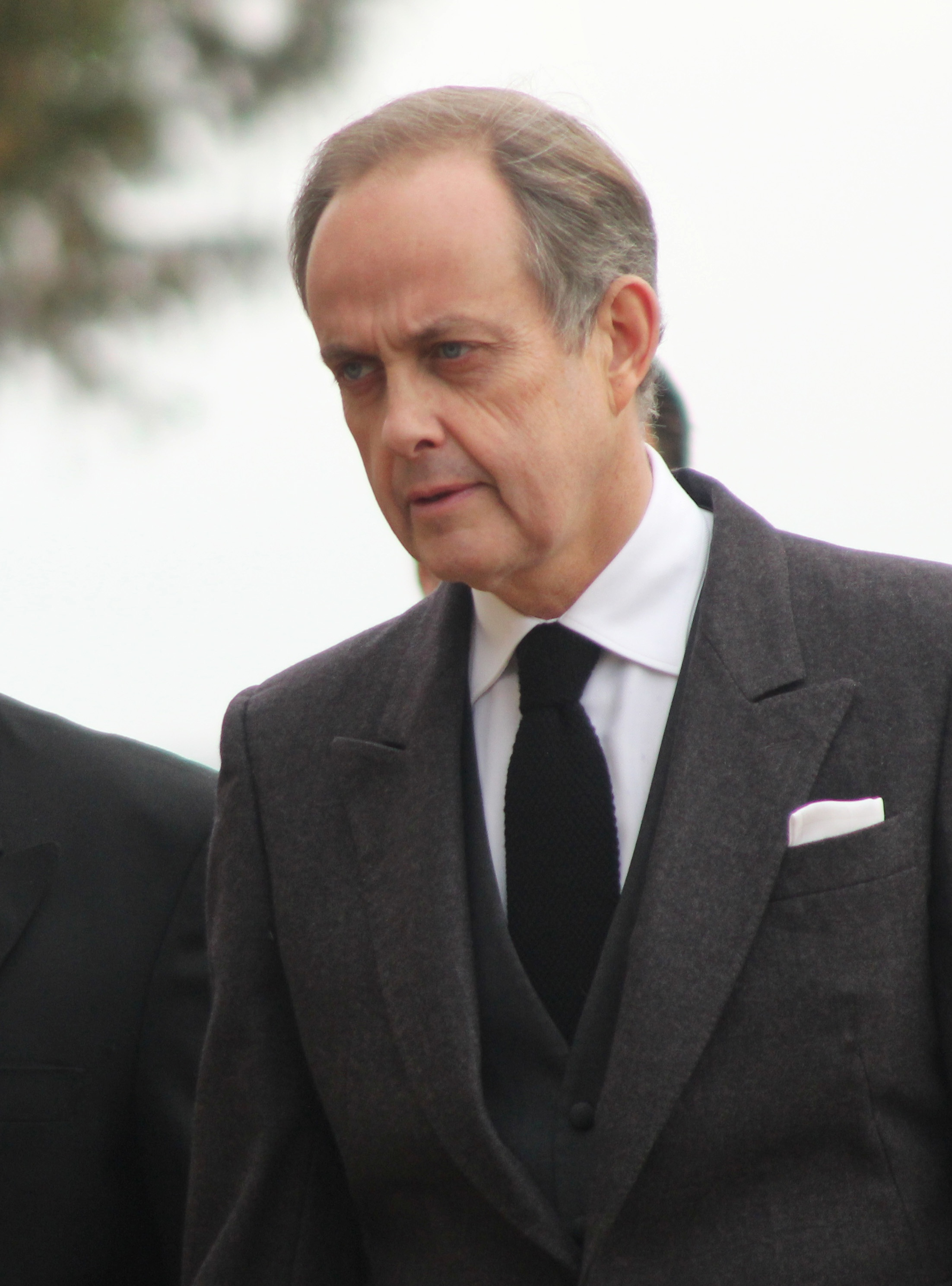
Jean, Count of Paris, Orléanist pretender to the French throne as Jean IV
