= Emma Tucker =

English journalist

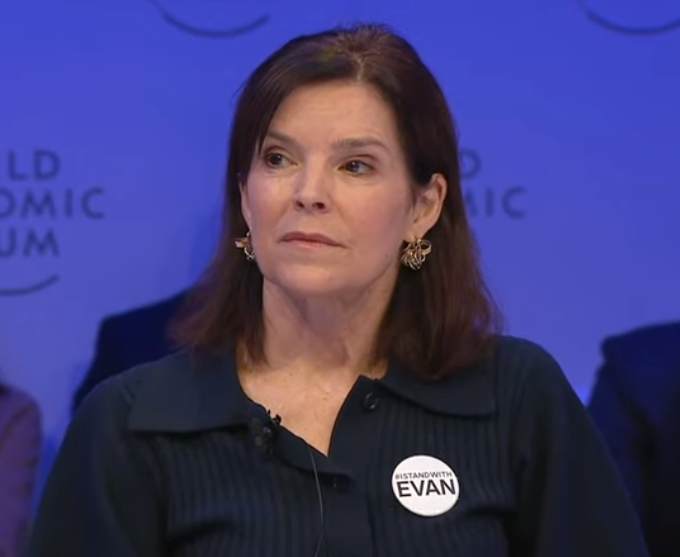
- Tucker in 2024
- Born: 24 October 1966 (age 60); London, England
- Education: University College, Oxford
- Occupations: Editor-in-chief, The Wall Street Journal
- Children: 3

Emma Jane Tucker (born 24 October 1966) is an English journalist and editor-in-chief of The Wall Street Journal, where she is the first woman to lead the publication. She was previously the editor of The Sunday Times, and a deputy editor of The Times.

== Early life ==
Tucker was born on 24 October 1966 in London, England, the daughter of Nicholas Tucker and Jacqueline Anthony. She attended Wallands School and Priory School in Lewes, East Sussex. She applied for the United World College of the Atlantic in Wales, and was invited for an interview, where she was offered an opportunity to study at the Armand Hammer United World College of the American West (UWC-USA) in San Miguel County, New Mexico, US. She won a scholarship, and attended the school from the age of 16 in 1983 until 1985. She later said "I was very homesick to begin with, but I had an incredible two years there. It was a complete change of pace, life, outlook, everything". She then read PPE at University College, Oxford.

== Career ==
In 1990, Tucker became a graduate trainee at the Financial Times (FT). She worked in the House of Commons press gallery, and wrote the money markets column. She worked in the newspaper's economics room at the time of the ERM crisis. She later said, "they [the FT] were slightly baffled ... because they hadn't got many young women".

Tucker was posted to Brussels from 1994 to 2000, where she covered the European Union in her first foreign correspondent job. In January 2000 she moved to Berlin and was a foreign correspondent in Germany for three years. She applied to become property editor of the Financial Times, and moved to features. She became editor of Financial Times Weekend.

Tucker joined The Times in 2007 as associate features editor and a year later became editor of Times2. In 2012 she became The Times' editorial director. In October 2013 she was appointed deputy editor, under editor John Witherow, succeeding Keith Blackmore who had stood down that August.

At the end of January 2020, Tucker became the first female editor of The Sunday Times since Rachel Beer in 1901. During Tucker's tenure as editor, the newspaper reported on controversies regarding COVID-19 contracts.

In December 2022, she was named the new editor of The Wall Street Journal, "the first woman to lead the 133-year-old business publication," replacing Matt Murray on February 1, 2023.

== Personal life ==
Tucker has three sons, including one born in February 2001. They lived in Lewes, East Sussex. Tucker divorced her first husband and moved to London. In 2008, she then married her second husband, Peter Andreas Howarth, who already had three sons.

She lives on the Upper West Side neighborhood of Manhattan in New York City.

Media offices
Preceded by Keith Blackmore	Deputy Editor of The Times; 2013–2020	Succeeded by Tony Gallagher
Preceded by Martin Ivens	Editor of The Sunday Times; 2020–2023	Succeeded by Ben Taylor
Preceded by Matt Murray	Editor of The Wall Street Journal; 2023–present	Incumbent
