= Aspland =

Aspland is a surname of English origin. Notable people with the surname include:

- Marc Aspland, British sports photographer
- Robert Aspland (1782–1845), English Unitarian minister, editor and activist
- Robert Brook Aspland (1805–1869), English Unitarian minister and editor; son of Robert Aspland

== See also ==
- Aspland Island, South Shetland Islands, Antarctica
