= Fudan University School of Journalism =

Department of Fudan University, China

- 复旦大学新闻学院
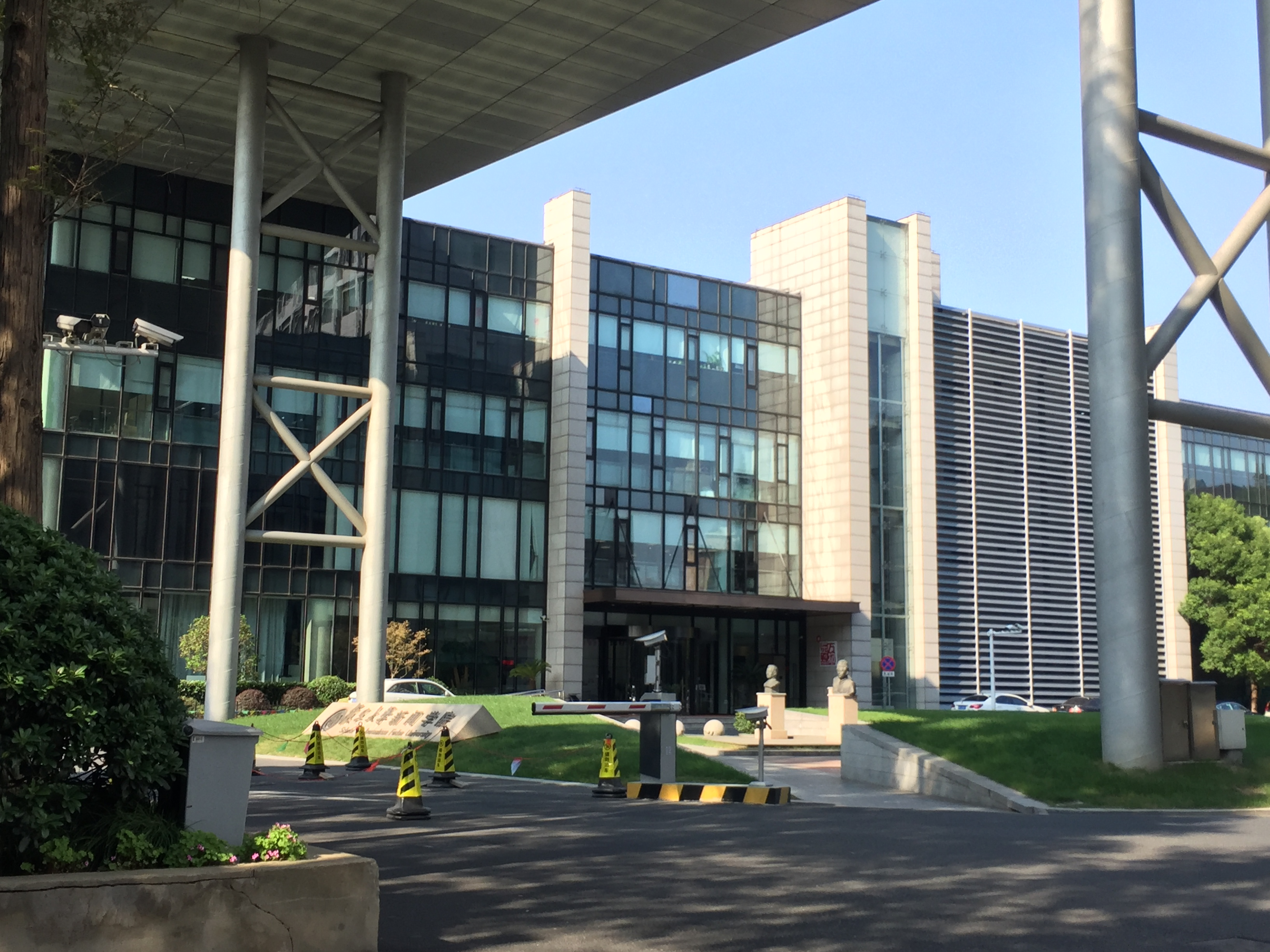
- The School of Journalism of Fudan University
- Type: Journalism school
- Established: September 1929 (Department of Journalism); 10 June 1988 (School of Journalism)
- Parent institution: Fudan University
- Dean: Song Chao
- Academic staff: 70
- Students: 1500
- Undergraduates: 720
- Postgraduates: 250
- Doctoral students: 80
- Location: Shanghai, China
- Campus: Handan Campus, Yangpu District
- Website: www.xwxy.fudan.edu.cn

The Fudan University School of Journalism (Chinese: 复旦大学新闻学院) is a constituent school of Fudan University in Shanghai, China. The school originated as the Department of Journalism, established in September 1929, and was reorganized as the School of Journalism in 1988.

According to national discipline evaluations, the school is among the leading institutions for journalism and communication studies in mainland China. Chinese media have described the school as a "cradle of journalists".

== History ==
In September 1929, Fudan University reorganized its academic structure in accordance with national university regulations then in force. The former Department of Chinese Literature was divided into the Department of Chinese Literature and the Department of Journalism, marking the formal establishment of the Department of Journalism.

The department's first chair was Xie Liuyi, a graduate of Waseda University, who had joined Fudan University in 1926. Xie drafted the department's founding charter and outlined its educational philosophy, emphasizing the cultivation of journalists with literary training and social responsibility.

In 1932, following the establishment of the university's colleges of arts, science, commerce and law, the Department of Journalism became part of the College of Arts.

After the outbreak of the Second Sino-Japanese War and the fall of Shanghai in 1937, Fudan University relocated inland. Most faculty members and students moved first to Lushan and later to Chongqing, where teaching activities resumed.

In 1942, Chen Wangdao became chair of the department. He promoted democratic educational practices and advocated the principles of "disseminating truth and reforming society". Under his leadership, the department established the Journalism Hall in 1945, which combined teaching, research and practical training facilities.

In 1946, the department returned to Shanghai together with the university. During this period, prominent journalists and writers including Bu Shaofu, Xiao Qian, and Chu Anping taught as visiting lecturers.

In 1949, the Department of Journalism of Jinan University was merged into Fudan University's Department of Journalism.

During the Cultural Revolution, teaching activities were severely disrupted and the department temporarily ceased operation. Academic activities resumed after the end of the movement.

On 10 June 1988, with the approval of the Ministry of Education, the Department of Journalism was expanded into the School of Journalism. Xu Zhen was appointed dean, while Lin Fan and Li Liangrong served as vice deans.

In 1994, the school established its undergraduate programme in advertising and admitted its first cohort of students.

In December 2001, the Publicity Department of the Chinese Communist Party Shanghai Municipal Committee and Fudan University signed an agreement to jointly develop the School of Journalism.
