= James Harding (journalist) =

British journalist (born 1969)

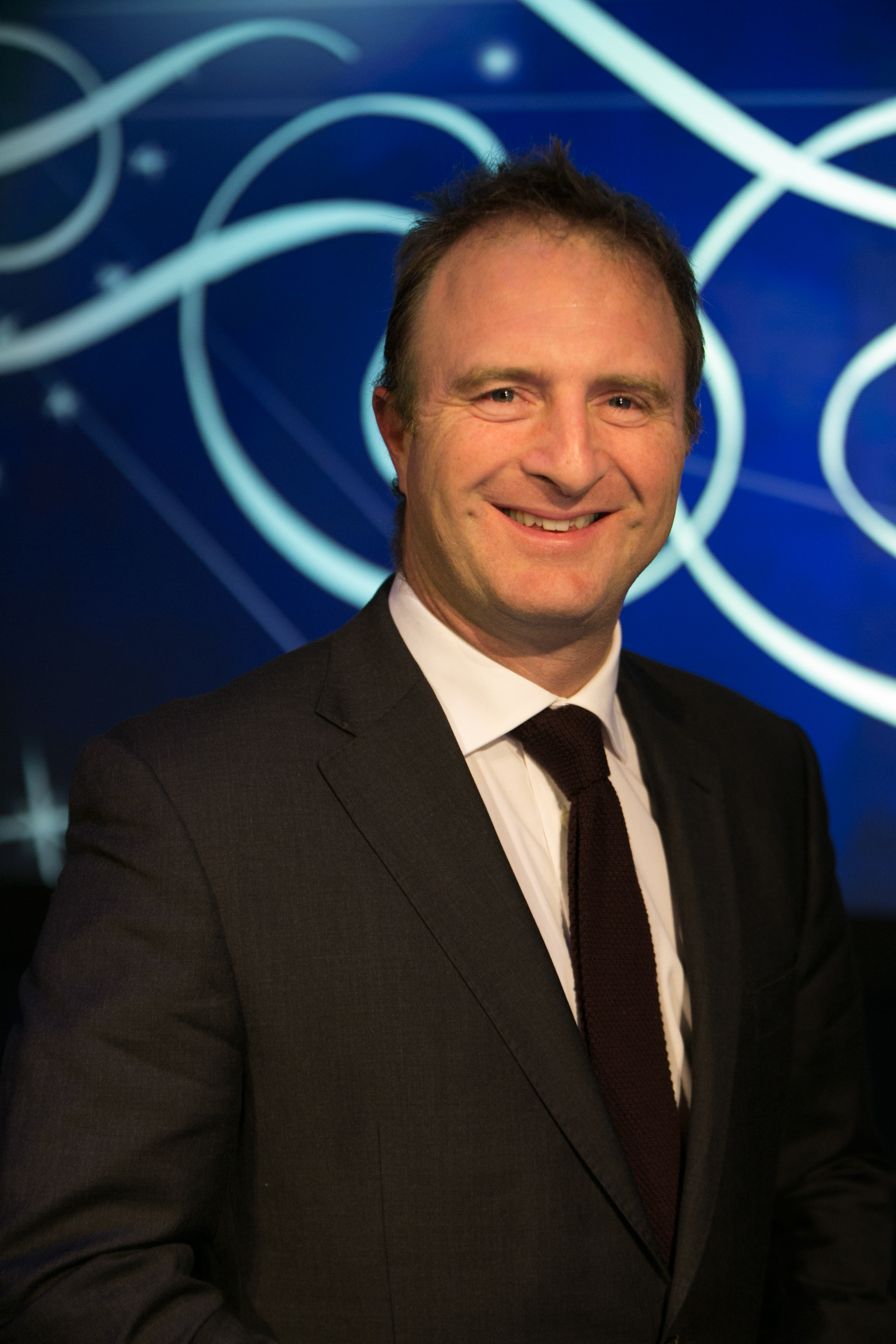
- Harding in 2014
- Born: 15 September 1969 (age 57); London, England
- Education: Trinity College, Cambridge; SOAS, University of London; City University
- Employer: Tortoise Media
- Title: Director of News & Current Affairs, BBC News (2013–2018); Editor, The Times (2007–2012)

James Paul Harding (born 15 September 1969) is a British journalist, and a former director of BBC News from August 2013 until 1 January 2018. He is the co-founder of Tortoise Media.

In December 2007, he was appointed as editor of The Times newspaper, the youngest person to assume the post, following Robert Thomson's appointment as publisher of The Wall Street Journal. He left The Times in December 2012, and was succeeded by John Witherow as acting editor.

== Early life ==
Harding was raised in north-west London, the grandson of a German Jewish refugee. He was educated at two independent schools for boys: at The Hall School in Hampstead in North West London and St. Paul's School in Barnes, near Hammersmith in London, followed by Trinity College, Cambridge (where he attained a First Class degree in history) and City University. Harding also spent a year studying at Davidson College in the United States. Harding won a Daiwa Scholarship in 1991, during which he undertook intensive Japanese language study and worked as a speechwriter to Koichi Kato, who was Chief Secretary to the Cabinet of Japan, and for the Japan unit of the European Commission. Before entering the media, he studied Japanese at the School of Oriental and African Studies. Harding speaks English, French, German, Japanese and Mandarin.

== Financial Times ==
Harding began his career as a journalist at the Financial Times in 1994 and two years later opened the paper's Shanghai bureau where he covered the opening up of the Chinese financial markets, remaining there until 1999. He served for three years as the Financial Times' Washington bureau chief.

== The Times ==
Harding joined The Times in Summer 2006 as Business Editor. His promotion to editor emerged in December 2007. Harding was its first Jewish editor. The Times, with Harding as editor, won the Newspaper of the Year Award for 2008 in March 2009 at the British Press Awards. Harding was responsible for the cancellation of the Times2 supplement, and then its re-introduction after seven months in October 2010 following complaints from readers.

With a reportedly unsustainable editorial budget, voluntary and compulsory redundancies were announced in June 2010, along with the introduction of charges for readers for the digital edition. At the end of the previous month, Harding had asserted that the Internet could "wipe out" the newspaper without a paywall being introduced.

Harding said in 2011 that he "[believes] in the state of Israel. I would have had a real problem if I had been coming to a paper with a history of being anti-Israel. And, of course, Rupert Murdoch is pro-Israel." ..."We wrote an editorial called 'In defence of Israel' during the Gaza offensive, but we also reported on the use of white phosphorus, which was the Israelis breaking their own rules." He also said at this time that the BBC does not have "a pro-Israel newsroom and it has taken management to get some balance in there". Accordingly, Harding found this "frustrating because, unlike The Times where you can just choose not to buy it, you have to pay for the BBC."

=== Leveson and after ===
During his oral submission at the Leveson Inquiry on 7 February 2012, Harding apologised for the withholding of information from the High Court, without his knowledge, that Patrick Foster, then a reporter on his newspaper, in 2009 had hacked into the blogger NightJack's email account to identify him. Richard Horton, then a Lancashire detective constable, the author, had used Nightjack as a pseudonym for his blog on policing matters. He asserted that Alastair Brett, then legal manager at The Times, had kept knowledge about the hacking from him when the newspaper had successfully appealed against an injunction application in the High Court preventing publication and preserving Horton's privacy. Apologising also to Horton and Mr Justice Eady, who had sat at the hearing, Harding said that he only learned of the newspaper's action after the court hearing in June 2009 had taken place.

Post-Leveson, Harding took on the role of negotiating with Oliver Letwin, who as Minister of State at the Cabinet Office was the Prime Minister David Cameron's representative, with the proposal of a new supervisory model for press regulation backed by a Royal charter.

In an article for The Times published on 27 November 2012, he advocated a system of independent regulation, in place of the discredited system of self-regulation, and rejected statutory regulation of the press: "We must [reform] in a way that keeps Parliament and the press apart." Harding also wrote: "The failure of News International to get to grips with what had happened at one of its newspapers suggested that the company had succumbed to that most dangerous delusion of the powerful, namely that it could play by its own set of rules." Coming from this corporate source, Roy Greenslade thought Harding's suggestion was a "significant innovation".

=== Departure ===
Harding left The Times at the end of 2012 after it had become apparent that he no longer had the support of Rupert Murdoch, or the board. It was reported in The Daily Telegraph that Murdoch had objected to the way The Times had covered the News International phone-hacking scandal at the News of the World, and also that Harding appeared to be an obstacle to the company's intention to merge the daily and Sunday titles into a seven-day operation. It was also reported at the time that Murdoch considered Harding an "ineffective manager". His final communication to his staff, was interpreted as indicating that he had not chosen to leave his post as editor. He commented in July 2013, that if a "proprietor had a different view of things from the editor, I understand that the proprietor is not leaving". In November 2017, Lord Puttnam, in evidence to the Competition and Markets Authority over Fox's bid to wholly own Sky, said Harding had been removed because The Times had backed President Obama in the 2012 presidential election.

== BBC News ==
On 16 April 2013 his appointment as head of BBC News was announced, a post formerly held by Helen Boaden, although he did not formally take up the role until August 2014. In relation to his previous editorship of The Times, a commercial rival to the BBC, Ian Burrell of The Independent asserted that The Times "was among the most strident" of the BBC's critics during Harding's tenure.

In his first speech to staff on 4 December 2014, Harding affirmed that the BBC should not avoid investigative journalism after controversies of previous years.

On 10 October 2017 it was announced that Harding would step down as head of BBC News on 1 January 2018. He was succeeded by Fran Unsworth. Harding was later reported to be working on a "new media venture" which he named Tortoise. As of January 2021, the outlet had nearly 50,000 paid-for subscribers

== Other activities ==
Harding's book Alpha Dogs was published in spring 2008.

He delivered the annual Cudlipp Lecture in March 2018.

Media offices
Preceded by Robert Thomson	Editor of The Times; 2007–2012	Succeeded by John Witherow
