= Sarah Baxter =

British journalist

- Born: Sarah April Louise Baxter; 25 November 1959 (age 66); London, England
- Citizenship: United Kingdom and United States
- Education: St Hilda's College, Oxford
- Occupation: Journalist
- Spouse: Jez Coulson
- Children: 2

Sarah April Louise Baxter (born 25 November 1959) is a British-American journalist. From 2013 to 2020, she was the deputy editor of The Sunday Times.

== Early life ==
Baxter was born on 25 November 1959 in London, England. She is the daughter of an American mother, and has dual citizenship.

Baxter was educated in the US and France, and in the UK at Ashford School, a co-educational independent school in the town of Ashford in Kent and North London Collegiate School, a girls' independent day school in the district of Edgware in north London. She studied modern history at St Hilda's College, Oxford, graduating in 1981. After leaving university, she worked for Penguin Books as a copywriter and then Virago Press as a press officer.

== Career ==
Following a period as an editor for the London edition of Time Out, she joined the New Statesman where she became the political editor. She then joined The Observer where she eventually became senior associate editor responsible for the comment section. Baxter left The Observer in 1996.

Baxter moved to The Sunday Times following an appointment as editor of the News Review section, a post in which she remained for four years. From July 2001, Baxter was based in New York. She became the Washington correspondent of The Sunday Times in 2005, before returning to London in 2009 to become editor of the newspaper's magazine, which she edited until September 2015.

In June 2013, she was appointed the deputy editor of The Sunday Times and has served as a non-executive director of Times Newspapers Holdings Ltd. She stepped down as deputy editor of The Sunday Times in 2020 and is currently director of the Marie Colvin Center for International Reporting at Stony Brook University, New York. She is a member of IPSO's Complaints Committee.

== Personal life ==
Sarah Baxter's husband, Jez Coulson, is a British photographer; the couple have two children.

Media offices
Preceded by Martin Ivens	Deputy Editor of The Sunday Times; 2013–2020	Succeeded by Ben Taylor
