= Matt Murray (journalist) =

American journalist

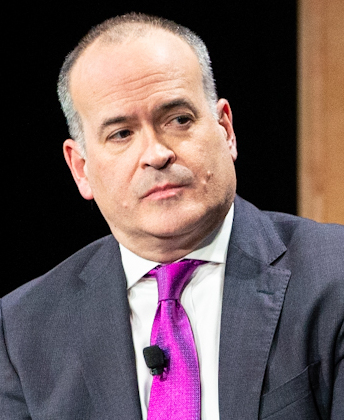
- Born: May 2, 1966 (age 60); Bethesda, Maryland, U.S.
- Education: Northwestern University (BS, MS)
- Spouse: Janine Dyck Flory (m. 2002)
- Children: 1

Matt Murray (born May 2, 1966) is an American journalist who has been the executive editor of The Washington Post since June 2024. He was the editor in chief of The Wall Street Journal from 2018 until 2023.

== Education ==
Murray attended Walter Johnson High School in Bethesda, Maryland, where he edited the school newspaper, The Pitch. He attended Medill School of Journalism, at Northwestern University, earning his bachelor's and master's degrees in journalism.

== Career ==
Murray began as a journalist at the Journal in 1994, beginning in the Pittsburgh bureau. He joined the Money & Investing section in 1997, covering banking. He rose through the ranks to deputy managing editor and then executive editor.

=== Editor-in-chief ===
On June 5, 2018, Murray was named editor-in-chief of the Wall Street Journal, succeeding Gerard Baker and assuming the role on June 11.

As editor-in-chief, Murray oversaw the Wall Street Journal investigations into Michael Cohen and the Stormy Daniels–Donald Trump scandal that led to the Journal's Pulitzer win in 2019.

In February 2020, amid backlash from the Chinese government regarding the headline of a Wall Street Journal opinion piece, Murray agreed with the complaints but could not take any action due to the separation between news and opinion at the paper.

In the wake of the murder of George Floyd and subsequent protests, journalists at the Journal sent multiple letters to Murray lamenting the paper's lack of diversity as well as demanding changes to the way the paper covers race, policing, and finance.

Murray was reported to have a strained relationship with Almar Latour, the CEO of Dow Jones, which publishes The Wall Street Journal. He was replaced as editor-in-chief by British journalist Emma Tucker on February 1, 2023.

=== Washington Post ===
In June 2024 he was appointed editor-in-chief of the Washington Post, after Sally Buzbee resigned the position. In February 2026, following mass layoffs at the Washington Post, Murray personally spiked a pre-prepared story detailing these layoffs, ensuring the Post would not have any coverage of its own downsizing.

== Personal life ==
Murray married Janine Dyck Flory, PhD, in October 2002. They live with their daughter in New York City and Washington, D.C.

== Books ==
Murray wrote The Father and the Son, about his father's journey from government employee to Benedictine monk in Illinois, and co-authored Strong Of Heart. Life And Death In The Fire Department Of New York.

- Murray, Matt (October 20, 1999). The Father and the Son: My Father's Journey into the Monastic Life. New York, New York: HarperCollins Publishers. ISBN 978-0060187828.
- Van Essen, Thomas; Murray, Matt (August 1, 2002). Strong Of Heart. Life And Death In The Fire Department Of New York. New York, New York: William Morrow and Company. ISBN 978-0060509491.
