= Frances Cairncross =

British journalist and economist (1944-)

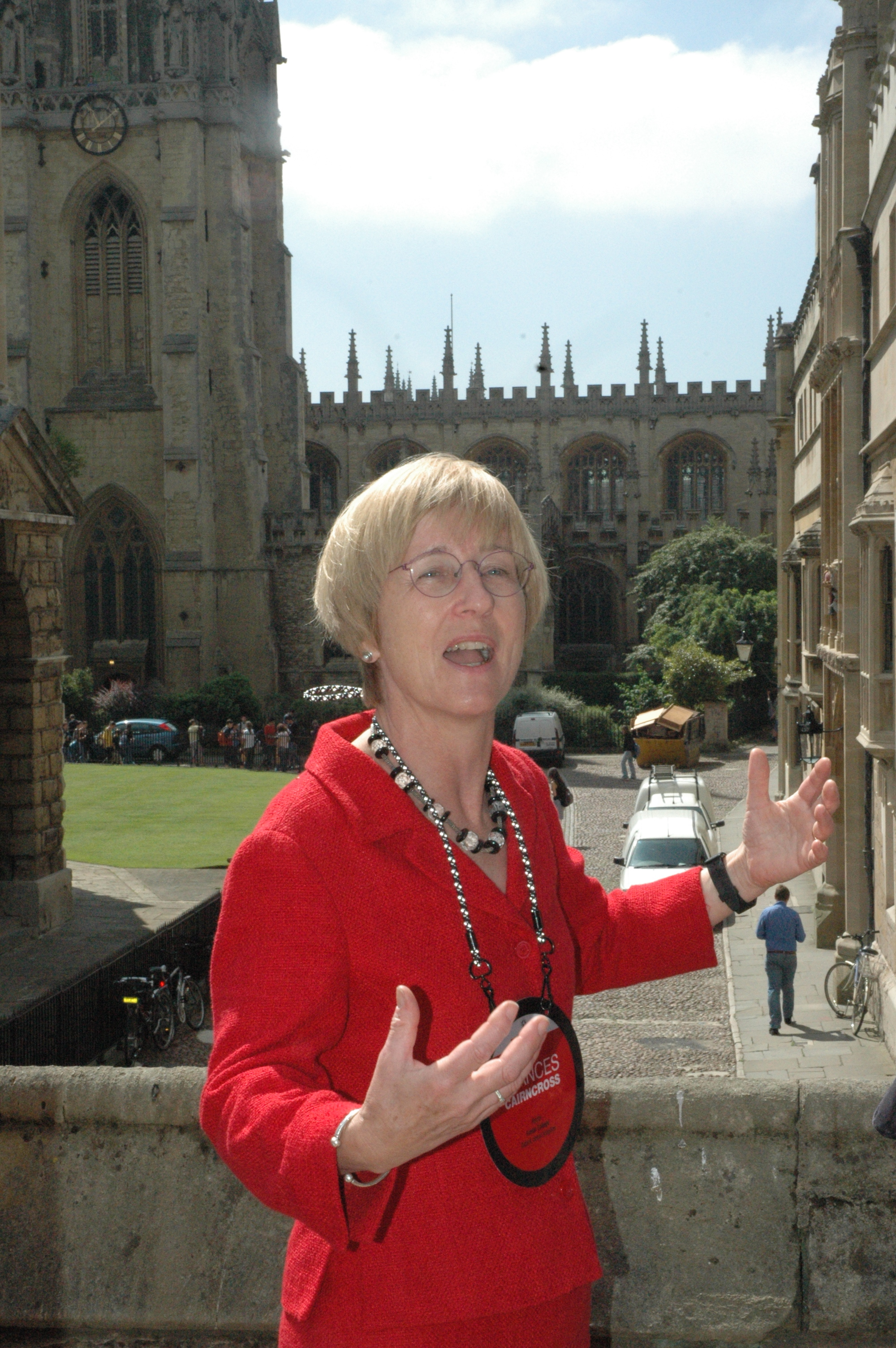
Frances Cairncross

Dame Frances Anne Cairncross, DBE, FRSE, FAcSS (born 30 August 1944 in Otley, England) is a British economist, journalist and academic. She is a senior fellow at the School of Public Policy, UCLA.

She formerly chaired the executive committee of the Institute for Fiscal Studies. From 2004 to 2014, she was the Rector of Exeter College, Oxford. Since 2015, she has been chair of the Court of Heriot-Watt University.

== Education and personal life ==
Cairncross was born on 30 August 1944 to Mary Frances (née Glynn) and the economist Sir Alexander Kirkland Cairncross. She attended Laurel Bank School in Glasgow and studied for an MA in history at St Anne's College, Oxford, graduating in 1965. She went on to study for a postgraduate MA in economics at Brown University in Providence, Rhode Island.

She holds honorary degrees from Trinity College Dublin, City University, and the universities of Glasgow, Birmingham, Bristol, Cardiff, Loughborough and Kingston. She became a Fellow of St Anne's College in 1993.

Cairncross married the journalist Hamish McRae in 1971; the couple have two daughters. Her uncle John Cairncross was an intelligence officer, spy and double agent, and a translator of literature. Her brother is the epidemiologist Sandy Cairncross.

== Career ==
Cairncross worked at The Times (1967–69), The Banker (1969) and The Observer (1970–73). From 1973 to 1984 she was on the staff of The Guardian newspaper, serving as its economics correspondent from 1973 to 1981 and as women's page editor from 1981 to 1984. She joined the staff of The Economist in 1984 working on coverage of the environment, media and public policy. From 1999 to 2004, Cairncross was management editor.

Cairncross chaired the Economic and Social Research Council between 2001 and 2007 and was president of the British Science Association (2005–06).

Her book The Company of the Future (ISBN 1861974051) was published in 2002 by Harvard Business School Press.

In March 2003, Cairncross won the Institute of Internal Auditors' annual award for business and management journalism. She authored of The Death of Distance (ISBN 0875848060), a study of the economic and social effects of the global communications revolution, first published in 1997 and re-published in a new edition in 2001.

She was Rector of Exeter College, Oxford, from October 2004 to October 2014.

Cairncross was a non-executive director of Stramongate Ltd from 2005 to 2011 and a presenter of BBC Radio 4's Analysis programme.

In 2004–05, she held the honorary post of High Sheriff of Greater London.

From 2015 to 2020, she was chair of the Court of Heriot-Watt University.

== Awards and honours ==
Cairncross has received several awards and honorary degrees from a multiple universities.

- Honorary DLitt, University of Glasgow (2001)
- Honorary DSc, University of Birmingham (2002)
- European Women of Achievement Award (2002)
- Fellow of the Royal Society of Edinburgh (2003)
- Honorary Fellow, St Peter's College Oxford (2003)
- Honorary degree, Loughborough University (2003)
- Honorary degree, University of London (2003)
- Commander of the Order of the British Empire (2004)
- Honorary degree, Cardiff University (2004)
- Honorary degree, University of Bristol (2004)
- Honorary DPhil, London Metropolitan University (2004)
- Honorary degree, Trinity College Dublin (2005)
- Honorary DBA, Kingston University (2005)
- Honorary Life Fellow, Royal Society of Arts (2006)
- Honorary degree, University of York (2011)
- Dame Commander of the Order of the British Empire (2015)
- Fellow of the Academy of Social Sciences (FAcSS) (2016)
- President's Medal of the British Academy (2018)

== Positions held ==
Academic offices
Preceded by Marilyn Butler	Rector of Exeter College, Oxford; 2004–2014	Succeeded by Rick Trainor
Honorary titles
Unknown	High Sheriff of Greater London; 2004	Succeeded by Andrew Everard Martin Smith
