= Gerard Baker =

British writer and columnist

- Born: England, UK
- Education: Corpus Christi College, Oxford (BA)

Gerard Baker is an English-American political columnist. He was Dow Jones' Managing Editor, and The Wall Street Journal's Editor-in-Chief from 2013 until 2018. Baker stepped down as WSJ Editor-in-Chief and became Editor-at-Large. He was succeeded by WSJ executive editor Matt Murray. Baker took American citizenship in December 2023.

== Early life and education ==
Baker was educated at St Mary’s and St Joseph’s Catholic School in Sidcup in south-east London. He studied philosophy, politics and economics at Corpus Christi College, Oxford, where he was president of the junior common room, and graduated with a first class honours degree.

He was left-of-centre during his university years, and was elected as a Labour vice-president of the student union. He subsequently moved towards the right.

== Career ==
Baker's first job following graduation was at the Bank of England. After working there for a year, he moved to Lloyds Bank as a Latin America analyst.

From 1988 to 1994, Baker worked for the BBC as a producer in the U.K. and in the U.S., and worked as economics correspondent for BBC Radio and television. From 1994 to 2004, Baker worked for the Financial Times. From 1994 to 1998, he worked as its correspondent in Tokyo, Japan; from 1998 to 2002, as its Washington, DC, bureau chief; and from 2002 to 2004, as its chief U.S. commentator and associate editor. From 2004 to 2009, Baker worked for The Times as its U.S. editor and as an assistant editor.

=== The Wall Street Journal ===
In January 2009, Baker moved to The Wall Street Journal, becoming the newspaper's deputy editor-in-chief. As deputy editor-in-chief, Baker (then serving under Robert Thomson) replaced Journal reporters and bureau chiefs who they felt were too liberal. Baker was then dismissive of "what he saw as the turgid style of American journalists." In 2009, a year after their appointment, Thomson and Baker were reported to have given the newspaper a more conservative outlook and, according to David Carr of The New York Times, their editing reflected "a chronic skepticism of the" Obama administration. On 1 March 2013, he was named the Dow Jones Managing Editor, and The Wall Street Journal's Editor-in-Chief.

Baker's tenure at the Journal was a tumultuous one, with buyouts, layoffs and discontent among some reporters. In 2015, the Journal began a new round of large-scale layoffs of reporters and staff. Some sections of the paper's print edition, including Greater New York, were cut, while others were consolidated. The Journal also undertook "a sweeping newsroom strategy review" called WSJ2020, to save $100 million in costs.

In November 2015, Baker was one of the moderators at the fourth Republican primary debate during the 2016 presidential primaries. He was the first British-born moderator of a U.S. presidential debate. Baker's performance became an issue on social media, with The Daily Telegraph reporting that Baker had "bemused" and "flummoxed" America.

==== Theranos investigation ====
Baker was John Carreyrou's editor when the latter investigated and reported on the Theranos scandal for the Journal.

==== Trump presidency ====
In 2016 and 2017, the Journal leadership under Baker was criticised, both from the outside and from within the newsroom, who viewed the paper's coverage of President Donald Trump as too timid. Particularly controversial was the Journal's November 2016 front-page headline that repeated Trump's false claim that "millions of people" had voted illegally in the election, without reporting his statement was inaccurate.

Also controversial was a January 2017 note from Baker to Journal editors, directing them to avoid using the phrase "seven majority-Muslim countries" when writing about Trump's executive order on travel and immigration; Baker later sent a follow-up note "clarifying that there was 'no ban'" on the phrase, "but that the publication should 'always be careful that this term is not offered as the only description of the countries covered under the ban.'"

At a town-hall-style meeting with Journal staff in February 2017, Baker defended the paper's coverage, saying that it was objective and protected the paper from being "dragged into the political process" through a dispute with the Trump administration.

==== Editor-at-large ====
On 5 June 2018, the Journal announced that Baker would step down as editor-in-chief and step into the role of editor at large, effective 11 July 2018. Matt Murray succeeded Baker as editor in chief.

As editor at large, Baker's regular column remained part of the news division. In May 2020, a column written by Baker in the wake of the murder of Ahmaud Arbery, which argued that the news media failed to report crimes committed by black people against whites, was criticized in a letter sent by the Independent Association of Publishers' Employees, the union representing Journal reporters, for violating rules that apply to the news division. The letter stated Baker's column "posits the highly controversial argument that black people commit more hate crimes than white people" and to "'prove' that he uses only his own single weighted statistical calculation, with no attribution or context from experts either to support the idea or provide contrary views." Baker was subsequently reassigned to the opinion division where staff have more flexibility.

== Criticism in the media ==
Baker describes himself as a "right-wing curmudgeon"; writer and media critic David Carr described Baker in 2009 as "a neoconservative columnist of acute political views." Baker holds Eurosceptic views, arguing against closer European integration.

Ryan Chittum, a former Wall Street Journal reporter, criticised Baker in the Columbia Journalism Review as "an Iraq War-cheerleading neocon, goofball Obama ridiculer, and author of some of the wrongest commentary of the financial crisis". Chittum highlighted several of Baker's previous writings, including a column in the Financial Times in 2003 in which Baker mocked French opposition to the Iraq War, and a column in The Times in 2006 in which Baker argued that "we are going to have to get ready for war with Iran."

On 25 January 2021, five days after the inauguration of Joe Biden, Baker said in an opinion piece for The Wall Street Journal that under Biden presidency, Trump supporters would be forced to enter Democratic "re-education programs" run by Alexandria Ocasio-Cortez and journalists from the Washington Post. In a separate article, The New York Times columnist Nicholas Kristof referred to the column as right-wing fearmongering.

== Portrayals in the media ==
Although he is a white British man, the writers of The Dropout, the 2023 Hulu dramatization of the life of Theranos CEO Elizabeth Holmes and the events leading to the collapse of the company, portrayed Baker as a black American woman called Judith Baker, played by LisaGay Hamilton. The producers did not explain the change.
