= Dave Brown (cartoonist) =

British political cartoonist

Dave Brown (born 4 December 1957) is a British political cartoonist who worked for the Independent newspaper in London for almost 30 years. He was laid off in May 2026. At the end of May 2026 travel correspondent Simon Calder moved to the Daily Telegraph, having worked for the Independent for 32 years.

Brown began his career at The Sunday Times in 1989, working for other publications before joining The Independent in 1998.

== Controversy ==
Dave Brown's cartoon of former Israeli Prime Minister Ariel Sharon as a "Monster eating Palestinian babies" in a paraphrase on Saturn Devouring One of his Children, a grotesque painting done by Francisco de Goya in 1819.

Brown became well known for his cartoon of former Israeli Prime Minister Ariel Sharon as a "Monster eating Palestinian babies" in a paraphrase on Saturn Devouring One of his Children, a grotesque painting done by Francisco de Goya in 1819. For this cartoon, Brown won the 2003 Political Cartoon of the Year award, presented by the former cabinet minister Clare Short on 25 November 2003 at the headquarters of The Economist in London.

After it received numerous complaints, the Press Complaints Commission (PCC) decided that the cartoon did not breach its code.

== See also ==
- Media coverage of the Arab-Israeli conflict
- Carlos Latuff
