= Ben Taylor (newspaper editor) =

British newspaper editor

Ben Taylor is a British newspaper editor.

Taylor became a journalist and began working for the Daily Mail in about 1998. He rose to become executive editor, before in 2020 moving to become deputy editor of the Sunday Times. He was effectively acting editor of the newspaper from December 2022, and was formally appointed to the post in January 2023.

Media offices
Preceded by Sarah Baxter	Deputy Editor of the Sunday Times; 2020–2023	Succeeded by Krissi Murison
Preceded by Emma Tucker	Editor of the Sunday Times; 2023–present	Succeeded by Incumbent
