= Martin Ivens =

English journalist (born 1958)

Martin Paul Ivens (born 29 August 1958) is an English journalist and editor of The Times Literary Supplement. He is a former editor of The Sunday Times.

== Early life ==
Ivens was born in Hampstead in North London in 1958. He is the son of Michael Ivens, a former director of the right-wing pressure group Aims of Industry. Ivens was educated at Finchley Catholic High School in Finchley in north London, and St Peter's College, Oxford.

== Career ==
Ivens worked for The Sunday Telegraph under Peregrine Worsthorne, then moved to News International and was appointed deputy editor of The Sunday Times in 1996. His political column for the paper began in September 2007.

When John Witherow, the editor of The Sunday Times, was appointed editor of The Times in January 2013 Ivens was named editor of The Sunday Times. The independent directors of Times Newspapers initially refused to make either appointment permanent, but they confirmed both men in their posts on 27 September that year.

Ivens stepped down as editor of The Sunday Times in January 2020 and was replaced by Emma Tucker. He then joined the board of directors of Times Newspapers. Rupert Murdoch, Executive Chairman of News Corp, said: "Under Martin's editorship The Sunday Times has broken investigative stories of global impact, such as the reporting on FIFA, and the paper has built on its strong record for political reporting and campaigning. Martin's wisdom and encyclopaedic knowledge of history have long enriched The Sunday Times and its readers and I thank Martin for his great service."

On 29 June 2020, Ivens succeeded Stig Abell as editor of The Times Literary Supplement.Since 2020 he has also written a weekly opinion column for Bloomberg.

== Personal life ==
Ivens is married to the journalist Anne McElvoy. The couple have two sons and one daughter.

Media offices
Preceded by Sue Douglas	Deputy Editor of The Sunday Times; 1996–2013	Succeeded by Sarah Baxter
Preceded by John Witherow	Editor of The Sunday Times; 2013–2020	Succeeded by Emma Tucker
Preceded by Stig Abell	Editor of The Times Literary Supplement; 2020–present	Succeeded by Incumbent
