= Hamish McRae =

British financial journalist and author

- Born: Hamish Malcolm Donald McRae; 20 October 1943 (age 82); Devon, United Kingdom
- Education: Fettes College, Trinity College Dublin (BA, Economics and Political Science, 1966)
- Occupations: Journalist, author, economic commentator
- Notable work: The World in 2020, The World in 2050

Hamish Malcolm Donald McRae (born 20 October 1943) is a British economic journalist, author, and commentator known for his analyses of global economic trends and future forecasts. He writes the weekly Armchair Economics column for the i newspaper and the City Comment column for The Mail on Sunday. He previously served as a columnist and Associate Editor for The Independent.

== Early life and education ==
McRae was born on 20 October 1943 in Devon, England. His family later moved to the Isle of Man and then to Ireland. He attended Fettes College in Edinburgh and studied economics and political science at Trinity College Dublin, graduating with a BA in 1966.

== Career ==
McRae began his career at the Liverpool Post in 1966 and later worked for The Banker and Euromoney. From 1975 to 1989, he was financial editor of The Guardian. In 1989 he joined The Independent, where he was a columnist until 2018 and associate editor from 1991 to 2018.

Since 2019, McRae has written the weekly Armchair Economics column for the i and the City Comment column for The Mail on Sunday.

== Books ==
McRae is the author of several works on economics and future studies:

- Capital City: London as a Financial Centre (with Frances Cairncross), Methuen, 1973.
- The World in 2020: Power, Culture and Prosperity, HarperCollins, 1995.
- Wake-Up Japan (with Tadashi Nakamae), Weidenfeld & Nicolson, 1999.
- What Works: Success in Stressful Times, HarperPress, 2010 – longlisted for the FT/Goldman Sachs Business Book of the Year.
- The World in 2050: How to Think About the Future, Bloomsbury, 2022.

== Academic appointments and affiliations ==
- Visiting professor, University of Manchester Institute of Science and Technology (UMIST), 1999–2004.
- Visiting professor, Lancaster University, 2005–2010.
- Adjunct Professor, Trinity College Dublin, 2012–2015 and 2019–2024.
- Council Member, Royal Economic Society, 2005–2010.
- Fellow, Academy of Social Sciences, elected 2016.
- Orwell Fellow, elected 2010.

== Recognition ==
- Wincott Foundation Financial Journalist of the Year, 1979.
- David Watt Prize for Political Journalism, 2005.
- Business and Finance Journalist of the Year, British Press Awards, 2006.

== Personal life ==
McRae married journalist and economist Frances Cairncross in 1971. They live in London and have two daughters.
