= Tony Gallagher (editor) =

British newspaper editor (born 1963)

- Born: 2 November 1963 (age 62)
- Education: Finchley Catholic High School; University of Bristol; City, University of London
- Occupation: Newspaper editor
- Employer: The Times
- Children: 3

Tony Gallagher (born 2 November 1963) is a British newspaper journalist, and is currently editor of The Times.

He was editor of The Daily Telegraph, joint deputy editor of the Daily Mail, and editor of The Sun in 2015, before being appointed editor of The Times in 2022.

== Career ==
Gallagher attended Finchley Catholic High School in north London, the University of Bristol, and then City, University of London. He began his career as a trainee journalist at the Southern Evening Echo in Southampton in 1985, and moved to the South West News Agency in Bristol in 1987. He joined Today in 1988, and became a reporter at the Daily Mail in 1990.

He attracted attention for his Diana, Princess of Wales–related exclusives. He later became news editor and finally assistant editor in 2006. He joined The Daily Telegraph in October 2006 as head of news and became deputy editor in September 2007.

As deputy editor, Gallagher took the lead on exclusives relating to the MPs' expenses scandal. In November 2009, he was promoted to editor.

Gallagher relinquished his post with immediate effect in January 2014 and went on leave, spending some time working at the London restaurant Moro. In April 2015 he became deputy editor of the Daily Mail and shared the role with John Steafel. Gallagher said: "My huge admiration for Paul Dacre is well known and I am greatly looking forward to joining his outstanding team."

Gallagher was appointed editor of The Sun on 2 September 2015. Victoria Newton succeeded him as The Sun's editor, after Gallagher was appointed deputy editor of The Times effective 10 February 2020.

In June 2022 Gallagher came under scrutiny for deleting a story unfavourable to Boris Johnson in The Times while acting for editor John Witherow while he was on holiday. Johnson and Gallagher had been seen jogging together in the past. Gallagher had been in temporary charge of The Times for most of the year, while Witherow had been on sick leave. On 28 September 2022 Gallagher was confirmed as the new editor of the newspaper, as Witherow stepped down.

In September 2023, the New Statesman named Gallagher among the most influential people in British right-wing politics.

== Personal life ==
Gallagher is married with three children.

Media offices
Preceded by Ian MacGregor	Deputy Editor of The Daily Telegraph; 2007–2009	Succeeded by Benedict Brogan
Preceded by William Lewis	Editor of The Daily Telegraph; 2009–2014	Succeeded by Chris Evans; Monday to Friday; Ian MacGregor; Saturday
Preceded by Jon Steafel	Deputy Editor of the Daily Mail; 2014–2015; With: Jon Steafel	Succeeded by Jon Steafel
Preceded by David Dinsmore	Editor of The Sun; 2015–2020	Succeeded by Victoria Newton
Preceded by Emma Tucker	Deputy Editor of The Times; 2020–2022	Succeeded by Maggie O'Riordan
Preceded by John Witherow	Editor of The Times; 2022–present	Incumbent
