= Victoria Newton =

English journalist (born 1970)

- Born: 9 March 1970 (age 55); Liverpool, England
- Education: Rushcliffe School
- Alma mater: Newnham College, Cambridge
- Employer: The Sun

Victoria Newton (born 9 March 1970) is the editor of The Sun. She formerly ran its "Bizarre" showbiz column and then became deputy editor of the paper, becoming senior editor in February 2020.

== Early life ==
She attended Rushcliffe School, a comprehensive in West Bridgford, Nottinghamshire, where her father, Don, was deputy-headmaster. She went to Newnham College, Cambridge.

== Career ==
Newton started in Fleet Street in 1993 at the Daily Express as a trainee after graduating from university, and then worked at The People. In 1998, she became an assistant to Dominic Mohan on The Sun's "Bizarre" pages, before becoming the paper's Los Angeles correspondent in 1999. Newton returned to the UK in 2002 to become the Daily Mail's showbiz editor, but returned to The Sun in 2003 to become editor of "Bizarre" replacing the departing Dominic Mohan. She described it as her "dream job" in September 2005.

In November 2007, it was announced that Newton would be leaving "Bizarre" and had been promoted to Head of Features and Entertainment. She was replaced by her assistant, Gordon Smart. Newton remained in this job until her appointment as the deputy editor of the News of the World in October 2009, a position she retained until the paper's closure in 2011. In September 2013, she was appointed the editor of The Sun on Sunday after being deputy editor of The Sun's whole seven-day operation. Her immediate superior remained David Dinsmore, The Sun's editor.

Newton was appointed as editor of The Sun in February 2020 when her predecessor Tony Gallagher became deputy editor of The Times. The Sun on Sunday is still being presided over by Newton.

== Awards ==
- British Press Awards 2006 – Show Business Writer of the Year

== See also ==
- News Corporation
- News Limited

Media offices
| Preceded by Jane Johnson | Deputy Editor of the News of the World; 2009–2011 | Succeeded by Position abolished |
| Preceded by New position | Editor of the Sun on Sunday; 2013–present With: Keith Poole 2020–present | Incumbent |
| Preceded by Tony Gallagher | Editor of The Sun; 2020–present | Incumbent |
