= Alice Miles =

British journalist

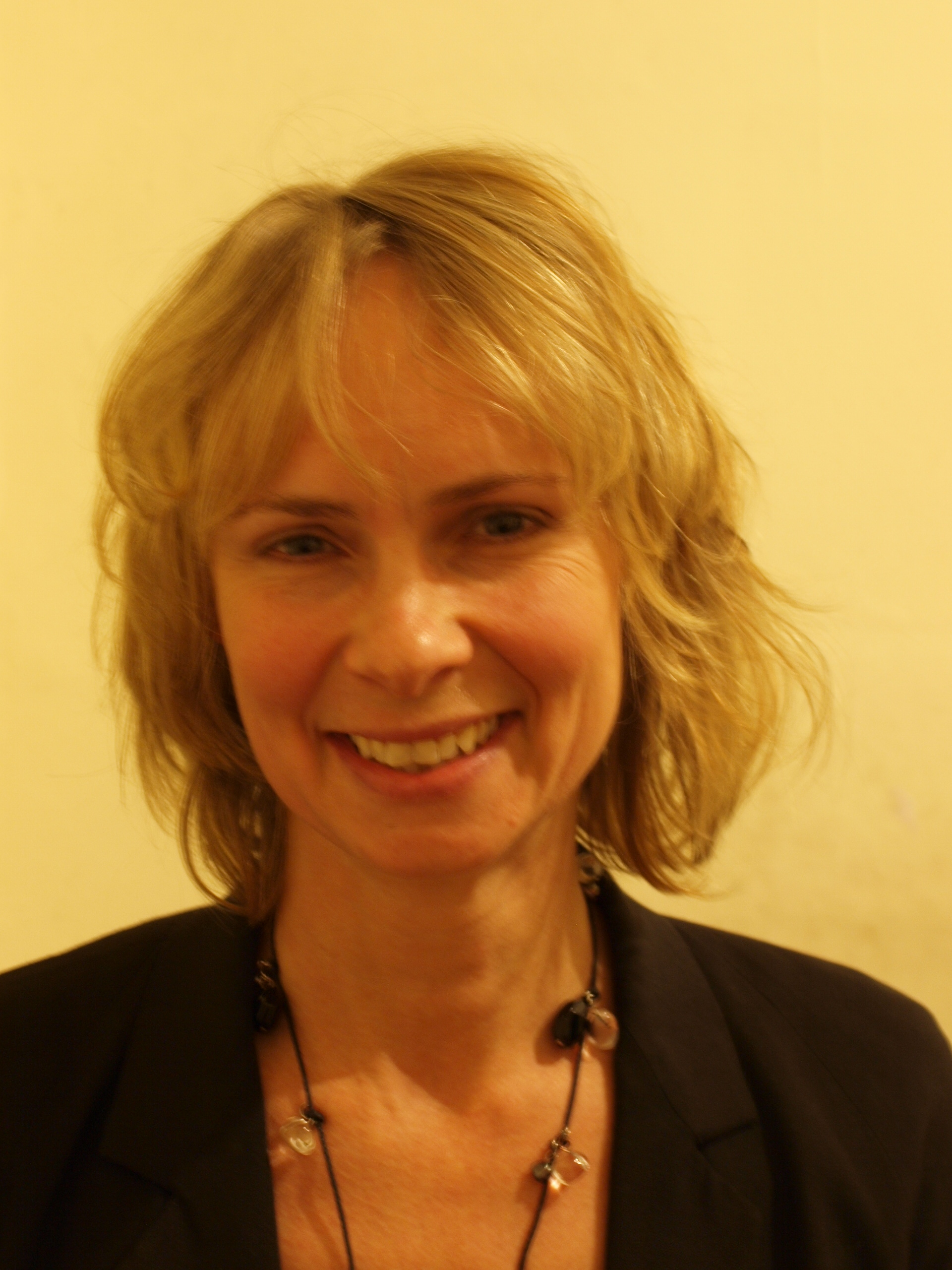
- Occupations: Journalist, political commentator
- Notable credit(s): The Times; Evening Standard; Daily Express

Alice Miles is a British journalist. From 1999, she worked for The Times, initially as a parliamentary sketch writer, later as a columnist specialising in health and social policy.

After graduating from Southampton University, Miles was adopted as a trainee on The Mail on Sunday. She has also worked as a reporter for the Evening Standard and as a leader writer on the Daily Express, and qualified as a barrister. A potential female presenter on Today around 2001, she was not ultimately appointed.

Miles won the What the Papers Say Columnist of the Year award in 2007.

Miles was appointed in September 2012 to a paid post (alongside Dr Tim Leunig), advising the Education Secretary Michael Gove and Liberal Democrat Minister of State for Schools David Laws.
