= Deborah Ross (journalist) =

British journalist and author

Deborah Ross is a British journalist and author. Her work has appeared regularly in The Independent, the Daily Mail, and The Spectator. She is a columnist and feature writer for The Times.

In 2012, she was awarded broadsheet Interviewer of the Year in British Press Awards for her work in The Independent, and had previously been nominated for the award in 2006.

== Personal life ==
Ross has a sibling. She is married with an older daughter and a younger son.

== Bibliography ==
- How Not to be a Domestic Goddess: (And Always Go to Bed on an Argument). Profile Books, 2008. ISBN 978-1861978912
- Ross, Deborah (4 October 2008). "Losing is the new winning". The Spectator: 52–53.
- — (4 January 2014). "Uphill struggle". Arts. The Spectator. 324 (9671): 30.
