= Christopher Asher =

American track and field coach

Christopher Asher is a track and field coach in the NCAA. He served on the UCLA staff from 2012 to 2013 as a full-time assistant coach, working with the Bruin women's and men's 400m and 4 X 400m relay and helping to direct University of California, Los Angeles recruiting efforts. Asher was the director of Track and Field/Cross Country at California State University, Los Angeles.

Asher has coached numerous CCAA Conference Champions, over 30 All-Americans and an NCAA Champion. His 2006 women's cross country team captured the NCAA West Region Championship and finished 4th at the NCAA Championships. His women's cross country team also captured the 2007 CCAA Championship and placed 5th at the NCAA Championships.

Asher has coached professional athletes Derek Knight (top-5 USA ranked 110mHH), Sergio Santos (1st round MLB pick for the Arizona Diamondbacks), Reuben Droughns (NFL-Detroit Lions, Denver Broncos, Cleveland Browns, New York Giants) and Trevor Ariza (NBA- New York Knicks, Orlando Magic, L.A. Lakers).

Asher currently serves on several committees including vice-president of the Cal-Nevada Coaches Association, vice-president of Division 2 for the USTFCCCA, and is on the Zero Tolerance USA Track and Field Committee for USA Track and Field Coaches Advisory Committee. He has been selected CCAA Conference Coach of the Year for Cross Country (2007) as well as the 2006 USTFCCCA West Region Coach of the Year for Cross Country/Indoor Track and Field. He holds a BA degree in African-American Studies from California State University, Northridge and a Master of Education Degree in Physical Education from Azusa Pacific University.
