= St Alban's Catholic Church, North Finchley =

Church in North Finchley, London

Coordinates: 51.6136°N 0.1805°W

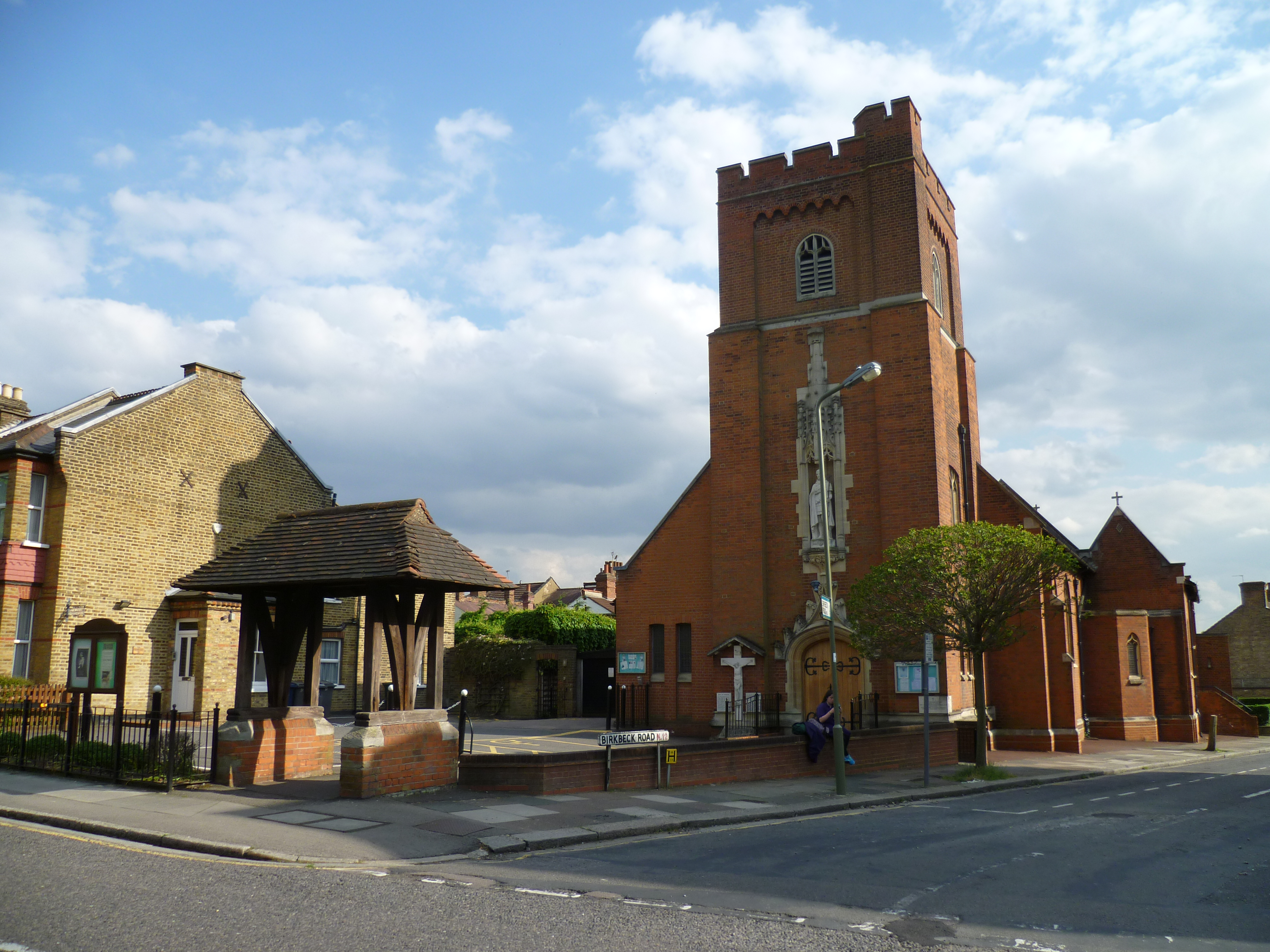
St Alban's Catholic Church, Finchley

St Alban's Catholic Church is a parish of the Roman Catholic Church in on the corner of Nether Street and Birkbeck Road in North Finchley, London. It is situated in the Barnet Deanery of the Diocese of Westminster.

Founded in 1903, the church was completed in 1908. The church is dedicated to Saint Alban and includes a statue of the saint in an alcove on the tower.

== War memorial ==
Adjacent to the main entrance to the church is a war memorial to the dead of the First World War which includes a diverse range of names and units. One such is Acting Lieutenant Cyril Edward McLaughlin of the Royal Navy who was awarded the Distinguished Service Order in 1919 "In recognition of the gallantry and devotion to duty displayed by him in sweeping and destroying mines, often under heavy enemy fire". McLaughlin died after the end of the war while serving on HMS Humber in North Russia on 5 October 1919 and was buried in the Troitza Churchyard of Archangel Allied Cemetery.

== Gallery ==
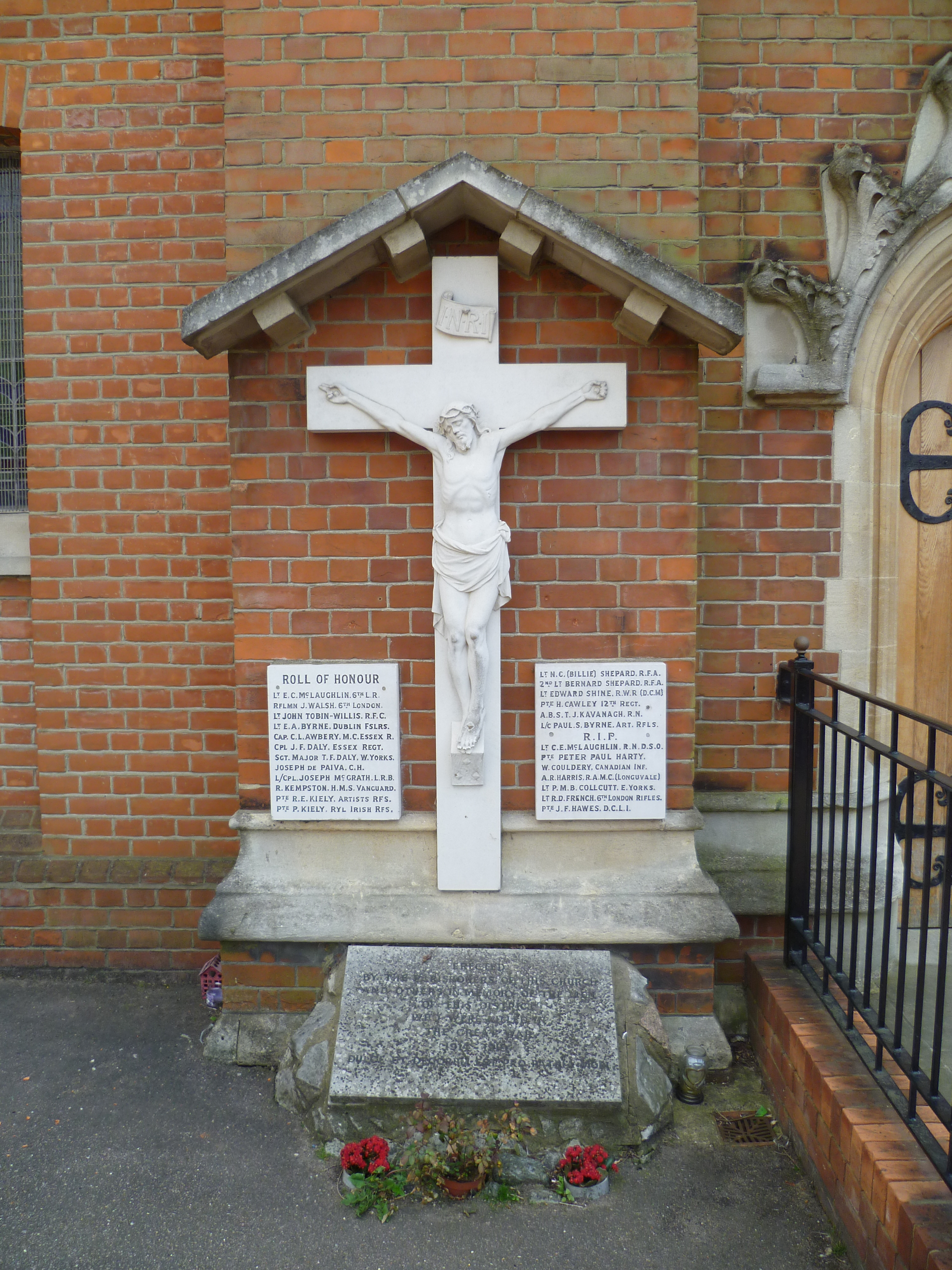
The war memorial next to the main entrance.

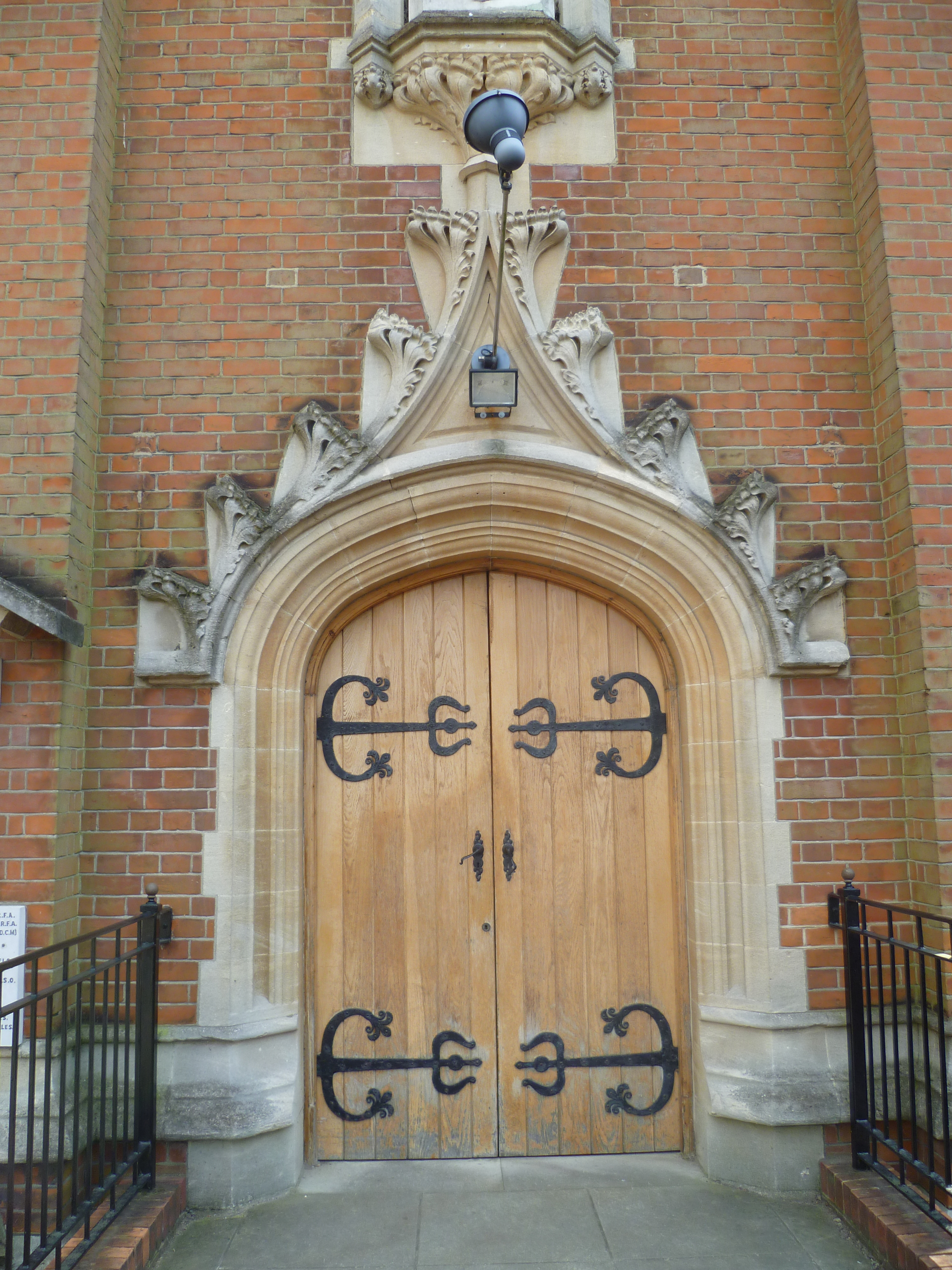
Main entrance.

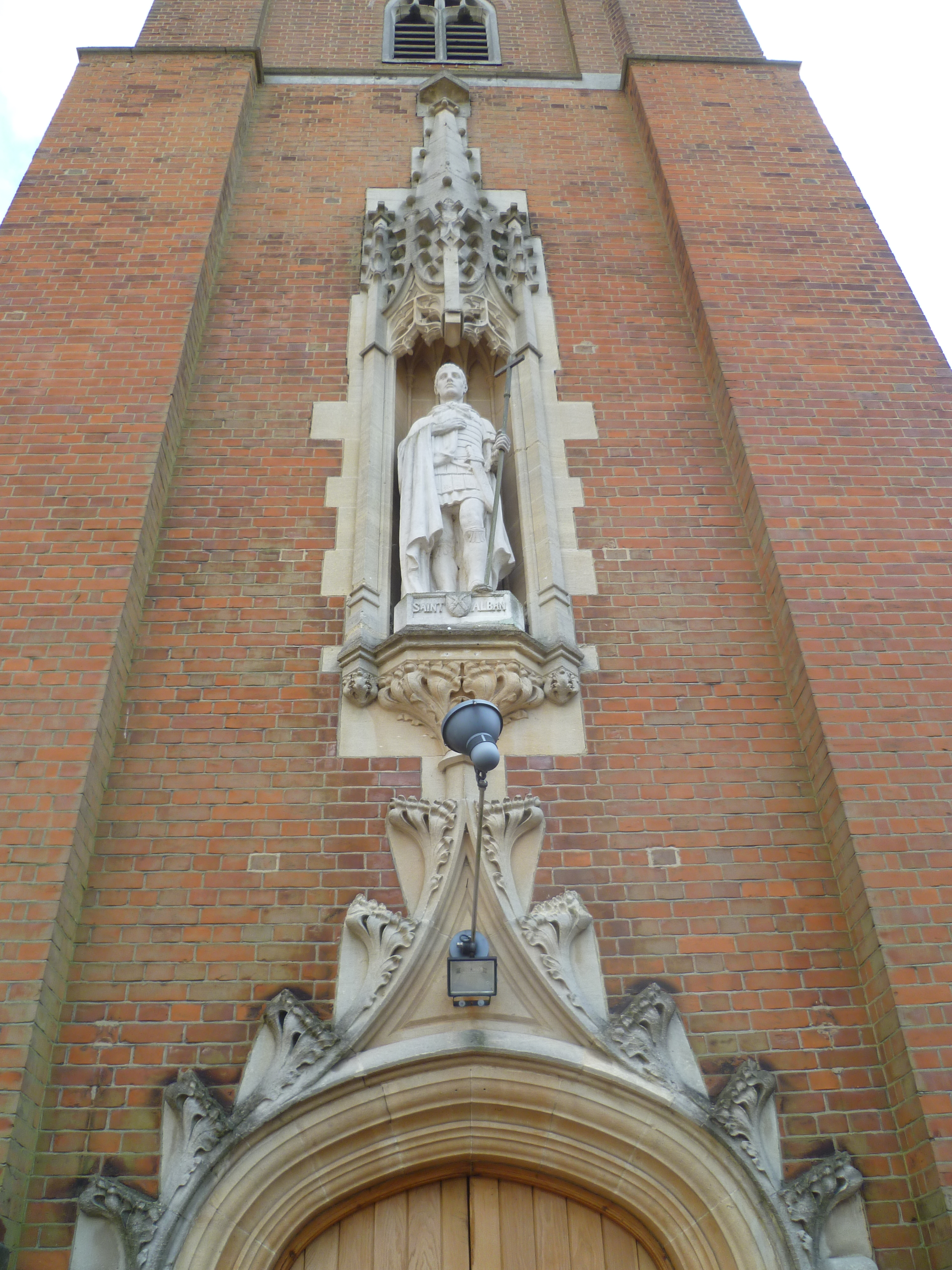
Statue of St Alban.
