= John Witherow =

British newspaper editor (born 1952)

- Born: 20 January 1952 (age 74); Johannesburg, South Africa
- Education: Bedford School
- Alma mater: Cardiff University; University of York
- Children: 3

John Witherow (born 20 January 1952) is a former editor of British newspaper The Times. A former journalist with Reuters, he joined News International (now News UK) in 1980 and was appointed editor of The Sunday Times in 1994 and editor of The Times in 2013.

== Early life ==
Witherow was born in Johannesburg, South Africa. He migrated to Britain in the mid 1950s before moving to Melbourne, Australia, in the late 1950s. He returned to Britain in the early 1960s, where he attended Bedford School and the University of York.

== Career ==
Witherow began his career in 1970 in South West Africa, (the future Namibia), where he set up a library for local students. While there he started working as a freelance reporter for the BBC World Service in Namibia.

After university, Witherow was taken on by Reuters news agency in 1977 as a trainee and sent to the Cardiff School of Journalism. He then moved to Reuters, working in London and Madrid before joining The Times as a reporter in 1980.

At The Times, he covered the Iran–Iraq war and was sent on the aircraft carrier Invincible to cover the Falklands War.

After the fall of Port Stanley in June 1982, he returned to the UK on a Hercules plane with the SAS – later writing a book, The Winter War, The Falklands, with Patrick Bishop, a war correspondent for The Observer newspaper.

Witherow moved to The Sunday Times in 1983 under the editorship of Andrew Neil. There he served in several positions, including defence editor, diplomatic editor, foreign editor and head of news. Witherow was made acting editor after the departure of Neil in 1994. He was confirmed in the job the following year.

In early 2013, Witherow was made editor of The Times in succession to James Harding, despite opposition from the newspaper's independent directors who objected to the fact Rupert Murdoch had not consulted them. The Times' independent directors confirmed the appointment in September of that year, and The Times won Newspaper of the Year for 2014 in The Press Awards.

According to The Guardian, negotiations over the terms of Witherow's departure as editor of The Times went on "for some time", with Witherow on sick leave for much of 2022. During this time, his deputy Tony Gallagher was in temporary charge of the newspaper. On 27 September 2022 Witherow stood down as editor of The Times to become chair of Times Newspapers. Gallagher was confirmed as his successor the next day.

== Controversies ==
Early in Witherow's editorship at The Sunday Times the paper published false claims that Labour politician Michael Foot was a KGB agent. The paper reached a settlement with Foot over the claim.

In 2010, Witherow sought to defend the critic A. A. Gill after he called Clare Balding a "dyke on a bike" in a TV review. Replying to a letter of complaint from Balding, Witherow wrote, "In my view some members of the gay community need to stop regarding themselves as having a special victim status and behave like any other sensible group that is accepted by society. Not having a privileged status means, of course, one must accept occasionally being the butt of jokes. A person's sexuality should not give them a protected status." Balding complained to the Press Complaints Commission and the complaint was upheld.

While working as editor at The Times, Witherow received a letter from leading UK scientists, including Lord Krebs and Lord Stern, which criticised an article for being based on a method that "involves ignoring everything that science has discovered about atmospheric physics since the discovery of greenhouse warming by John Tyndall more than 150 years ago" while adding, "On social media it has, literally, been a laughing stock." The letter went on to argue that this article was not an isolated example as it added to a series of articles that appeared to be designed to undermine climate science and consequent emission reduction programs.

In 2016, as editor of The Times, Witherow failed to cover the Hillsborough stadium disaster inquest verdict on its front page. He later admitted this had been a mistake, however. The Times' football correspondent, Tony Barrett, resigned in protest at the paper's apparent failure.

== Personal life ==
Witherow has three children from his former marriage to Sarah Linton.

== Works ==
- Witherow, John & Bishop, Patrick (1982). The Winter War: Falklands Conflict. Quartet Books. ISBN 0-7043-3424-0.
- Witherow, John & Sullivan, Aidan (1991). The Sunday Times War in the Gulf: A Pictorial History. St. Martin's Press. ISBN 0-312-06706-2.

== Bibliography ==
- The International Who's Who 2004. Routledge. 2003.

Media offices
Preceded by Andrew Neil	Editor of The Sunday Times; 1994–2013	Succeeded by Martin Ivens
Preceded by James Harding	Editor of The Times; 2013–2022	Succeeded by Tony Gallagher
