= Department of Journalism, City University =

Journalism school in London, England

Department of Journalism
- Established: 1976
- Affiliation: City, University of London
- Head: Mel Bunce
- Academic staff: 50+
- Students: 500
- Location: London, UK
- Website: http://www.city.ac.uk/journalism/

The Department of Journalism at City, University of London, is a journalism school in London. It is regarded as one of the best universities in the United Kingdom for the study of journalism. as well as the nation's largest centre for journalism education. It was described by Michael Hann of The Guardian, along with Cardiff School of Journalism, Media and Cultural Studies, as the "Oxbridge of journalism".

The British newspaper The Independent praised its "legendary status within the media", primarily due to its practical approach to journalism and its "unparalleled access to media facilities".

The department is situated in the university's Grade II listed College Building, which dates from 1894.

== Ranking ==
The department is ranked 1st in the UK for graduate prospects in media and communications (Sunday Times Good University Guide 2022), 1st in the UK for Communications and Media Studies (The Complete University Guide 2023) and 1st in London for overall satisfaction in Journalism (NSS 2022)

The department is ranked 1st for journalism in the Guardian Good University Guide with a score of 100.
