= Marc Aspland =

English photographer

Marc Aspland is an English photographer who works for The Times newspaper in London, where he shoots sports photography.

== Career ==
Aspland has won prizes for some of his photography including a Special Award at the 2005 Sports Photographer of the Year.

In 2014, Aspland was awarded an Honorary Fellowship of The Royal Photographic Society.
