= Steve Connor =

American football player (born 1961)

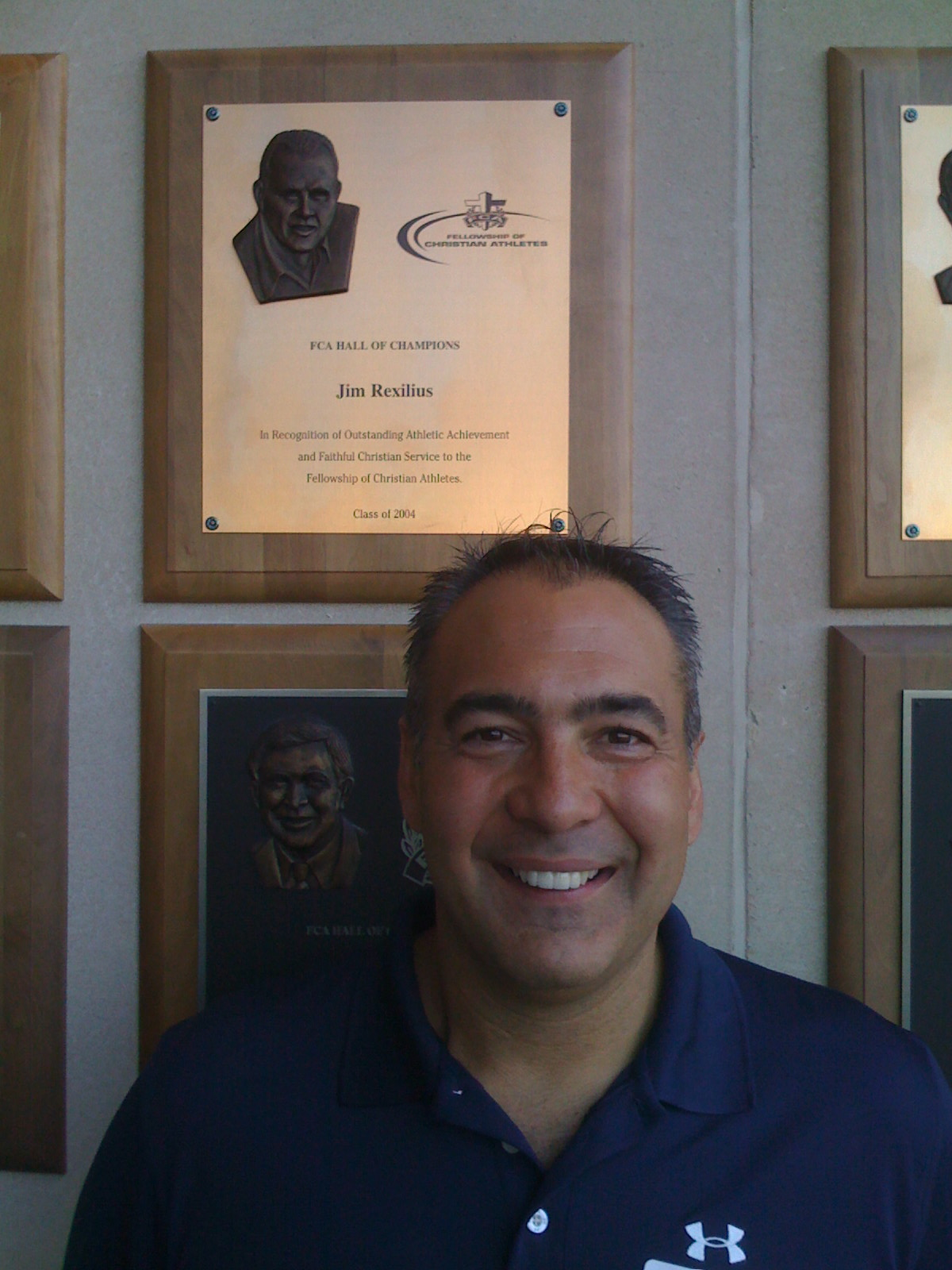

Profile
- Position: Defensive tackle

Personal information
- Born: October 5, 1961 (age 65); Wheaton, Illinois

Career information
- College: Northern Illinois, Azusa Pacific

Career history
- 1984–1985: Chicago Bears
- 1985–1986: Los Angeles Rams

Steve Connor (born October 5, 1961) is an author, speaker, leadership coach, and former NFL football player. He is the founder of Sports Outreach International.

== Sports Outreach International ==
Founded by Steve Connor in 1996, Sports Outreach International is devoted to developing leadership and fraternity through the avenues of sports and competition. They work with youth and sports organizations in countries across the globe. Sports Outreach International is associated with several different sports ministry organizations, including Intersports, Fellowship of Christian Athletes, Athletes in Action and Christians in Sport. While living in England and Scotland (1990–2004) Connor helped pioneer youth sports ministries helping establish Christian sports camps (SportsPlus) in England, Scotland, Wales and Ireland.

Connor has given lectures at many institutions, including Oxford University, Sandhurst Military Academy, Eton College and Joe Gibbs Racing.

Connor has published eleven books, including A Sporting Guide to Eternity (2004), which reached Thomas Wesley best-seller status and was short-listed for “Harvest” Christian book of the year in 2004. Connor designed a copyright free Coaching Character Curriculum that has been adapted for use in Africa, as well as by coaches, youth workers and organizations in Europe, Asia, Australia, North America, and South America.

== Career in American Football ==
Connor attended Wheaton North High School in northern Illinois, where he was a prominent football player. He first attended Northern Illinois University, as a Division 1 scholarship athlete in football. From there, he transferred to Azusa Pacific University, where he was twice named an All-American player (1982 and 1983) and was inducted into APU's Hall of Fame in 2008. After college, Steve was a free agent for the 1984 Chicago Bears, ending his season on the injured reserve list. In the 1985 season, he was picked up by the L.A. Rams as a free agent, where he suffered a career-ending knee injury.

== Coaching and Sports Leadership ==
After his time as a player, Connor moved on to coach football and work in sports ministry and sports leadership. He first coached at Western Washington University (1986). Later he became the Southern Indiana Area Director for the Fellowship of Christian Athletes. He was Chaplain of Indiana University's varsity football team from 1987 to 1989 under Coach Bill Mallory, whom Connor had first met when Mallory coached at Northern Illinois University. Connor then coached the Oxford Saints American Football Club in England from 1990 to 1995. He was also Assistant Head Coach for the United States Air Force team at RAF Upper Heyford. In 1992–93, He has had various roles in chaplaincy to players in the Scottish Premier League and England's Premier League. He was Chaplain for the NFL Europe Scottish Claymores from 1999 to 2004. He returned as Chaplain for Indiana University's varsity football team under Coach Kevin Wilson. He facilitated the network of sports ministries in North America 2006-2015 and teaches leadership globally, establishing ministry organizations on every continent.

== Personal life ==
Connor lives with his wife in Rockaway Beach Missouri.

== Awards and honors ==
- Letter Winner (Football), Northern Illinois University, 1979–1980
- All-American (Football), Azusa Pacific University, 1982–83
- Centennial Award 1999, Azusa Pacific University
- Hall of Fame, Azusa Pacific University, 2006
- Oxford Saints Hall of Fame, 2008
- L.H.D. Litterarum Humanarum Doctorate from Azusa Pacific University, 2009

== Books ==
- Sports Plus, 1996
- Sports Outreach Scotland (Magazine), 1999–2004
- Sports Outreach, 2003
- TEAMS Study Series, 2003
  - Leadership Teams
  - Impact Teams
  - Discovery Teams
- A Sporting Guide to Eternity, 2004
- NT: Sport (Europe), 2004
- NT: Sport (USA), 2004
- Power: NT (South Pacific), 2005
- . Rugged Discipleship, 2020
