= The Sunday Times =

British newspaper, founded 1821

- The Sunday Times cover (13 July 2014)
- Type: Sunday newspaper
- Format: Broadsheet
- Owner: News UK
- Founder: Henry White
- Editor: Ben Taylor
- Founded: 18 February 1821; 205 years ago (as The New Observer)
- Political alignment: Centre-right
- Headquarters: The News Building, 1 London Bridge Place, London, SE1 9GF
- Circulation: 647,622 (as of March 2020)
- Sister newspapers: The Times
- ISSN: 0956-1382
- Website: thetimes.com

The Sunday Times is a British Sunday newspaper whose circulation makes it the largest in Britain's quality press market category. It was founded in 1821 as The New Observer. It is published by Times Newspapers Ltd, a subsidiary of News UK (formerly News International), which is owned by News Corp. Times Newspapers also publishes The Times. The two papers, founded separately and independently, have been under the same ownership since 1966. They were bought by News International in 1981.

In March 2020, The Sunday Times had a circulation of 647,622, exceeding that of its main rivals, The Sunday Telegraph and The Observer, combined. While some other national newspapers moved to a tabloid format in the early 2000s, The Sunday Times retained the larger broadsheet format and has said that it intends to continue to do so. As of December 2019, it sold 75% more copies than its sister paper, The Times, which is published from Monday to Saturday.

The paper publishes The Sunday Times Rich List and The Sunday Times Fast Track 100.

== History ==
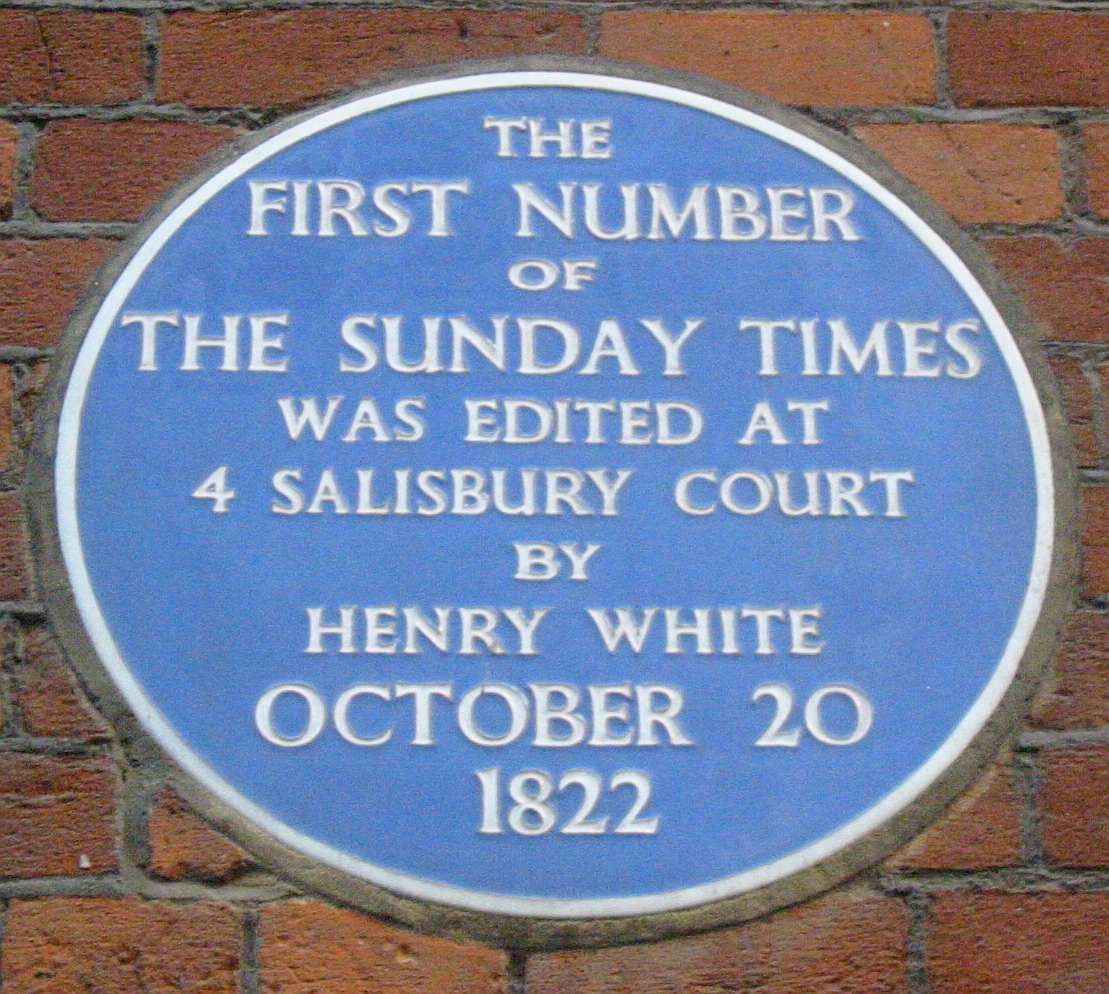
Plaque at No. 4 Salisbury Court, London, commemorating the first edition of The Sunday Times

=== Founding and early history (1821–1915) ===
The paper began publication on 18 February 1821 as The New Observer, but from 21 April its title was changed to the Independent Observer. Its founder, Henry White, chose the name apparently in an attempt to take advantage of the success of The Observer, which had been founded in 1791, although there was no connection between the two papers. On 20 October 1822 it was reborn as The Sunday Times, although it had no relationship with The Times. In January 1823, White sold the paper to Daniel Whittle Harvey, a radical politician.

Under its new owner, The Sunday Times notched up several firsts. A wood engraving it published of the coronation of Queen Victoria in 1838 was the largest illustration to have appeared in a British newspaper. In 1841, it became one of the first papers to serialise a novel: William Harrison Ainsworth's Old St Paul's.

The paper was bought in 1887 by Alice Anne Cornwell, who had made a fortune in mining in Australia and by floating the Midas Mine Company on the London Stock Exchange. She bought the paper to promote her new company, The British and Australasian Mining Investment Company, and as a gift to her lover Phil Robinson. Robinson was installed as editor and the two were later married in 1894.

In 1893 Cornwell sold the paper to Frederick Beer, who already owned The Observer. Beer appointed his wife, Rachel Sassoon Beer, as editor. She was already editor of The Observer – the first woman to run a national newspaper – and continued to edit both titles until 1901.

=== The Kemsley years (1915–1959) ===
There was a further change of ownership in 1903, and then in 1915 the paper was bought by William Berry and his brother, Gomer Berry, later ennobled as Lord Camrose and Viscount Kemsley respectively. Under their ownership, The Sunday Times continued its reputation for innovation: on 23 November 1930, it became the first Sunday newspaper to publish a 40-page issue and on 21 January 1940, news replaced advertising on the front page.

In 1943, the Kemsley Newspapers Group was established, with The Sunday Times becoming its flagship paper. At this time, Kemsley was the largest newspaper group in Britain.

On 12 November 1945, Ian Fleming, who later created James Bond, joined the paper as foreign manager (foreign editor) and special writer. The following month, circulation reached 500,000. On 28 September 1958, the paper launched a separate Review section, becoming the first newspaper to publish two sections regularly.

=== The Thomson years (1959–1981) ===
The Kemsley group was bought in 1959 by Lord Thomson, and in October 1960 circulation reached one million for the first time. In another first, on 4 February 1962 the editor, Denis Hamilton, launched The Sunday Times Magazine. (At the insistence of newsagents, worried at the impact on sales of standalone magazines, it was initially called the "colour section" and did not take the name The Sunday Times Magazine until 9 August 1964.) The cover of the first issue, titled "A sharp glance at the mood of Britain" featured a full-bleed 11-frame grid of David Bailey photographs of Jean Shrimpton wearing a Mary Quant outfit, surrounding one frame devoted to a John Bulmer action pic of Burnley’s legendary striker Jimmy McIlroy.

The magazine got off to a slow start, but the advertising soon began to pick up, and, over time, other newspapers launched magazines of their own. English writer Jilly Cooper got her first break in journalism, writing a column on young married life from 1968, leading to her first book How to Stay Married and a 2020 collection, Between the Covers.

Harold Evans, editor from 1967 until 1981, established The Sunday Times as a leading campaigning and investigative newspaper. On 19 May 1968, the paper published its first major campaigning report on the drug thalidomide, which had been reported by the Australian doctor William McBride in The Lancet in 1961 as being associated with birth defects, and been quickly withdrawn. The newspaper published a four-page Insight investigation, titled "The Thalidomide File", in the "Weekly Review" section. On 17 November 1972, the Queen's Bench Divisional Court issued an injunction to prevent The Sunday Times from publishing further articles, as it was feared that the paper's campaign might affect ongoing lawsuits over the ensuing scandal. The newspaper appealed to the European Court of Human Rights, which found that the injunction violated the publisher's right to freedom of expression, noting that the articles were moderate and balanced and thus unlikely to disrupt proceedings.

=== The Murdoch years (1981–present) ===
Rupert Murdoch's News International acquired the group in February 1981. Murdoch, an Australian who in 1985 became a naturalised American citizen, already owned The Sun and the News of the World, but the Conservative government decided not to refer the deal to the Monopolies and Mergers Commission, citing a clause in the Fair Trading Act that exempted uneconomic businesses from referral. The Thomson Corporation had threatened to close the papers down if they were not taken over by someone else within an allotted time, and it was feared that any legal delay to Murdoch's takeover might lead to the two titles' demise. In return, Murdoch provided legally binding guarantees to preserve the titles' editorial independence.

Evans was appointed editor of The Times in February 1981 and was replaced at The Sunday Times by Frank Giles. In 1983, the newspaper bought the serialisation rights to publish the faked Hitler Diaries, thinking them to be genuine after they were authenticated by the own newspaper's own independent director, Hugh Trevor-Roper, the historian and author of The Last Days of Hitler.

Under Andrew Neil, editor from 1983 until 1994, The Sunday Times took a strongly Thatcherite slant that contrasted with the traditional paternalistic conservatism expounded by Peregrine Worsthorne at the rival Sunday Telegraph. It also built on its reputation for investigations. Its scoops included the revelation in 1986 that Israel had manufactured more than 100 nuclear warheads and the publication in 1992 of extracts from Andrew Morton's book, Diana: Her True Story in Her Own Words.

In January 1986, after the announcement of a strike by print workers, production of The Sunday Times, along with other newspapers in the group, was shifted to a new plant in Wapping, and the strikers were dismissed. The plant, which allowed journalists to input copy directly, was activated with the help of the Electrical, Electronic, Telecommunications and Plumbing Union (EETPU). The print unions posted pickets and organised demonstrations outside the new plant to try to dissuade journalists and others from working there, in what became known as the Wapping dispute. The demonstrations sometimes turned violent. The protest ended in failure in February 1987.

During Neil's time as editor, The Sunday Times backed a campaign to prove that HIV was not a cause of AIDS. In 1990, The Sunday Times serialised a book by an American conservative who rejected the scientific consensus on the causes of AIDS and argued that AIDS could not spread to heterosexuals. Articles and editorials in The Sunday Times cast doubt on the scientific consensus, described HIV as a "politically correct virus" about which there was a "conspiracy of silence", disputed that AIDS was spreading in Africa, claimed that tests for HIV were invalid, described the HIV/AIDS treatment drug AZT as harmful, and characterised the WHO as an "Empire-building AIDS [organisation]". The pseudoscientific coverage of HIV/AIDS in The Sunday Times led the scientific journal Nature to monitor the newspaper's coverage and to publish letters rebutting Sunday Times articles which The Sunday Times refused to publish. In response to this, The Sunday Times published an article headlined "AIDS – why we won't be silenced", which claimed that Nature engaged in censorship and "sinister intent". In his 1996 book, Full Disclosure, Neil wrote that the HIV/AIDS denialism "deserved publication to encourage debate". That same year, he wrote that The Sunday Times had been vindicated in its coverage, "The Sunday Times was one of a handful of newspapers, perhaps the most prominent, which argued that heterosexual Aids was a myth. The figures are now in and this newspaper stands totally vindicated ... The history of Aids is one of the great scandals of our time. I do not blame doctors and the Aids lobby for warning that everybody might be at risk in the early days, when ignorance was rife and reliable evidence scant." He criticised the "AIDS establishment" and said "Aids had become an industry, a job-creation scheme for the caring classes."

Edition number 9,813 of The Sunday Times, published on 7 October 2012

John Witherow oversaw a rise in circulation to 1.3 million and reconfirmed The Sunday Times's reputation for publishing hard-hitting news stories – such as the cash for questions scandal in 1994 and the cash for honours scandal in 2006, and revelations of corruption at FIFA in 2010. The newspaper's foreign coverage has been especially strong, and its reporters, Marie Colvin, Jon Swain, Hala Jaber, Mark Franchetti and Christina Lamb have dominated the Foreign Reporter of the Year category at the British Press Awards since 2000. Colvin, who worked for the paper from 1985, was killed in February 2012 by Syrian forces while covering the siege of Homs during that country's civil war.

In common with other newspapers, The Sunday Times has been hit by a fall in circulation, which has declined from a peak of 1.3 million to just over 710,000. It has a number of digital-only subscribers, which numbered 99,017 by January 2019.

During January 2013, Martin Ivens became 'acting' editor of The Sunday Times in succession to John Witherow, who became the 'acting' editor of The Times at the same time. The independent directors rejected a permanent position for Ivens as editor to avoid any possible merger of The Sunday Times and daily Times titles.

In 2019, after passing government scrutiny, The Sunday Times and The Times began to "share resources" in what was considered a partial merger, though retaining distinct editors.

== Circulation ==
In March 2020, The Sunday Times had a circulation of 647,622, exceeding that of its main rivals, The Sunday Telegraph and The Observer, combined. While some other national newspapers moved to a tabloid format in the early 2000s, The Sunday Times retained the larger broadsheet format and has said that it intends to continue to do so. As of December 2019, it sold 75% more copies than its sister paper, The Times, which is published from Monday to Saturday.

== Election endorsements ==
The paper endorsed the Conservative Party in the 2005, 2010, 2015, 2017 and 2019 UK general elections, before endorsing the Labour Party in the 2024 election.

== Online presence ==
The online presences of The Sunday Times and The Times have been repeatedly combined and separated over the years.

Prior to 2001, distinct websites thetimes.co.uk and thesundaytimes.co.uk existed. In 2001, these were combined into Times Online.

In 2010, Times Online was replaced with distinct websites again for The Sunday Times and The Times.

In 2016, The Times and The Sunday Times' websites were once again merged into one.

In 2024, the domain name was changed from "thetimes.co.uk" to "thetimes.com".

An iPad edition was launched in December 2010, and an Android version in August 2011. Since July 2012, the digital version of the paper has been available on Apple's Newsstand platform, allowing automated downloading of the news section. With over 500 MB of content every week, it is the biggest newspaper app in the world.

The Sunday Times iPad app was named newspaper app of the year at the 2011 Newspaper Awards and has twice been ranked best newspaper or magazine app in the world by iMonitor. Various subscription packages exist, giving access to both the print and digital versions of the paper.

On 2 October 2012, The Sunday Times launched Sunday Times Driving, a separate classified advertising site for premium vehicles that also includes editorial content from the newspaper as well as specially commissioned articles. It can be accessed without cost.

== Related publications ==
=== The Sunday Times Travel Magazine ===
This 164-page monthly magazine was sold separately from the newspaper and was Britain's best-selling travel magazine. The first issue of The Sunday Times Travel Magazine was in 2003, and it included news, features and insider guides.

== Notable stories ==
Some of the more notable or controversial stories published in The Sunday Times include:

- Thalidomide, a drug prescribed to pregnant women to treat morning sickness, was withdrawn in 1961 following reports that it was linked to a number of birth defects. The Sunday Times spent many years campaigning for compensation for the victims, providing case studies and evidence of the side-effects. In 1968, the Distillers Company agreed to a multimillion-pound compensation scheme for the victims.
- The paper sponsored Francis Chichester's single-handed circumnavigation of the world under sail in 1966–67, and the Sunday Times Golden Globe Race in 1968–69.
- The Insight team ran an investigation into Kim Philby, the Soviet double agent, that ran on 1 October 1967 under the headline "Philby: I spied for Russia from 1933".
- Insight carried out a major investigation in 1972 into Bloody Sunday in Northern Ireland.
- The newspaper published the faked Hitler Diaries (1983), believing them to be genuine after they were authenticated by historian Hugh Trevor-Roper.
- Israeli nuclear weapons: using information from Mordechai Vanunu, The Sunday Times in 1986 revealed that Israel had manufactured more than 100 nuclear warheads.
- On 12 July 1987 The Sunday Times began serialisation of the book Spycatcher, the memoirs of an MI5 agent, which had been banned in Britain. The paper successfully challenged subsequent legal action by the British government, winning its case at the European Court of Human Rights in 1991.
- The paper ran a story claiming Queen Elizabeth II, who generally maintains a strictly impartial role politically, was upset with the style of Margaret Thatcher's leadership.
- In 1990, in what became known as the Arms-to-Iraq affair, the paper revealed how Matrix Churchill and other British firms were supplying arms to Saddam Hussein's Iraq.
- In 1992, the paper published extracts from Andrew Morton's book Diana: Her True Story in Her Own Words, which revealed for the first time the disastrous state of her marriage to Prince Charles.
- In its "cash for questions" investigation in 1994, Graham Riddick, MP for Colne Valley and David Tredinnick, MP for Bosworth, accepted cheques for £1,000 each from an Insight journalist posing as a businessman in return for tabling a parliamentary question. The investigation followed information that some MPs were taking one-off payments to table questions.
- Under the headline, "KGB: Michael Foot was our agent", The Sunday Times ran an article on 19 February 1995 that claimed the Soviet intelligence services regarded Foot, a former leader of the Labour Party, as an "agent of influence", codenamed "Agent Boot", and that he had been in the pay of the KGB for many years. The article was based on the serialisation of the memoirs of Oleg Gordievsky, a former high-ranking KGB officer who defected from the Soviet Union to Britain in 1985. Crucially, the newspaper used material from the original manuscript of the book which had not been included in the published version. Foot successfully sued for libel, winning "substantial" damages.
- In 1997–98, the paper ran a series of exclusive stories based on revelations from Richard Tomlinson, a former MI6 spy, about life inside MI6 and secret MI6 operations around the world.
- During the siege of the United Nations compound in East Timor in 1999, the paper's foreign reporter, Marie Colvin, was one of only three journalists (all women) who remained to the end with the 1,500 people trapped there. She reported their plight both in The Sunday Times and in interviews on radio and television and was widely credited with saving their lives.
- In 2003, The Sunday Times published confidential Whitehall documents revealing the names of more than 300 people who had declined New Year's, Queen's Birthday and Dissolution honours (i.e. knighthoods, OBEs, etc.)
- In 2006, in an investigation that became known as "cash for honours", The Sunday Times revealed how several prominent figures nominated for life peerages by the then prime minister, Tony Blair, had loaned large amounts of money to the Labour Party at the suggestion of Lord Levy, a Labour Party fundraiser.
- In mid-2009, the newspaper ran a series of articles revealing how politicians were abusing the expenses system.
- Between 2004 and 2010, the newspaper ran an award-winning investigation by Brian Deer which revealed that research by Andrew Wakefield into the MMR vaccine was fraudulent. The investigation led to Wakefield being banned from medicine, and the retraction of his research from The Lancet.
- In March 2010, undercover reporters from The Sunday Times Insight team filmed members of parliament agreeing to work for a fictitious lobbying firm for fees of £3,000–£5,000 a day. One of those implicated, Stephen Byers, described himself as "sort of like a cab for hire".
- In October 2010, an investigation by the newspaper exposed corruption within FIFA after a member of the association's committee which grants the World Cup guaranteed his vote to an undercover reporter after requesting £500,000 for a "personal project".
- In 2011, the paper broke what became known as the cash for influence scandal: it revealed that MEPs Adrian Severin, Ernst Strasser, Pablo Zalba Bidegain and Zoran Thaler tried to influence EU legislation in exchange for promised money. Both Strasser and Thaler resigned in March 2011.
- In March 2012, the paper filmed Peter Cruddas, the co-treasurer of the Conservative Party, offering access to David Cameron, the prime minister, in return for donations of £250,000. Cruddas resigned several hours later. Cameron said: "What happened was completely unacceptable. This is not the way we raise money in the Conservative Party."
- In January 2013, the seven-times Tour de France winner Lance Armstrong confessed to having used performance-enhancing drugs during each of his Tour victories. The confession ended years of denials about allegations of cheating during most of the cyclist's professional career. The Sunday Times chief sports writer David Walsh had spent over a decade investigating Armstrong, his team and the systematic doping rife in the sport. The newspaper was forced to pay Armstrong £300,000 in damages in 2006 after he sued it for libel. Following Armstrong's lifelong ban (and subsequent televised confession) The Sunday Times said it would sue him to recover the damages, plus interest and costs, for the original proceedings which it called "baseless and fraudulent".
- In June 2014, the Insight team at The Sunday Times published a front-page story "Plot to buy the World Cup" that detailed how Qatar used secret slush funds to make dozens of payments totalling more than $US5 million to senior officials at FIFA to ensure the country won enough votes to secure hosting rights to the 2022 FIFA World Cup. The revelation prompted calls for Qatar to be stripped of hosting the World Cup. The reporting by Jonathan Calvert and Heidi Blake won numerous awards, including the Paul Foot Award. It also formed the basis for the book by Calvert and Blake, published by Simon & Schuster, The Ugly Game.
- In June 2015, The Sunday Times ran a lead front article titled "British spies betrayed to Russians and Chinese". The article was controversial because it contained numerous unlikely and unsubstantiated claims. Shortly after publication parts of the online version of the article were changed quietly by the newspaper. The article appeared to be an attempt to smear the American whistleblower Edward Snowden, thus fuelling further doubt as to its independent editorship.
- A 2016 Sunday Times investigation into the unsolved Whiston murders of John Greenwood and Gary Miller in 1980 led to the unearthing of new evidence, which led Merseyside Police to re-open the 40-year-old case. Subsequently, in 2019 police attempted to re-try the original suspect acquitted in 1981 under double jeopardy legislation, but were not permitted to do so by the Director of Public Prosecutions, causing police to campaign for a change in the double jeopardy law.
- In August 2019, The Sunday Times received the leaked Operation Yellowhammer file about preparations for a "no deal" Brexit.
- In April 2020, an investigation by The Sunday Times' Insight team revealed Prime Minister Boris Johnson had skipped five COBR meetings in the early months of the COVID-19 pandemic in the United Kingdom. The investigation suggested that the British government underestimated the threat of the virus and failed to adequately prepare, and scrutinised Johnson's leadership during the crisis. It became the most read story in the history of The Times. This, and subsequent investigations into the government's pandemic response, formed the basis of the 2021 book Failures of State.

== Controversies ==
=== Phone hacking scandal ===
In July 2011, The Sunday Times was implicated in the wider News International phone hacking scandal, which primarily involved the News of the World, a Murdoch tabloid newspaper published in the UK from 1843 to 2011. Former British prime minister Gordon Brown accused The Sunday Times of employing "known criminals" to impersonate him and obtain his private financial records. Brown's bank reported that an investigator employed by The Sunday Times repeatedly impersonated Brown to gain access to his bank account records. The Sunday Times vigorously denied these accusations and said that the story was in the public interest and that it had followed the Press Complaints Commission code on using subterfuge.

=== Errors ===
Over two years in the early 1990s, The Sunday Times published a series of articles rejecting the role of HIV in causing AIDS, calling the African AIDS epidemic a myth. In response, the scientific journal Nature described the paper's coverage of HIV/AIDS as "seriously mistaken, and probably disastrous". Nature argued that the newspaper had "so consistently misrepresented the role of HIV in the causation of AIDS that Nature plans to monitor its future treatment of the issue."

In January 2010, The Sunday Times published an article by Jonathan Leake, alleging that a figure in the IPCC Fourth Assessment Report was based on an "unsubstantiated claim". The story attracted worldwide attention. However, a scientist quoted in the same article later stated that the newspaper story was wrong and that quotes of him had been used in a misleading way. Following an official complaint to the Press Complaints Commission, The Sunday Times retracted the story and apologised.

In September 2012, Jonathan Leake published an article in The Sunday Times under the headline "Only 100 adult cod in North Sea". This figure was later shown by a BBC article to be wildly incorrect. The newspaper published a correction, apologising for an over simplification in the headline, which had referred to a fall in the number of fully mature cod over the age of 13, thereby indicating this is the breeding age of cod. In fact, as the newspaper subsequently pointed out, cod can start breeding between the ages of four and six, in which case there are many more mature cod in the North Sea.

=== Allegations of antisemitism ===
In 1992, the paper agreed to pay David Irving, an author widely criticised for Holocaust denial, the sum of £75,000 to authenticate the Goebbels diaries and edit them for serialisation. The deal was quickly cancelled after drawing strong international criticism.

In January 2013, The Sunday Times published a Gerald Scarfe caricature depicting Israel's Prime Minister Benjamin Netanyahu cementing a wall with blood and Palestinians trapped between the bricks. The cartoon sparked an outcry in Israel, compounded by the fact that its publication coincided with International Holocaust Remembrance Day, and was condemned by the pro-Israeli Anti-Defamation League. After Rupert Murdoch tweeted that he considered it a "grotesque, offensive cartoon" and that Scarfe had "never reflected the opinions of The Sunday Times" the newspaper issued an apology. Journalist Ian Burrell, writing in The Independent, described the apology as an "indication of the power of the Israel lobby in challenging critical media coverage of its politicians" and one that questions Rupert Murdoch's assertion that he does not "interfere in the editorial content of his papers".

In July 2017, Kevin Myers wrote a column in The Sunday Times saying "I note that two of the best-paid women presenters in the BBC – Claudia Winkleman and Vanessa Feltz, with whose, no doubt, sterling work I am tragically unacquainted – are Jewish. Good for them". He continued "Jews are not generally noted for their insistence on selling their talent for the lowest possible price, which is the most useful measure there is of inveterate, lost-with-all-hands stupidity. I wonder, who are their agents? If they're the same ones that negotiated the pay for the women on the lower scales, then maybe the latter have found their true value in the marketplace". After the column The Sunday Times fired Myers. The Campaign Against Antisemitism criticised The Sunday Times for allowing Myers to write the column despite his past comments about Jews.

== Other editions ==
=== Irish edition ===
The Republic of Ireland edition of The Sunday Times was launched on a small scale in 1993 with just two staff: Alan Ruddock and John Burns (who started as financial correspondent for the newspaper and is at present acting associate editor). It used the slogan "The English just don't get it". As of 2012 it is the third biggest-selling newspaper in Ireland measured in terms of full-price cover sales. Circulation had grown steadily to over 127,000 in the two decades before 2012, but has declined since and in 2018 stood at 60,352 (January to June 2018).

The paper is heavily editionalised, with extensive Irish coverage of politics, general news, business, personal finance, sport, culture and lifestyle. The office employs 25 people. The paper also has a number of well-known freelance columnists including Brenda Power, Liam Fay, Matt Cooper, Damien Kiberd, Jill Kerby and Stephen Price. However, it ended collaboration with Kevin Myers after he had published a controversial column. The Irish edition has had four editors since it was set up: Alan Ruddock from 1993 until 1996, Rory Godson from 1996 until 2000, Fiona McHugh from 2000 to 2005, and from 2005 until 2020 Frank Fitzgibbon.

=== Scottish edition ===
For more than 20 years the paper has published a separate Scottish edition, which has been edited since January 2012 by Jason Allardyce. While most of the articles that run in the English edition appear in the Scottish edition, its staff also produces about a dozen Scottish news stories, including a front-page article, most weeks.

== Editors ==
1. 1821: Henry White
2. 1822: Daniel Whittle Harvey
3. 1828: Thomas Gaspey
4. 1854: William Carpenter
5. 1856: E. T. Smith
6. 1858: Henry M. Barnett
7. 1864: Joseph Knight and Ashby Sterry (acting editors)
8. 1874: Joseph Hatton
9. 1881: H. W. Oliphant
10. 1887: Phil Robinson
11. 1890: Arthur William à Beckett
12. 1893: Rachel Beer
13. 1901: Leonard Rees
14. 1932: William W. Hadley
15. 1950: Harry Hodson
16. 1961: Denis Hamilton
17. 1967: Harold Evans
18. 1981: Frank Giles
19. 1983: Andrew Neil
20. 1995: John Witherow
21. 2013: Martin Ivens
22. 2020: Emma Tucker
23. 2023: Ben Taylor

== See also ==
- Mrs Mills Solves all Your Problems
- The Sunday Times Motorshow Live
- List of newspapers in Britain
- List of newspapers in Australia
