= Nudity in print media =

Nudity in print media is a phenomenon which has existed in many countries. The nudity can be the result of the inclusion of a glamour model, or for sexual health and wellbeing. In instances of glamour modelling, this has received backlash with No More Page 3 in the United Kingdom, and Stop Bild Sexism in Germany.

== Austria ==
The tabloid newspaper Kronen Zeitung launched its Girl des Tages or Girl of the Day in 1971, featuring a topless glamour model. The feature ended on September 11, 2021 due to declining interest in the feature.

== Czech Republic ==
The tabloid newspaper, Blesk, publishes its "Dívka dne" (Girl of the Day) feature.

== Denmark ==
The tabloid newspaper Ekstra Bladet launched its "Side 9-pigen" (The Page 9 Girl) on July 1, 1976. The level of nudity varies by each publication, and can include models posing fully nude, partially nude, or in underwear.

== Germany ==
The tabloid newspaper Bild featured topless models (dubbed a "Bild Girl") between 1984 and 2018.

The teen magazine Bravo featured nudity, mainly in its That's Me and Dr. Sommer's Bodycheck sections which began in the 1970s, to educate about sexual health and wellbeing.

== Ireland ==
The tabloid newspaper of The Irish Sun removed its topless Page 3 feature in August 2013.

== Latvia ==
The tabloid newspaper Vakara Ziņas has featured its "Vakara Ziņu meitene" (The Vakara Ziņas Girl).

== Netherlands ==
From 1996 to 2006, the teen Break-Out! Magazine featured nudity in a similar capacity to Bravo in Germany, using nudity to educate about sexual health and wellbeing.

== Poland ==
The tabloid newspapers Fakt and Super Express previously featured glamour models and nudity, in a similar fashion to Germany's Bild.

== Romania ==
The Libertatea tabloid featured a "Page 5 girl" ("Fata de la Pagina 5") until 2017, when the feature was discontinued due to a shift in its strategy.

== Russia ==
The Tvoy Den (Your Day) tabloid in Russia, heavily inspired by the UK's The Sun tabloid, used to publish topless models, finishing the feature around March 2014. The Komsomolskaya Pravda also published imagery of glamour models, but not on a daily schedule.

== Serbia ==
The Blic tabloid has featured a topless Page 3 model section.

== Slovakia ==
The Nový čas tabloid features its "Dievča dňa" (Girl of the Day).

== Slovenia ==
The Slovenske novice tabloid previously featured a topless model within its middle page.

== Switzerland ==
On April 18, 1980, Blick featured a glamour model on Page 3. Later, during a 2009 broadsheet redesign, the newspaper moved the feature and rebranded it as "Star des Tages" (Star of the Day), to move it to the front page to attract newsstand buyers. In December 2016, Blick canceled the feature due to changing reader habits.

== United Kingdom ==
Tabloid newspapers in the United Kingdom have a history of featuring topless models; this was mainly due to tabloid newspaper The Sun inventing the feature on November 17, 1970 with Page 3. The feature would also appear in rival publications Daily Mirror, Daily Star, Daily Sport and Sunday Sport. In April 2019, the Daily Star became the last major tabloid to remove its topless Page 3 feature, featuring clothed glamour models instead.
