= Charlie Jacks =

English model and singer

- Born: Charlotte Amy Jacks; 2 November 1985 (age 40); Bromley, East London, England
- Origin: Kent, London, England
- Genres: Pop
- Occupations: Singer, songwriter
- Instrument: Vocals
- Years active: 2005–present
- Label: Sony
- Website: www.charliejacks.com

Charlotte Amy Jacks (born 2 November 1985), commonly known as Charlie Jacks, is an English former Page 3 glamour model turned pop singer, based in southeast London. She began singing as child. She had six number one albums and nine singles at the top of the Japanese iTunes chart. Her single "Come On" sold 35,000 copies in a single day.

In 2012, Jacks signed a management deal with BoomHaus Recordings, Sony Music Japan, Manhattan Records Lexington Corp (JP) She released her single, "Speakerphone", on 16 August 2012 as a free download.

Her mother is the Sun newspaper's official Page 3 photographer, Alison Webster, and her stepfather is the Sun's former deputy editor, Geoff Webster.

== Discography ==
- Charlie's Party (2008)
- Charlie (2011)
- Everyone Falls in Love (2011)
- Charlie 2 (2011)
- Complete Charlie (2008)
- Basketcase (2011)
- Alone (2011)
- The Industry (2008)
- Gimme Gimme (2011)
- Charlie (2011)
- Sweet 10 Covers ~ Music for Lovers (2012)
- Charlie (2013)

=== Singles ===
- "Waiting For Love" (2011)
- "A Perfect Sky" (2011)
- "Last Christmas" (2011)
- "Not Over You" (2013)

=== Extended plays ===
- Speakerphone (2012)
