= Jilly Johnson =

British model and actress

- Born: Jilly Gosden; 17 November 1953 (age 72); Queensland, Australia
- Occupations: Model; actress; writer
- Years active: 1975–present
- Height: 1.73 m (5 ft 8 in)
- Children: 1

Jilly Johnson (née Gosden; born 17 November 1953) is a British former model, actress, musical artist and Page 3 girl.

== Biography ==
Johnson was born Jilly Gosden on 17 November 1953 in Australia. Her family moved back to Surrey, England when she was eight, and she attended Horsell Primary School and Sheerwater Secondary School in Woking, Surrey.

In the 1970s and 1980s together with Nina Carter, she was in the girl group Blonde on Blonde. Johnson was also featured on the album cover for the album Moontan by Dutch hard rock band Golden Earring in 1973.

In 1975, she became the first model to appear topless in the Daily Mirror.

She has written two novels: Double Exposure (1994) and Playing for Love (1997).

Johnson has been married twice and has one daughter from her first marriage, to company director Brian Johnson. She is now a housewife and grandmother. She is also noted for her love of Great Danes.

== Filmography ==
=== Film ===
Year	Title	Role	Notes
1979	The Golden Lady	Herself	Blonde on Blonde (musical duo) with Nina Carter

=== Television ===
Year	Title	Role	Notes
1980	Star Games	Herself	Game show
1986	Auf Wiedersehen Pet	Model	Comedy drama
1994	Digging the Dancing Queens	Herself	Television documentary
2003	Loose Women	Herself	
2006	It's Me or the Dog	Herself	

== Published books ==
- Playing for Love, published by Simon & Schuster (1997)
- Double Exposure, published by Smith Gryphon (1994)
