= Bild =

German tabloid newspaper

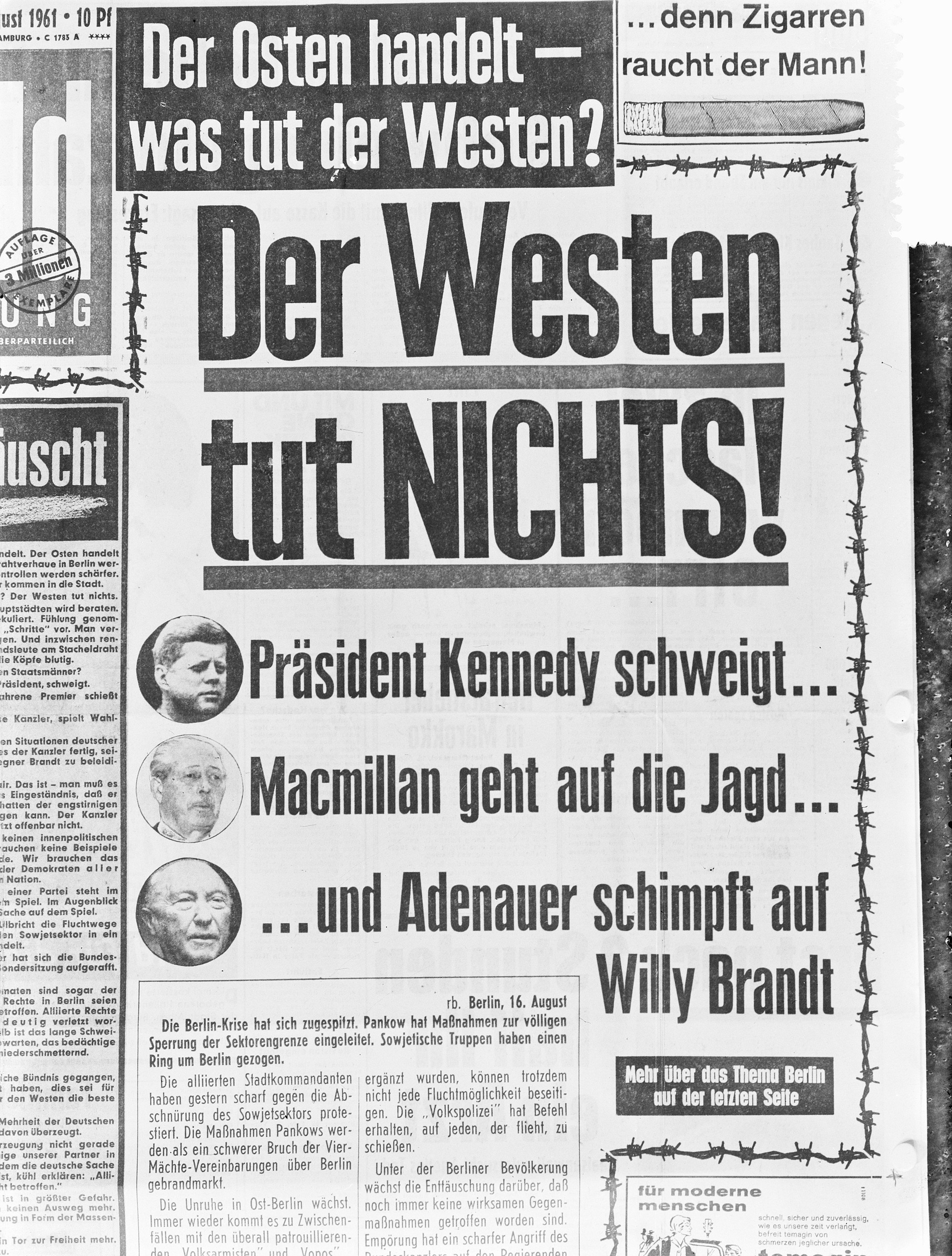
- Front page, 17 August 1961
- Type: Daily tabloid (except Sundays and public holidays)
- Format: Broadsheet ("nordisch" size: 376 x 528 mm)
- Owner: Axel Springer SE
- Editor-in-chief: Marion Horn
- Editor: Robert Schneider
- Founded: 24 June 1952; 74 years ago
- Political alignment: Conservatism; Populism
- Language: German
- Headquarters: Berlin
- Circulation: 1,150,181 (Print, 2021); 458,952 (Digital, 2020)
- Website: www.bild.de

Bild (German: [bɪlt], lit. 'Picture') or Bild-Zeitung (German: [ˈbɪltˌtsaɪtʊŋ], lit. 'Picture Newspaper') is a German tabloid newspaper published by Axel Springer SE. The paper is published from Monday to Saturday; on Sundays, its sister paper Bild am Sonntag (lit. 'Bild on Sunday') is published instead, which has a different style and its own editors. Bild is tabloid in style but broadsheet in size. It is the best-selling European newspaper and has the sixteenth-largest circulation worldwide. Bild has been described as "notorious for its mix of gossip, inflammatory language, and sensationalism" and as having a huge influence on German politicians.

Its nearest English-language stylistic and journalistic equivalent is often considered to be the British national newspaper The Sun, the second-highest-selling European tabloid newspaper.

Like the rest of the Axel Springer properties, Bild follows an editorial line in favor of liberal democracy, Israel, NATO and capitalism.

== History ==
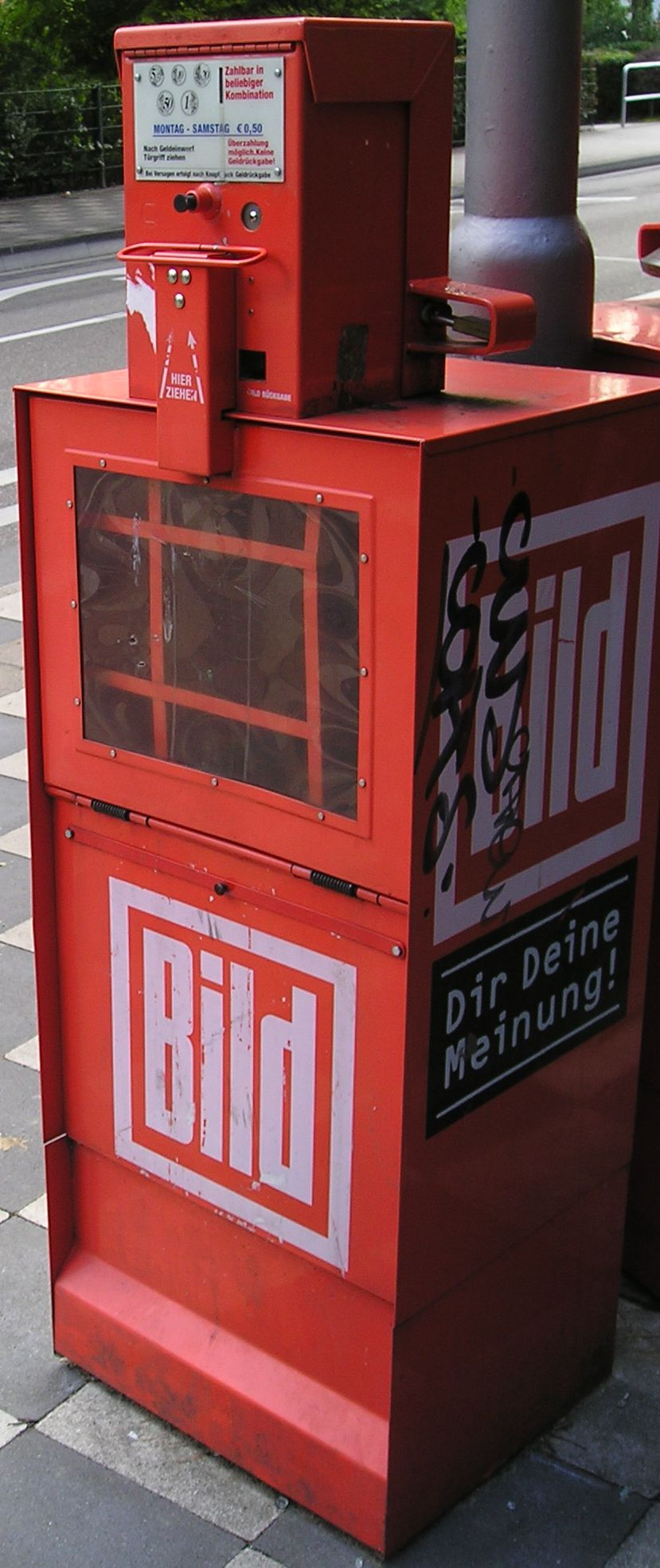
Bild tabloid vending machine in Germany

Bild was founded by Axel Springer (1912–1985) in 1952. It mostly consisted of pictures (hence the name Bild, German for picture). Bild soon became the best-selling tabloid, by a wide margin, not only in Germany, but in all of Europe, though essentially to German readers. Through most of its history, Bild was based in Hamburg. The paper moved its headquarters to Berlin in March 2008, stating that it was an essential base of operations for a national newspaper. It is printed nationwide with 32 localized editions. Special editions are printed in some favoured German holiday destinations abroad such as Spain, Italy, Turkey and Greece.

Bild sold more than five million copies every day in the 1980s. In 1993 the paper had a circulation of slightly more than four million copies, making it the most read newspaper in the country. In the period of 1995–96 its circulation was 4,300,000 copies. In 2001 Bild was the most read newspaper in Europe, and also in Germany, with a circulation of 4,396,000 copies.

Although it is still Germany's biggest paper, the circulation of Bild, along with many other papers, has been on the decline in recent years. By the end of 2005, the figure dropped to 3.8 million copies. Its daily circulation in 2010 was 3,548,000, making the paper the fifth in the list of the world's biggest selling newspapers.

Bild is published in tabloid format. In the paper's beginnings, Springer was influenced by the model of the British tabloid Daily Mirror; although Bild's paper size is larger, this is reflected in its mix of celebrity gossip, crime stories and political analysis. However, its articles are often considerably shorter compared to those in British tabloids, and the whole paper is thinner as well.

In June 2012, Bild celebrated its 60th anniversary by giving away free newspapers to almost all of Germany's 41 million households. Bild said Guinness World Records in Germany has certified the print run as "the largest circulation for the free special edition of a newspaper". In 2018 on average 2.2 million copies of the paper were printed across Germany and 416,567 readers took advantage of the paid digital offer Bild plus. In terms of subscribers, it is the largest in Europe and the fifth largest worldwide.

In 2019 Bild started a weekly politic newspaper, named Bild Politik, which ceased publications after a few months. In 2024 it formalized an alliance with pro-Likud Israeli newspaper Israel Hayom.

=== Editorial leanings ===
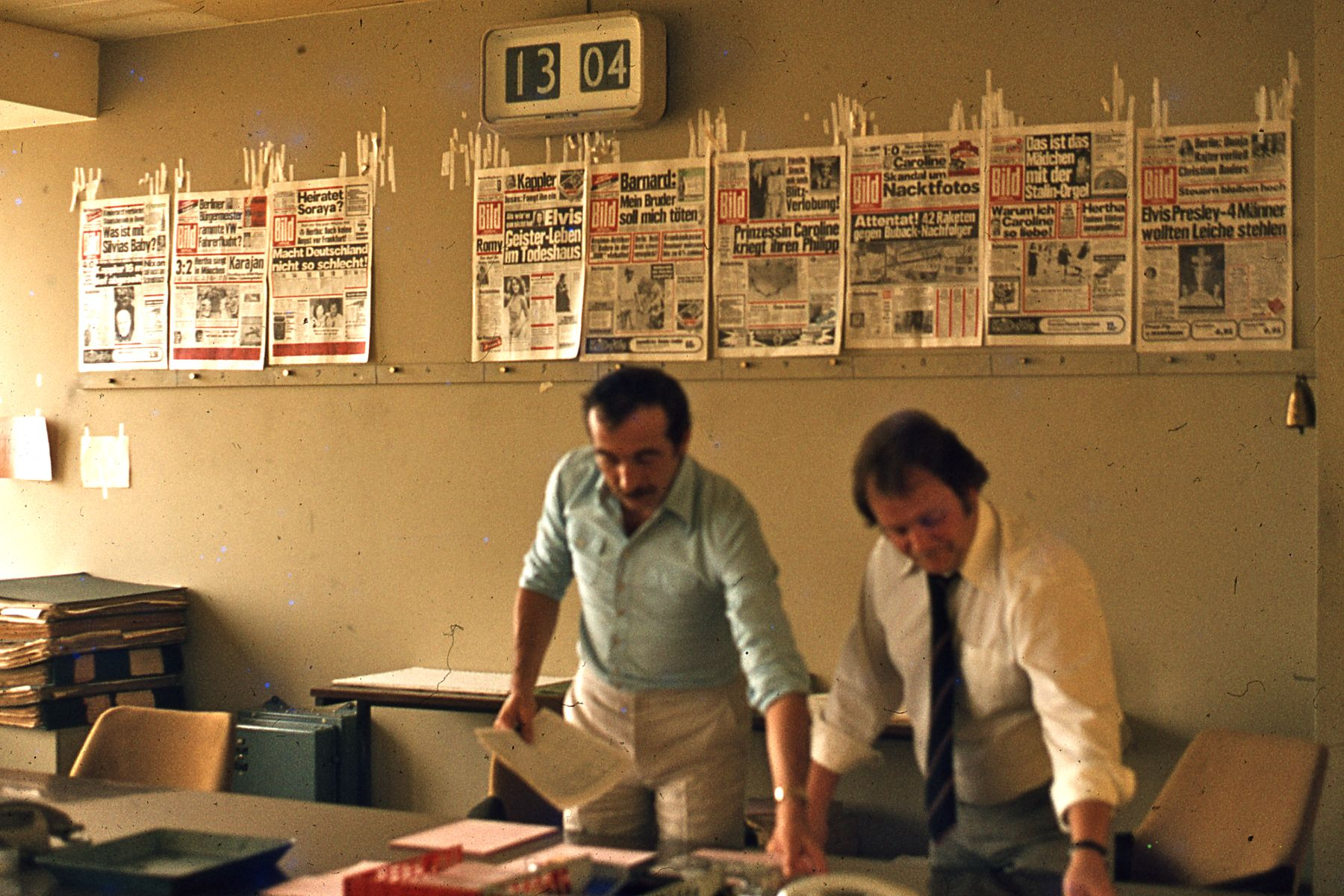
Editors work on producing an issue of Bild, 1977 in West Berlin. Previous front pages are affixed to the wall behind them.

From the outset, the editorial drift was conservative and nationalist. The GDR was referred to as the Soviet Occupation Zone (German: Sowjetische Besatzungszone or SBZ). The usage continued well into the 1980s, when Bild began to use the GDR's official name cautiously, putting it in quotation marks. Bild (along with fellow Springer tabloid B.Z.) heavily influenced public opinion against the West German student movement and left-wing terrorism in the years following 1966, and was blamed by some for the climate that contributed to the assassination attempt on activist Rudi Dutschke in 1968—a popular catchphrase in left-wing circles sympathetic to student radicalism was "Bild hat mitgeschossen!" ("Bild shot at him too!").

In 1977 investigative journalist Günter Wallraff worked for four months as an editor for the Bild tabloid in Hanover, giving himself the pseudonym of "Hans Esser". In his books Der Aufmacher ("Lead Story") and Zeugen der Anklage ("Witnesses for the Prosecution") he portrays his experiences on the editorial staff of the paper and the journalism which he encountered there. The staff commonly displayed contempt for humanity, a lack of respect for the privacy of ordinary people and widespread conduct of unethical research and editing techniques. Wallraff's investigations were also the basis for the 1990 film The Man Inside.

After the fall of the Berlin Wall and the end of the Cold War in Europe, Bild focused on celebrity stories and became less political. Despite its general support for Germany's conservative parties and especially former chancellor Helmut Kohl, its rhetoric, still populist in tone, is less fierce than it was thirty years ago. Its traditionally less conservative Sunday paper Bild am Sonntag even supported Gerhard Schröder, a Social Democrat, in his bid for chancellor in 1998.

In 2004, Bild started to cooperate with fast-food giant McDonald's to sell the tabloid at its 1,000 fast-food restaurants in Germany. The cooperation still goes on, often enough by advertising the restaurant chain in "news" articles. Photos of young, topless women appeared on Bild's page one below the fold as Seite-eins-Mädchen or "Page One Girls". On 9 March 2012 Bild announced the elimination of the "Page One Girls", instead moving its suggestive photos to its inside pages.

In 2004, Bild was publicly reprimanded twelve times by the Deutscher Presserat (German Press Council). This amounts for a third of the reprimands this self-regulation council of the German press declared that year. Up until 2012, it had received more reprimands than any other newspaper from this watchdog body.

In 2011, the left-leaning Der Spiegel magazine accused Bild of pushing Germany further right and questioned Bild's moral standards and journalistic quality.

After Julian Reichelt became editor in 2018, Bild took a generally anti-Angela Merkel line, and strengthened its anti-Putin, pro-NATO, pro-Israel position.

==== International relations ====
- During the COVID-19 pandemic, Bild editor Julian Reichelt accused Chinese leader Xi Jinping of surveillance and other human rights crimes in an editorial titled "What China owes us" on 20 April 2020. After the Chinese embassy to Germany said that the Bild editorial reproached "nationalism, prejudice, and hostility against China", Reichelt responded "You [Xi], your government and your scientists had to know long ago that coronavirus is highly infectious, but you left the world in the dark about it."
- During the 2020 Nagorno-Karabakh conflict, Paul Ronzheimer, the deputy editor-in-chief and correspondent of Bild, tweeted that Ilham Aliyev, the President of Azerbaijan, agreed to be interviewed by the newspaper, and that he suddenly changed his mind, specifying that the Azerbaijani side itself offered to conduct an interview with Aliyev. Then, aide to the Azerbaijani President, Hikmet Hajiyev, responded with a tweet, calling his statement unprofessional and stating that Aliyev preferred to give interviews to professionals rather than the yellow press.
- Since 2021, Bild has been increasingly supportive of Israeli prime minister Benjamin Netanyahu and his Likud party. It was one of the Western media channels that Netanyahu used in 2024 to leak alleged documents about his negotiations with Hamas that later turned out to be a disinformation campaign.
- In August 2025, Bild published an article questioning the authenticity of photos from the Gaza Strip, accusing Anas Zayed Fteiha, a photojournalist working for Turkey's Anadolu Agency, of staging his photos of the Gaza Strip famine. The articles were cited by Israel's Ministry of Foreign Affairs as evidence of "Pallywood". Fteiha denied the accusations and accused Bild of repeated breaches of journalistic ethics. The claims made in the Bild report were debunked by the Israeli fact-checking organization FakeReporter and the French newspaper Libération.

== Motto ==
Its motto, prominently displayed below the logo, is unabhängig, überparteilich ("independent, nonpartisan"). Another slogan used prominently in advertising is Bild dir deine Meinung!, which translates as "Form your own opinion!" (by reading Bild), a pun based on the fact that, in German, Bild is a homophone of the imperative form of the verb bilden (English: to form, to build, to educate) and the noun Bild (English: picture, image).

== Print locations ==
Bild is printed in Ahrensburg, Hanover, Berlin, Leipzig, Essen, Neu-Isenburg, Esslingen, Munich, and Syke. Outside of Germany it is also printed in Madrid, Palma de Mallorca, Las Palmas, Milan, Athens, and in Antalya. The foreign locations cater mostly for German tourists and expatriates.

== Editors-in-chief ==
- 1952: Rolf von Bargen
- 1952–1958: Rudolf Michael
- 1958–1960: Oskar Bezold
- 1960–1962: Karl-Heinz Hagen
- 1961–1971: Peter Boenisch
- 1971–1980: Günter Prinz
- 1981–1988: Horst Fust
- 1988–1989: Werner Rudi
- 1989–1990: Peter Bartels
- 1990–1992: Hans-Hermann Tiedje
- 1992–1997: Claus Larass
- 1998–2000: Udo Röbel
- 2001–2015: Kai Diekmann
- 2016–2018: Tanit Koch
- 2018–March 2021: Julian Reichelt
- March–October 2021: Julian Reichelt and Alexandra Würzbach
- October 2021 – March 2023 : Johannes Boje and Alexandra Würzbach
- March/April 2023 – present: Marion Horn and Robert Schneider

== Reception ==
Der Spiegel wrote in 2006 that Bild "flies just under the nonsense threshold of American and British tabloids ... For the German desperate, it is a daily dose of high-resolution soft porn".

It is argued Bild's thirst for sensationalism results in the terrorizing of prominent celebrities and stories are frequently based on the most dubious evidence. The journalistic standards of Bild are the subject of frequent criticism.

BILDblog is a popular German blog that when founded was dedicated solely to documenting errors and fabrications in Bild articles. In 2005 BILDblog received the Grimme Online Award for its work. Since 2009 BILDblog has also reported on errors and fabrications in other newspapers from Germany and elsewhere.

Heinrich Böll's 1974 novel The Lost Honor of Katharina Blum, and the 1975 movie based on it, used a fictional stand-in for Bild to make a point about its allegedly unethical journalistic practices. Böll's essay in the edition of 10 January 1972 of Der Spiegel (titled "Will Ulrike Gnade oder freies Geleit?) was sharply critical of Bild's sensationalist coverage of the Baader-Meinhof Gang. In the essay, Böll stated that what Bild does "isn't cryptofascist anymore, not fascistoid, but naked fascism. Agitation, lies, dirt."

Judith Holofernes, lead singer of German band Wir sind Helden, wrote a scathing open letter to Bild's advertising agency after they asked her to star in a campaign. "Bild is not a harmless guilty pleasure", she wrote, but a "dangerous political instrument—not only a high-magnification telescope into the abyss but an evil creature".

Writer Max Goldt has described the paper as "an organ of infamy" and posited that "one has to be as impolite to its editors as is legally possible; they are bad people who do wrong".

=== Images of topless women ===
For 28 years from 1984 to 2012, Bild had topless women featuring on its first page; in total, the paper published more than 5,000 topless pictures.

In 2014, Sophia Becker and Kristina Lunz launched a campaign, Stop Bild Sexism, to end the use of sexualized images of women in Bild. The campaign was inspired by the No More Page 3 campaign to get The Sun in the United Kingdom to stop publishing images of half-naked women on page 3. Lunz argues that Bild's frequent use of images of unclothed women makes its reporting of sexual assault and harassment "sexist and voyeuristic." Becker says that Bild contributes to the normalisation of sexism in German society. The petition had over 35,000 signatures in January 2015, and Springer, the newspaper's publisher, responded by issuing a statement of values. These include the importance of mutual respect and maintaining respectful interactions. Bild stopped publishing "topless productions of our own with women" in March 2018, three years after The Sun, while continuing to publish photos of provocatively-posed models dressed in underwear alone.

== Television channel ==
In August 2021, Axel Springer SE launched a Bild television channel, a free-to-air 24-hour TV program. However, ratings fell short of expectations, and the media company discontinued the channel at the end of 2023.

== In popular culture ==
- In their 2007 song Lasse redn (topped at no. 6 of the German charts), punk rock band Die Ärzte summarized Bild's content as "fear, hate, tits and the weather report" (German: Aus Angst, Hass, Titten und dem Wetterbericht).
- Bild Lilli was the inspiration for Ruth Handler's Barbie doll.
- The newspaper is featured in the 2012 novel Look Who's Back (German: Er ist weider da) and its subsequent 2015 movie adaptation.

== Building ==
The Berlin offices have a 19-storey paternoster lift, whose continued operation was vigorously defended editorially by the newspaper.

== Controversies ==
=== Coverage during the Gaza War ===
Bild has been criticized for its coverage of the Gaza war over false information, biased content and enabling of the narrative for the Gaza genocide. In August 2025, Anas al-Sharif, an Al Jazeera correspondent was killed by an Israeli strike and Bild published the headline "Terrorist disguised as journalist killed in Gaza", which was remarked for helping legitimize Israel's killings of Palestinian journalists. In September 2025, a journalist filed a legal claim against the newspaper over accusations of being a Hamas propagandist. The same month, despite UN agencies NGOs issuing warnings of famine, the outlet published articles denying those reports.

== See also ==
- List of German newspapers
- Media of Germany
