= Bishop David Brown School =

Secondary school in Surrey, England

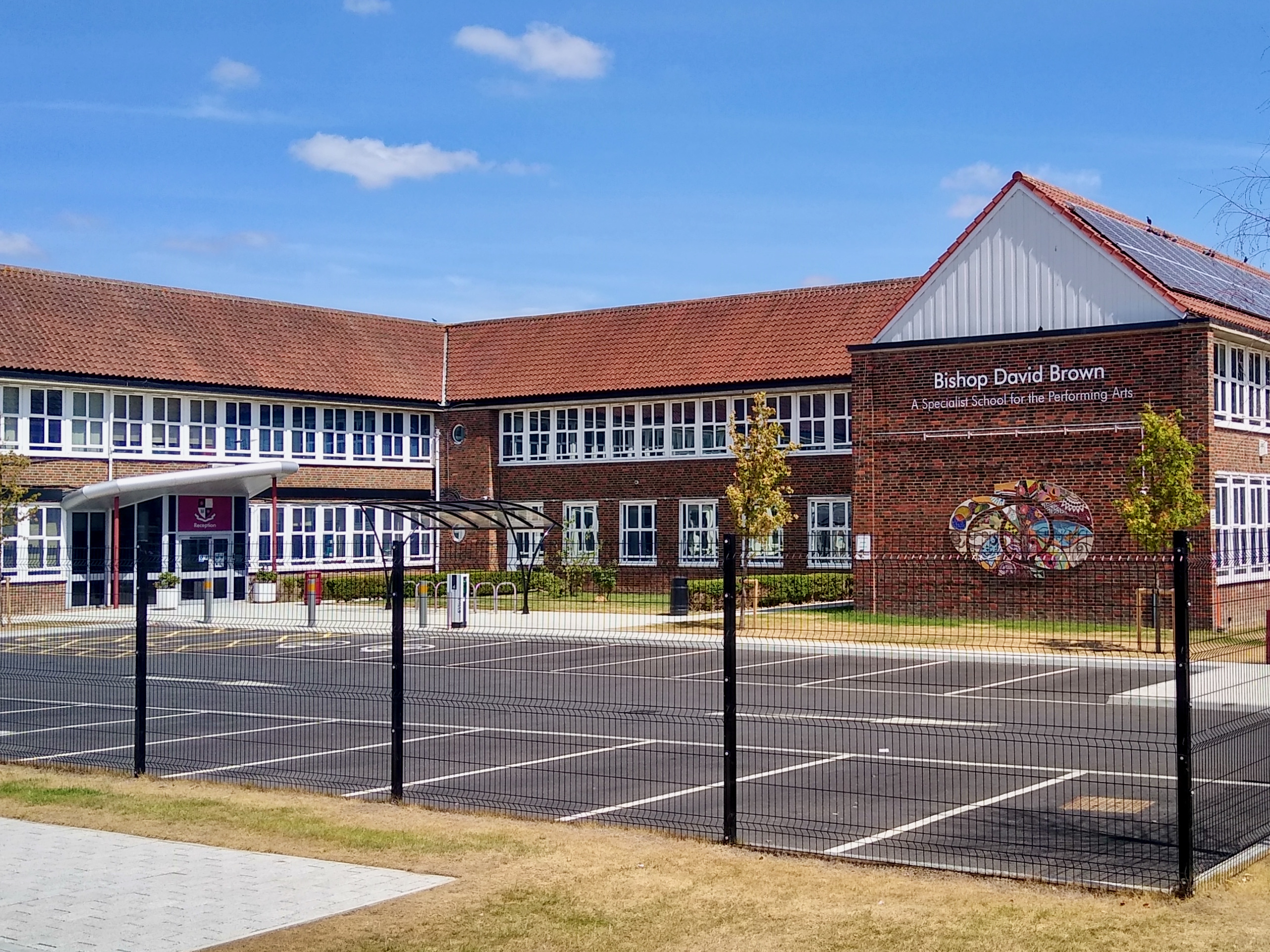

Location
- Albert Drive; Woking, Surrey, GU21 5RF; England; 51.33607°N 0.5245°W

Information
- Other name: BDB
- Former name: Sheerwater Secondary School
- Type: Academy / Secondary comprehensive
- Motto: "Enabling All To Excel"
- Established: 1982; 44 years ago
- Local authority: Surrey
- Department for Education URN: 142284 Tables
- Ofsted: Reports
- Assistant Heads: Rachel Gomm (Teaching and Learning)
- Principal: Charlie Venter
- Staff: 71
- Gender: Mixed
- Age: 11 (Year 7) to 16 (Year 11)
- Enrolment: 608
- Houses: Mars (red); Venus (green); Neptune (blue); Jupiter (yellow)
- Colours: Black, cream, red, white
- Website: bdb-unity.co.uk

The Bishop David Brown School is a mixed academy status secondary school located in Sheerwater (Woking), Surrey, England.

== History ==
Formerly the Sheerwater Secondary School, in 1982 Sheerwater merged with the Queen Elizabeth II School and changed its name to the Bishop David Brown School, named in honour of David Brown, the Church of England Bishop of Guildford from 1973–82. The school name is commonly abbreviated to BDB.

Previously a community school administered by Surrey County Council, in October 2015 the Bishop David Brown School was converted to academy status and is currently designated with a specialist Performing Arts status. The school is now part of the Unity Schools Trust, but continues to coordinate with Surrey County Council for admissions.

Newspapers and documents dating from 1958 include the Bishop David Brown School (under its original name as "Sheerwater County Secondary School") for its summer fete. There are also accounts from previous students dating back to 1954.

In the early 1990s, several trees were planted on the grounds of the school in memory of students that died. One of the trees was a tulip tree planted in 1992 in memory of Luke Willis, who died after suffering an asthma attack, and the other one a sweet gum tree, planted six years later for Jemma Doyle, who died of meningitis aged 14.

There are some images of the original school motto being Latin: Ut omnes unum sint, translated into English as "That all may be one".

=== Former headteachers ===
Previously noted headteachers include:

- Mr J. W. Bachelor, B.Sc (1954)
- Mr. G. P. Osbourne, B.A (1968)
- Ms R. Bradbury (1982)
- Mr G.D Ellis B.A (1995/96)
- Mr S Shepard (2015)

=== The Jam ===
In 1972, when the school was named Sheerwater Secondary School, the band The Jam was formed. The line-up was fluid at this stage, consisting of 14-year-old Paul Weller on bass and lead vocals together with various friends at the school. They played their first gigs at Michael's, a local working men's club. In 1975 the line-up began to solidify after changing the line-up, with the band now consisting of Weller, Steve Brookes (who later left the group), Rick Buckler and Bruce Foxton. The band was very much inspired by Mod artists, such as The Who, and wore suits on stage as part of this aesthetic. The band wrote and released one of their biggest hits called 'Town Called Malice' which was inspired by Woking.

== Location and timetable ==
The school is situated 5 minutes from Horsell Common and 10 minutes from Woking Town Centre and railway station.

The students currently follow a two-week timetable.

== Staff ==
Currently, at the school, there are over 150 members of staff, either working as teachers, learning and teaching assistants, associate staff, administration, finance and, IT support, and a small team of on-site support.

== Uniform ==
The Bishop David Brown School uniform consists of the colours black, cream and red. Students wear an all-black uniform including a black blazer with the school crest on it.

The crest includes a red-lined, black and cream chequered shield with images of a book, a Bishop's hat (to commemorate who the school is named after) and two red stars (pictured at the top). It also has the school motto ("Enabling All To Excel") written underneath.

== Ofsted ==
In the early 2000s, the school was put into special measures by OFSTED. Stuart Shepard was appointed as head to tackle the issue. By 2007, the school was now rated "Good" by OFSTED and the inspection stated, "The school is inspiring, motivating and caring". The most recent inspection in January 2019 rated the school as "Good – with outstanding features".

== Notable alumni ==
- Rick Buckler – drummer with The Jam
- Bruce Foxton – bass player with The Jam
- Paul Weller – lead singer of The Jam

- Jilly Johnson - model
- Rick Parfitt - guitarist with Status Quo
- Richard Short – actor

== Partnerships ==
The School is part of the Unity Schools Trust (a geographically based Multi-Academy Trust (MAT), formed in September 2015) with The Magna Carta School. The trustees of the Unity Schools Trust delegate some governance activities to a local governing body. The trustees remain accountable for the educational standards of the school.

Bishop David Brown formed a new Learning Partnership with four local secondary schools: Collingwood College, The Magna Carta School, Winston Churchill School and Kings International College. Various trips and workshops such as lectures and student council meetings are arranged between the four schools.

== Extra-curricular activities ==
The school has staged productions of Grease, the musicals Little Shop of Horrors, Rent, Mary Poppins, Aladdin Jr, Moana Jr, and several pantomimes written by staff like Peter Panto and The Lion, The Witch and The Wardrobe. It produces one annual Christmas musical. As of 2019, the school will produce one spring play each year.

The school holds an annual International Evening to celebrate different cultures and countries of the world.

The school also participates in The Duke of Edinburgh's Award scheme.
