= Kirsten Imrie =

British page three girl

- Born: Kirsten Fifi Imrie; 26 October 1967 (age 59); Kensington, London, England
- Other name: Kirsten Stewart
- Occupations: Glamour model; television presenter
- Height: 5 ft 7 in (1.70 m)

Kirsten Fifi Imrie (born 26 October 1967) is a British former Page 3 girl, glamour model, and television presenter.

== Career ==
Kirsten Fifi Imrie was born on 26 October 1967 at St Mary Abbots Hospital in the Kensington area of London, and raised in Musselburgh, East Lothian, Scotland from the age of three. After leaving school at the age of 16, she worked in various blue-collar jobs in the Edinburgh area. Aged 18, she married a local man from Haddington, East Lothian, but the marriage soon dissolved.

Imrie then moved to London and began a glamour modelling career. She started appearing as a Page 3 girl in The Sun in November 1988, shortly after her 21st birthday, and continued to appear regularly on Page 3 until August 1993. She also posed nude for a wide range of men's magazines, including the US edition of Penthouse, which featured her as its cover girl and Penthouse Pet for December 1989 (modelling under the pseudonym Kirsten Stewart). She continued to pose for glamour photographs through her late 30s, appearing in the April 2007 edition of Mayfair magazine at the age of 39.

Imrie also worked as a television presenter. In 1995, she appeared on the newly launched adult television channel Television X. In 1996, L!VE TV recruited Imrie as a television sports presenter. She replaced another former Page 3 girl, Gail McKenna, who had moved to the channel Five.

== Controversy and personal struggles ==
In the late 1980s and early 1990s, British tabloid newspapers regularly featured stories about Imrie's jet-setting lifestyle, her alleged alcohol and cocaine abuse, her celebrity relationships, and even her alleged lesbian affairs with other glamour models.

In the 1990s, Imrie struggled with debt. On 27 September 1994, when she appeared in a London court on charges of driving under the influence (DUI), her solicitor told the court that she was no longer receiving regular modelling work, was struggling under a "mountain of debt," was living on unemployment benefits, and was "almost on the breadline".

In November 2000, tabloid newspapers ran stories reporting that Imrie was penniless and sleeping rough on Clapham Common, having sold her house to pay off debts. The tabloids later claimed that readers' donations had enabled Imrie to rent a flat in South London, resume her modelling career, and turn her life around.

In 2003, Imrie spoke about her homelessness and addiction problems in the UK television documentary The Curse of Page 3.
