= Blonde on Blonde (disambiguation) =

Blonde on Blonde is a 1966 studio album by American singer-songwriter Bob Dylan.

Blonde on Blonde may also refer to:

- Blonde on Blonde (rock group), a 1960s psychedelic rock group
- Blonde on Blonde (girl group), a 1970s girl group consisting of the glamour models Nina Carter and Jilly Johnson
- "Blonde on Blonde", a song by Nada Surf on the 2002 album Let Go
