= Kathy Lloyd =

Northern Irish glamour model and television presenter

- Born: Katheryn Patricia Alexandria Lloyd; 13 November 1967 (age 58); Carrickfergus, Northern Ireland
- Occupations: Glamour model; television presenter
- Height: 5 ft 8 in (1.73 m)

Katheryn Patricia Alexandria Lloyd (born 13 November 1967) is a Northern Irish former Page 3 girl, glamour model and television presenter.

== Biography ==
Kathy Lloyd was born in Carrickfergus, Northern Ireland and grew up in Netherton, Bootle where she attended Warwick Bolam High School.

Lloyd left school at 16 and worked at the Top Shop clothing store in Liverpool before venturing into modelling. Some of her early photos were taken by Beverley Goodway, a famous UK glamour photographer who persuaded her to send some photos to The Sun. She first appeared as a Page 3 girl in The Sun in early 1986, at the age of 18, where she quickly became a regular and voted page 3 girl of the year three times in 1986, 1990 and 1994.

Later she appeared in "Lads' magazines" such as Maxim, Loaded, and FHM; and hosted two television talk shows for Granada Television's Men & Motors satellite station in 2002, Talking Dirty, and Kathy Lloyd's Naughty Business. She also appeared at Anfield to launch the new home kit of Liverpool F.C. ahead of the 1996–97 season, alongside Reds players John Scales and Steve Harkness.

== Television appearances ==
Lloyd appeared on TV shows such as The Word in 1990 and 1994, was the recipient of a Gotcha on Noel's House Party in 1992, and was a guest on Shooting Stars and Celebrity Squares in 1995 and TFI Friday in 1996.
