= Page Three (band) =

British pop band

- Genre: Pop
- Years active: 1976–1977
- Label: Warner Bros.
- Past members: Clare Russell; Felicity Buirski; Stephanie Marrian

Page Three was a British girl group briefly active in the late 1970s. They had a national hit with "Hold on to Love".

== Background ==
The group was made up of three Page 3 models from UK tabloid, The Sun (Felicity Buirski, Clare Russell and Stefani Marrian), who met up while on a modelling shoot in Portugal in 1976.

Stephanie Marrian, who was born Stefanie Khan in 1948, was the first Page Three model in The Sun. Her appearance was in the 17 November 1970 issue of the tabloid. Felicity Buirski was the daughter of a musician. In her teens she was a journalist but left that when she entered into the world of modelling.

== Career ==
Felicity Buirsky's brother, who had industry connections, agreed to manage the group, and, after sending a demo disc to various labels, the trio was picked up by Warner Brothers. They recorded two tracks with Bruce Welch and Brian Bennett of The Shadows, and, although they preferred "Oh My Baby" as a single, the a-side choice was "Hold On to Love".

=== "Hold On to Love" ===
After an initial trademark claim from the Sun, the parties reached an agreement, and the single bag was designed in imitation of the Sun's tabloid style. The group performed the single on Seaside Special and Top Of The Pops in August 1977.

The song came close to getting into the top 50 of the UK pop chart, making the Bubbling Under listings that month. For the week of 13 August, the record reached the Record Mirror Star Breaker chart. For the week of 27 August, it was at the top of both the Record Mirror and Music Week Star Breakers charts, thereby effectively being number 51 on the national charts. While it dropped off the Music Week Star Breakers chart, it stayed at the top of the Record Mirror Star Breakers chart for another week. The single's failure to make more of an impact, despite the publicity, meant that the release remained a one-off.

==== Further activities ====
While their single was starting to work its way up the charts it was reported in the 30 July issue of Record Mirror that the group wanted to do something heavier next time and they wanted more control.

== Later years ==
In 1987, Felicity Buirski's solo album, Repairs & Alterations was released on the Run River Records label. This marked the start of her career as a folk musician.

Stephanie Marrian would work as an actor, appearing as Lady Marie in the Mel Brooks 1981 film, History of the World, Part I, and hosting The Cut Price Comedy Show in 1982.

== Line up ==
- Felicity Buirski
- Clare Russell
- Stefani Marrian

== Discography ==
=== Singles ===
Year	Single	Peak chart positions
Year	Single	UK
1977	"Hold On To Love"	51
(number 1 in the Star Breakers chart)

== See also ==
- Blonde on Blonde (girl group)
