= Nina Carter =

British glamour model and singer

- Born: Penelope Jane Mallett; 4 October 1952 (age 74); Solihull, Warwickshire, England
- Other name: Penny Mallett
- Occupations: Glamour model; singer
- Height: 5 ft 8 in (1.73 m)
- Spouse(s): Terry Trenerry (divorced) Rick Wakeman (m. 1984; div. 2004) Douglas Harrison (m. 2010)
- Children: 2
- Website: ninacarter.com

Nina Carter (born Penelope Jane Mallett; 4 October 1952) is an English model and occasional singer.

== Career ==
Carter entered her first beauty competition at the advice of one of her teachers. She quickly found success, being crowned Miss Bournemouth, Miss Southampton, and Miss Poole. After signing with a modelling agency she was featured on Pirelli Calendars, swimwear catalogues, and television adverts, from which she began to do topless modelling. She appeared nude on the cover of Mayfair in 1971 (Vol. 6, No. 9) as Penny Mallett, as well as featuring in a fully nude pictorial occupying the centre pages. This was her second nude photoshoot, but later claimed that she was unaware the photos "were going to be anything but tasteful" or they would appear "in one of the really naughty magazines". Later, as Nina Carter, she was a popular topless Page 3 girl in The Sun; the Evening Times article stated her measurements were 34-23-34, earning her the nickname "The Body".

In 1978, Carter formed Blonde on Blonde, a pop duo with fellow Page 3 girl Jilly Johnson. They achieved success in Japan before they disbanded in the 1980s. Carter developed a drug addiction during this time, and lost a car and her apartment. Following an emergency operation on her throat, which required several months of recuperation, she recalled: "I realised that I had to make a break with my old life" and started a cosmetics business.

In 1981, Carter appeared in the video for the Ph.D. song "I Won't Let You Down", as the girlfriend of vocalist Jim Diamond. Later that year she had a cameo in An American Werewolf in London, featuring in a television advertisement for a kiss-and-tell article ("The Naked Truth About Naughty Nina") in the News of the World prior to David Naughton's first "transformation" into the titular beast.

== Personal life ==
As a youngster Carter was taken to a local Anglican church by her father, "although it did not mean much to me until many years later" and has since renewed her Christian faith.

Carter started dating Terry Trenerry, a quantity surveyor, when she was 16 and the two married, but the marriage ended in the late 1970s. She had a relationship with company director Brian Johnson, who was previously married to her bandmate Jilly Johnson. In 1984, Carter married former Yes keyboardist Rick Wakeman and they had one daughter and one son. They separated in 2000 and their divorce finalised in 2004.

In June, 2010 she married plastic surgeon Douglas Harrison.
