= Bild am Sonntag =

German newspaper

- Type: Sunday newspaper
- Format: Tabloid
- Owner: Axel Springer AG
- Editor: Marion Horn
- Founded: 29 April 1956; 70 years ago
- Circulation: 1,066,330 (Q2 2016)
- Sister newspapers: Bild
- ISSN: 0341-4906
- Website: bams.de

Bild am Sonntag (BamS, lit. 'Image on Sunday') is the largest-selling German national Sunday newspaper published in Berlin, Germany.

== History and profile ==
Bild am Sonntag was first published on 29 April 1956. The paper is published weekly by Axel Springer AG and is a sister paper to the Monday-to-Saturday Bild. Its editor from 2008 to 2013 was Walter Mayer. The new editorship is taken by Marion Horn since 2013. The paper publishes the Goldenes Lenkrad (Golden Steering Wheel) award each year.

== Circulation ==
The Bild am Sonntag as well as the Bild are amongst the German newspapers with the largest losses in circulation in recent years.

During the second quarter of 1992 the circulation of Bild am Sonntag was 2.6 million copies. Its circulation was 2.5 million copies in 1997.

Bild am Sonntag had an average circulation of 2,023,000 copies in 2003, 2,161,502 copies during the third quarter of 2004 and 2,042,128 copies during the third quarter of 2005. Its circulation was 2,014,352 copies during the third quarter of 2006, and was 2,164,000 copies for 2006 as a whole.

The circulation fell to 1,873,354 copies during the third quarter of 2007 and to 1,780,934 copies during the third quarter of 2008. The circulation of the paper was 1,577,764 copies in 2010 and 1,388,009 copies in 2012. During the second quarter of 2016, the paper circulation had plummeted to 1,066,330 copies.

== Editors-in-Chief ==
- Rudolf Michael (1956–1958)
- Oskar Bezold (1958–1960)
- Hans Bluhm (1960–1964)
- Peter Boenisch (1965–1970)
- Peter Bachér (1970–1974)
- Ewald Struwe (1974–1984)
- Willi Schmitt and Wolfgang Kryszohn (1984–1987 as co-editors)
- Willi Schmitt (sole editor 1987–1989)
- Michael H. Spreng (1989–2000)
- Claus Strunz (2000–2008)
- Walter Mayer (2008–2013)
- Marion Horn (since 2013)
