= Alison Webster =

Alison Webster may refer to:

- Alison Webster (Coronation Street), a character in the British soap opera Coronation Street
- Alison Webster (photographer), official Page 3 photographer for The Sun newspaper
