= Stephanie Marrian =

Model and actress (born 1948)

- Born: Stefanie Khan; 9 October 1948 (age 77); Singapore
- Occupations: Model; pop star; actress
- Height: 5 ft 2 in (1.57 m)

Stephanie Marrian (born Stefanie Khan; 9 October 1948) is a former model, pop star and actress. She was the first Page 3 model in The Sun newspaper.

== Modelling career ==
Marrian was the first Page 3 model in The Sun newspaper in the 17 November 1970 edition, where she was named as Stephanie Rahn. Marrian was using her father's surname of Khan at the time; a subeditor at the newspaper misread her surname as Rahn. From 1973 to 1978, using the name Stefanie Marrian, her mother's surname, she appeared regularly as the Page 3 girl. In this role she was featured in the 2017 stage production of Ink, played by Pearl Chanda and directed by Rupert Goold, at the Almeida Theatre, London.

Marrian was a glamour model throughout the 1970s, appearing topless and nude in magazines, papers and calendars world-wide. Along with two other Page Three models, Felicity Buirski and Clare Russell, she was a member of a pop group called Page Three. The group had a national hit with "Hold on to Love" in 1977.

She appeared on the cover of the Top of the Pops, an exploito record album Volume 43 (Hallmark Records SHM 895), released in January 1975. From the same photo-shoot, another picture of her was used to grace the cover of another similar release in Germany, Hit Power: 16 Super Hits International on the Telefunken label.

== Film and television roles ==
Marrian played the part of Lesley in the 1974 film, Can You Keep It Up for a Week?. She played the part of Lady Marie in the Mel Brooks 1981 film, History of the World, Part I.

== Family and personal life ==
Marrian was born in Singapore to an Indian father and an English mother; other sources erroneously stated that she was German and her birth surname was Rahn.

== List of television and film appearances ==
British TV programmes include:

- as Cross's girl in Callan (1970)
- as a student in Some Mothers Do 'Ave 'Em (1973)
- The Cut Price Comedy Show (1982)

Films include:

- as Susan in Confessions Of A Sex Maniac (1974), starring Roger Lloyd-Pack
- as Lesley in Can You Keep It Up for a Week? (1974), starring Jeremy Bulloch
- as Girl in Hotel in The World Is Full of Married Men (1979)
- as Lady Marie in the Mel Brooks film History of the World, Part I (1981)
- as Hotel Receptionist in Green Ice (1981), starring Ryan O'Neal
