= Lucy Collett =

English glamour model

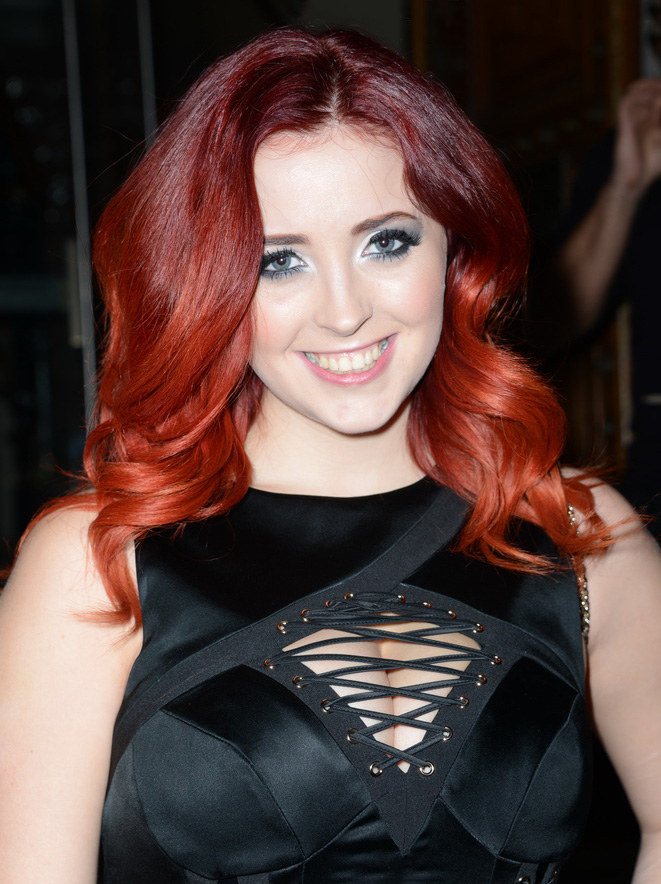
- Collett in 2014
- Born: Lucy Victoria Collett; Warwick, England
- Other names: Lucy Vixen; Lucy V
- Occupation: Glamour model
- Years active: 2005–present
- Modeling information
- Height: 5 ft 6 in (1.68 m)
- Hair color: Red
- Eye color: Grey
- Website: lucy-v.com

Lucy Victoria Collett, also known as Lucy V and Lucy Vixen, is a British glamour model from Warwick, England.

She won The Sun newspaper's Page 3 Idol 2012 modeling contest, and she frequently appeared as a Page 3 girl in that newspaper. She has been featured regularly in men's magazines, such as Nuts, Zoo, Front, Loaded, and Maxim. In addition to her own subscription based website, she has modelled for several internet based erotic websites, such as Suicide Girls, Pinup Wow, Onlytease, CurvedFX, and Xtreme Playpen.

In May 2013, FHM magazine named her one of its 100 Sexiest Women in the World, placing 89th on the list.

== Career ==
Collett attended Myton School in Warwick. She began her modeling career at age 17 as a hair model for Toni & Guy salons. At this time, she began dyeing her naturally brown hair blond and, later, her signature red colour. In December 2011, at the age of 22, she was declared the winner of The Sun's Page 3 Idol 2012 competition and became a Page 3 girl.

FHM called her part of a "welcome new trend for curvaceous womanliness." Collett has always tried to "send out the message that you don't have to be a size six to be a model" and that she wants to promote a healthy body image for girls and women.

Collett has presented Nuts magazine's web series of games news and reviews, "Girl Got Game", and, in March 2015, she began presenting ZOO magazine's web series "Game On". In February 2015, she presented a one-off video feature with Talksport.

== Personal life ==
On 19 May 2005, Collett's 17-year-old brother Jacob was assaulted by another teenager following an altercation outside a pub in Leamington. He suffered a brain haemorrhage and died in Warwick Hospital around 1am on 20 May 2005. His assailant was subsequently convicted of manslaughter and received a six-year prison sentence.

== See also ==
- Nuts (magazine) § Models
