= Brilliant Creatures =

Brilliant Creatures is a children's wildlife TV show that aired in the UK on ITV's children's slot CITV between 13 July 1998 and 10 March 2004. It was produced by The Foundation, and was distributed by Entertainment Rights overseas. The original presenters were Terry Nutkins and Gail McKenna. Presenters in later series included Chris Rogers in series 2 and from series 4, the show was revamped with a new logo and a new format. It then continued to be presented by McKenna and Stephen Mulhern until the series end. The show was repeated on the CITV channel until 2012.

== Series Guide ==
- Series 1 - 7 editions – 13 July 1998 – 24 August 1998
- Series 2 - 7 editions – 12 July 1999 – 23 August 1999
- Series 3 - 7 editions – 25 July 2000 – 5 September 2000
- Series 4 - 10 editions – 4 June 2001 – 15 June 2001
- Series 5 - 10 editions – 12 June 2002 – 2 August 2002
- Series 6 - 10 editions – 7 January 2004 – 10 March 2004
