= Guildhall Library =

Public reference library in London, England

Coordinates: 51.5159°N 0.0928°W

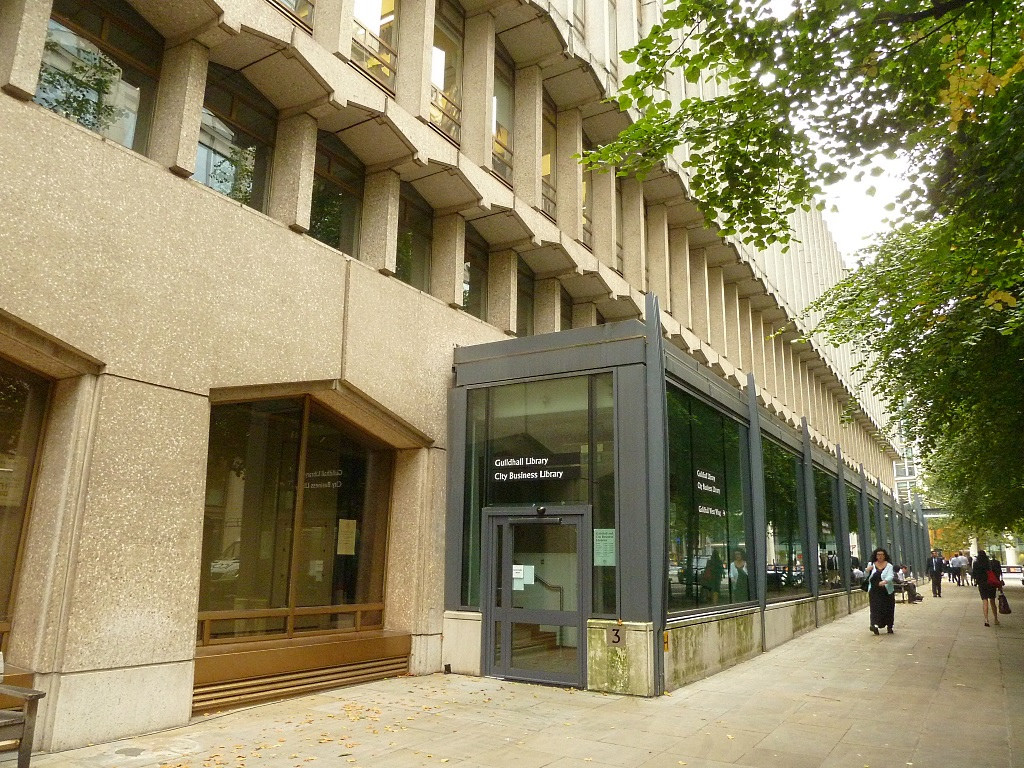
Guildhall Library entrance

The Guildhall Library is a public reference library in London, England, specialising in subjects relevant to London and its history. It is administered by the Corporation of London, the government of the City of London, which is the historical heart of London. The collection has its greatest depth on topics specifically concerned with the City, but also contains much material on other parts of metropolitan London.

== History ==
=== Fifteenth and sixteenth centuries ===
There have been several incarnations of Guildhall Library. The first library at Guildhall was founded around 1425, when a "new house or library" was instigated by John Carpenter (Town Clerk) and John Coventry under the terms of the will of "the rich and pious merchant" Richard Whittington. This "fayre and large librarye", as John Stow called it, began in a building on the south side of Guildhall Chapel. There is no surviving catalogue of the contents of this collection, but it seems to have been a library for students of the divine scriptures and so it is logical to conclude that it was a library of theological books (as most libraries were at that time, before the development of printing). This library was described by contemporaries as the Libararia communis (the common library) at Guildhall.

The library is recorded in Stow's Survey of London (1598). Stow describes a "fair and large library, furnished with books, pertaining to the Guildhall and college". He reports that during the reign of Edward VI (around 1549) the whole collection was "sent for" by the Lord Protector, the Duke of Somerset. The books were loaded on to carts and taken away but were not returned. It is probable that the Duke "borrowed" the books to furnish Somerset House, his new palace on the Strand. It seems other collections were "borrowed" from elsewhere for the same purpose. By 1550 the building had been let to Sir John Aylif, surgeon to Henry VIII, as a market house for the sale of clothes which also suggests that the first library had come to an end by this time.

Only one book from the original collection has since returned to Guildhall Library: a thirteenth-century copy of Petrus Riga's Aurora, a metrical Latin version of the Bible, purchased from an antiquarian dealer. The Corporation does not appear to have attempted to recover the library from Somerset, and there was a gap of around 300 years before another library was formed.

=== Nineteenth century ===
It was not until 1824 that the Corporation of London appointed a committee to "inquire into the best method of arranging and carrying into effect in the Guildhall, a Library of all matters relating to this City, the Borough of Southwark, and the County of Middlesex". It was funded by the corporation out of the Privy Purse and not from the ratepayers (the library did not become rate-supported until 1921). The committee collected a number of valuable books and in 1828 the library was opened for use initially only by members of the corporation. There were only 1700 volumes in the library at this time but as the library grew so did its membership, tickets being granted to literary men as well as members.

The small library formed by the Corporation in 1824–1828 increased in size and importance. The core collection still focused upon London history and books which illustrated London's growth and development; but it also covered topographical studies and more general library volumes such as dictionaries and glossaries.

The library eventually outgrew its accommodation, and a new building was planned to the East of Guildhall and into Basinghall Street. The Corporation and Common Council decided that from now on access to its books and library treasures should be made available to the public free of charge.

The new library building was designed by Horace Jones (the City architect); it was built between 1868 and 1872 and opened to the general public in 1873. A substantial stone structure, it adopted the Perpendicular Gothic in style in order to complement the neighbouring Guildhall building. By then the library contained about 60,000 volumes of works covering the history of London, its architecture, topography, its suburbs and a large collection of early printed plays connected with the city. The Library still has a collection of plays from the 19th century, acquired through the Chapman bequest. It is this building which is now called "The Old Library", and the office of the Guildhall Librarian is now the Chief Commoner's parlour.

Some older printed items have classifications like "Bay A" and "Bay H": this indicates the bay and shelf on which the books were kept in the old library building.

Until the Public Libraries Act 1892 (55 & 56 Vict. c. 53), which allowed local authorities to set up public libraries, the only other municipal reference library of any size was Westminster Reference Library. In the years following the act, Guildhall became unusual in being a "reference only" library and began to extend its collections.

=== Twentieth century ===
In 1926 the London Classification system was devised for Guildhall Library, and it remains in use for the London Collection. The same classifications are used at Barbican Library, for their London Collection, which is for loan.

Around 25,000 volumes were lost in the Second World War, on 29–30 December 1940, through the destruction of some of the Library's store rooms; but the damage to the library building itself was not extensive. After the war the library acquired extra stack space in the Guildhall crypt.

As part of the post-war Guildhall reconstruction scheme, the architects Sir Giles Scott, Son and Partners were asked to design a new library. The present Guildhall Library, in the West Wing of Guildhall, opened on 21 October 1974. It took 7 weeks to wheel many trolley loads of books to a new home (legally on this occasion). It was a very modern library for its time; a Country Life article suggested that with its card indexes and easily accessible shelves it could well be the most efficient machine for the retrieval of information in the world – but they had to keep the old pneumatic tube system in as nothing could beat it!

In 2009–2010 the Prints and Maps and Manuscripts sections moved to London Metropolitan Archives, although some major manuscript collections are still housed at Guildhall. Until 2023, Guildhall Library shared a building with the City Business Library, so users could move very readily between current and historical business resources. (The City Business Library, once called the Commercial Reference Room, had returned to its original home: first housed at Guildhall Library, it moved to Basinghall Street in 1970 and later to Brewers' Hall Garden. The City Business Library, now the Small Business Research + Enterprise Centre, moved back to Basinghall Street in February 2023.)

== Services ==
The current Guildhall Library is a major public reference library, holding a wide range of important works and sources including: a comprehensive collection of printed books on the City of London and its history, the Lloyds Marine Collection, a large collection of pamphlets from the 17th–19th centuries covering political and social issues, a complete run of the London Gazette from 1665 to the present, extensive parliamentary resources including 18th-century poll books and a complete set of House of Commons papers from 1740, broadsides and an unrivalled collection of local and trade directories from 1677 to the present. Other significant collections include English local history, family history, business history, food and wine, historic books on gardening, archery, 17th and 18th century music, early travel and exploration, Sir Thomas More, Charles Lamb, John Wilkes, Samuel Pepys, clock making and clock makers. In addition, five archive collections are held at Guildhall Library: those of the livery companies, the Stock Exchange, Christ's Hospital, St Paul's Cathedral and material associated with the Lloyd's Marine Collection.

== Holdings ==
Books

There are specialist book collections on the following subjects:

- London and its history
- Local history
- Family history
- English law
- Parliamentary material
- Wine and food
- Clocks and clockmakers (incorporating also the libraries of the Worshipful Company of Clockmakers and of the Antiquarian Horological Society)
- Business history
- Marine history
- Several smaller collections

The local history collections are not restricted to London but cover the whole of the British Isles. In addition to complete sets of the Victoria County History of England volumes and the Pevsner Architectural Guides, the library holds a collection of county, town and village histories, and also holds journals and other publications of many local history and archaeological societies. The combination of the libraries of the Antiquarian Horological Society, the Clockmakers' Company and the Corporation's own holdings means the Guildhall offers a horological reference collection of international standing.
