= David Dinsmore =

British civil servant (born 1968)

- Born: David Dinsmore; 2 September 1968 (age 57); Glasgow, Scotland
- Occupation: Senior civil servant
- Employer: Government of the United Kingdom
- Title: Permanent Secretary for Communications

Permanent Secretary for Communications
- Incumbent
- Assumed office 30 July 2025
- Preceded by: Office created

David Dinsmore (born 2 September 1968) is a senior civil servant and former editor of The Sun newspaper.

== Early career ==
Dinsmore grew up in Glasgow, and began working for News International at the age of 22.

He was employed by the Clydebank Post and then later he worked as a reporter for the Eastwood Mercury, Milngavie Herald and Kirkintilloch Herald newspapers.

In 1991, Dinsmore became a casual reporter for the Scottish Sun newspaper. At the same time he began a degree in business management at Paisley University. His first full-time role as a reporter came with the Daily Star in their Edinburgh office.

== Career with News Corp ==
Dinsmore returned to the Scottish Sun as a reporter in 1994, he then rose through the ranks of that paper to become sub-editor, then chief sub-editor. and made the move to London after becoming picture editor of the News of the World under Phil Hall.

In 2004, Dinsmore became night editor of The Sun, and in 2006, he was appointed editor of the Scottish edition of the paper, serving until 2010. He then became general manager of the paper in Scotland, then in quick succession managing editor in London, and director of operations for News International. Dinsmore was appointed editor of The Sun in June 2013, replacing Dominic Mohan.

Following his appointment to the job, he faced criticism as a result of the growing support for the No More Page 3 campaign, which challenged the appropriateness of bare breasts in the family newspaper. In November 2013, he stated that he had no intention of dropping the Page 3 feature, despite the pressure from campaign supporters including politicians, celebrities and student bodies. In December 2014, Dinsmore was named sexist of the year by End Violence Against Women. The Page 3 feature of a topless women came to end in January 2015.

Under his editorship The Sun's online presence went behind a paywall, however Dinsmore is credited with growing the online subscriber base, doubling the number of paying customers from an initial 117,000 to 225,000. Dinsmore has won also plaudits from the media industry, ranking at 27 in the 2014 Media Guardian 100, and at 67 in GQ magazine's 2015 'Most Connected Men in Britain' list. On 2 September 2015, he was promoted to Chief Operating Officer of News UK, and Tony Gallagher succeeded him as editor of The Sun.

In 2016 he was convicted of breaking the Sexual Offences (Amendment) act after inadvertently revealing the identity of a victim of a sexual offence.

== Career in civil service ==
In late July 2025, Dinsmore was appointed "permanent secretary for communications" for the UK government. His appointment, and that of Peter Mandelson as British ambassador to the United States, was criticised by the former prime minister Gordon Brown.

== See also ==
- The Sun newspaper

Media offices
Preceded by Dominic Mohan	Editor of The Sun; 2013–2015	Succeeded by Tony Gallagher
