= Stop Bild Sexism =

German campaign to stop women objectification in Bild

- Founded: 8 October 2014
- Founder: Kristina Lunz
- Location: Bamberg, Germany
- Website: www.stopbildsexism.com

Stop Bild Sexism (German: Schluss mit dem Bild-Sexismus) is a campaign opposing what its organizers describe as the objectification of women in Bild-Zeitung, the most popular newspaper in Germany. The paper has been criticized by numerous sources over the years for its sexist representations of women. The campaign's first aim is to persuade the newspaper to stop publishing photographs of the "Bild-Girl," a topless model. It also asks that the newspaper start reporting on women and women's issues in the same way that it writes about men.

Stop Bild Sexism was inspired by the No More Page 3 campaign in the UK to persuade The Sun newspaper to abandon its practice of publishing images of half-naked women.

== History ==
The campaign began in October 2014 with a petition posted on Change.org by Kristina Lunz, a postgraduate student at the University of Oxford, asking the Bild's editor, Kai Diekmann, to remove the topless "Bild-Girl" from the publication. The petition was discussed on Twitter under the hashtag #BILDsexism.

The newspaper stopped publishing topless images on its front page in 2012, but they are still published inside the newspaper and on its website. On 17 September 2014 it published photographs of the cleavages of six well-known German women on its front page, and asked readers to rate them. Sophia Becker, the campaign's social-media manager, cited this as an example of the newspaper's pattern of objectifying women and normalizing sexism.

Lunz has described Bild's reporting of sexual assault and harassment as "sexist and voyeuristic." She asserts that the tone of outrage found in the publication's frequent reporting of cases of sexual harassment and sexual violence appears to indicate that the anger over violence against women is only superficial, because it is juxtaposed with the publication's frequent use of images of unclothed women. Lunz and Becker said they were inspired by the No More Page 3 campaign, led by Lucy-Anne Holmes, which asked the editor of The Sun newspaper in the UK to voluntarily remove their similarly topless Page 3 models.

== Reception ==
As of July 2019, the petition had over 58,000 signatures and has been recognized by Diekmann. Campaign supporters include the Deutscher Frauenrat (German Women's Council); Selmin Çalışkan, Secretary General of Amnesty International in Germany; Angela Kolb, justice minister for Saxony-Anhalt; and members of the Bundestag (German Parliament) Ekin Deligöz, Katja Dörner, Elke Ferner, Britta Haßelmann, Katja Kipping, Sylvia Kotting-Uhl, Renate Künast, Birgit Kömpel, Katja Mast, Cornelia Möhring, Ulli Nissen, Sönke Rix, Ulle Schauws and Dorothee Schlegel.

It is also supported by Maria Noichl and Terry Reintke, members of the European Parliament; Anke Domscheit-Berg, formerly of the Piratenpartei Deutschland, and several celebrities, including singer Jasmin Tabatabai.

Axel Springer SE, the publisher of Bild, has responded to the campaign by issuing a statement of values. These include the importance of mutual respect and maintaining respectful interactions.
