= Geoff Webster =

British newspaper editor

- Born: Geoffrey B. Webster; 1959
- Occupation: Newspaper editor
- Employer(s): The Sun newspaper News Corp UK
- Known for: Arrested and charged as part of Operation Elveden
- Criminal charge: Conspiring to commit misconduct in a public office (section 1(1) of the Criminal Law Act 1977).
- Spouse: Alison Webster

Geoff Webster (born Geoffrey B. Webster; 1959) is the deputy editor of The Sun newspaper in the UK (currently suspended due to criminal charges brought under Operation Elveden).

== The Sun ==
In 2003 the deputy editor of the News of the World, Rebekah Brooks, was appointed editor of the Sun newspaper. Shortly after arriving Brooks moved Webster from his job as associate editor/head of pictures at the News of the World, appointing him associate editor at the Sun, effectively making him "third in command" on the paper.

Webster was promoted to joint deputy editor of the Sun, along with Simon Cosyns, when David Dinsmore replaced Brooks as editor in 2009.

== Criminal charges ==
Webster was arrested and charged with conspiring to commit misconduct in a public office as part of Operation Elveden. One of the charges relates to an alleged payment of £6,500 to a Ministry of Defence official, with a further £1,500 allegedly going to another public official.

Webster's arrest in February 2012 prompted Rupert Murdoch to fly to London to reassure the staff that he would not be closing down the newspaper. Writing in The Guardian, Roy Greenslade described Murdoch's meeting with the staff:

"Though some reports suggested soon after the 6 March meeting that he [Rupert Murdoch] had won over the assembled staff, I was told the opposite. ... They were not in the least bit mollified by what he had to say. ... It was a hugely emotional occasion. Former managing editor Graham Dudman – the major spokesman on behalf of his colleagues – eventually broke down in tears. This followed the reading – by agony aunt Deidre Sanders – of a letter written by Alison Webster, the Page 3 photographer who is married to deputy editor Geoff Webster (who attended the meeting)."

Webster was supported by several colleagues, and his wife, when he appeared in court. He pleaded not guilty at the Old Bailey and was given unconditional bail. On 20 March 2015, Webster was cleared of charges that he had signed off illegal payments.

== See also ==
- The Sun newspaper
- Operation Elveden
- Section 1(1) of the Criminal Law Act 1977, conspiring to commit misconduct in public office.

Media offices
Preceded by Dominic Mohan	Joint Deputy Editor of The Sun; 2009–now(with Simon Coysns)	Succeeded by {{{after}}}
