= Marion Horn =

German journalist (born 1965)

Marion Horn (born 28 December 1965 in Kiel) is a German journalist, former editor of Bild am Sonntag (2013–2019) and as of 2023 Chairperson of the Editorial Board of the German tabloid Bild. In the meantime, she was a partner at the consulting firm Kekst CNC.

== Career ==
Marion Horn began a traineeship at the age of 19 with the W&W publishing house in Hamburg and the "St. Pauli News." In 1992, Horn became the editor-in-chief of Bauer Media Group's erotic magazine Das neue Wochenend. In 1998, she moved to TV Hören und Sehen as editor-in-chief and then to the Hamburger Morgenpost, where she succeeded Mathias Döpfner.

In 2001, she joined Bild, and in 2013, she became the first female editor of Bild am Sonntag. Horn left Axel Springer SE at the end of 2019, citing the planned merger of the editorial teams of Bild and Bild am Sonntag as the reason for her departure. Starting in 2020, she spent a year as a partner at the communications consultancy Kekst CNC, which is part of the Publicis Groupe.

She returned to Bild in 2023 as Chairperson of the Bild Group's Editorial Board as part of a restructuring at Axel Springer.

== Personal life ==
Horn became a single mother of a daughter in 1987. In 2009, her second child was born.
