= Gail McKenna =

British model and television presenter

- Born: 30 December 1968 (age 57); Liverpool, Lancashire, England
- Occupations: Glamour model; actress; presenter
- Years active: 1986–present
- Height: 5 ft 5 in (1.65 m)
- Spouses: Tony Potter (m. 1990; div. 1992); James Rhodes (m. 1997)
- Children: 2

Gail McKenna (born 30 December 1968) is an English former glamour model, former theatre and television actress, and former television presenter. She worked as a Page 3 girl and glamour model from 1986 until 1990, before becoming a sports presenter for L!VE TV and Five and a presenter of children's programmes for CITV.

== Glamour modelling ==
McKenna was born on 30 December 1968 in Liverpool, Lancashire. As a teenager, she attended a Catholic convent school in Liverpool. After attaining eight O-levels, she took a year off, intending to return to pursue A-levels in classics and history. However, after achieving success as a glamour model, she decided not to return to school.

On 21 May 1986, aged 17, McKenna made her Page 3 debut in the tabloid newspaper The Sun. She went on to become one of the most popular glamour models of her era, with her photographs appearing regularly in tabloid newspapers and men's magazines. In 1988, she appeared in a Playboy magazine pictorial with a number of other Page 3 models, including Maria Whittaker and Suzanne Mizzi.

McKenna ceased topless and nude modelling in 1990, at the age of 21, after she became a born again Christian.

== Theatre, film and television ==
In the late 1980s and early 1990s, McKenna regularly played parts in pantomimes and fringe theatre productions. Her film and television credits include a minor uncredited role in the black comedy film Consuming Passions, (1988) as well as a brief role in Channel 4's soap opera Brookside, where she played the girlfriend of character Barry Grant.

In 1996, McKenna became a television sports presenter for L!VE TV's Sports Live. She went on to present the sports shows Turnstile and Live and Dangerous on the TV channel Five.

In 1998, she became a children's television presenter for CITV. She worked on Brilliant Creatures from 1998–2004, where her co-hosts included Terry Nutkins and Stephen Mulhern, and How 2 from 2000–06, which she co-presented with Fred Dinenage and Gareth Jones.

== Personal life ==
In 1990, McKenna married stuntman Tony Potter, whom she had met on the set of a pantomime production two years earlier. The couple had a son in 1992, but they divorced later that year. She married her second husband, restaurateur James Rhodes, on 25 January 1997 at Dalhousie Castle, Midlothian in Scotland. In December 1997, she gave birth to a second son.
