= Felicity Buirski =

- Also known as: Felicity Buirsky
- Born: Orpington, Greater London, England
- Genres: Disco; folk; pop
- Occupations: Journalist; model; actress; musician; psychotherapist
- Instruments: Guitar; vocals
- Labels: Run River; Poker; Devil; Joker; Philips; Tamarin; Rhiannon
- Formerly of: Page Three
- Website: felicitybuirski.com

Felicity Buirski is a former English journalist, model and actress. In later years she found recognition as a folk singer and composer. She has also worked and performed with folk musician and former Steeleye Span member, Peter Knight.

== Background ==
Felicity Buirski was born in Orpington. She is the daughter of a musician. She worked as a journalist in her teens but left that career when she entered into the world of modelling. In addition to being a journalist, model, actress and musician, Buirski has also been a psychotherapist.

In 1989, the Lincolnshire Standard and Boston Guardian referred to her as "one of the ‘most gripping performers to grace modern music". She had an association with Leonard Cohen, and Jim Devlin, the author of In every style of passion : the works of Leonard Cohen wrote, "If she were ever to turn her attention to covering some of Leonard’s songs (perhaps ‘Nancy’ and ‘If It Be Your Will’), she could easily look Judy Collins and Jennifer Warnes in the eye and have nothing to fear".

== Early career ==
=== Page Three ===
In 1976, Felicity Buirski was the lead singer in the vocal group Page Three, which was made up of three Page 3 models from The Sun, herself, Clare Russell and Stefani Marrian. They were signed up to Warner Bros., and worked with arranger Brian Bennett and producer Bruce Welch, recording the single "Hold on to Love", which was released in July 1977. The song was a hit, and was in the Record Mirror Star Breaker list for the week of 13 August 1977, and the 20th. For the week of 27 August, it was at the top of the Star Breakers list, and it stayed there for another week.

== Solo music career ==
=== 1970s ===
Felicity Buirski recorded the song "Poor Painted Lady". Backed with the old Foundations and Herman's Hermits song, "I Can Take or Leave Your Lovin'", it was credited to her first name, Felicity and released on Poker POS 15071 in 1978.

According to the 22 December 1978 issue of TV Times, Buirski was making her television debut on the Benny Hill Show.

=== 1980s ===
Buirski released the single "Angel" on the Philips label. It was reviewed by John Shearlaw in the 15 March 1980 issue of Record Mirror. It was not complementary with Shearlaw referring to her as a "breathy Lorraine Chase clone" and saying that it took too long to get to the point. The song played on Italy's IV Canale on 16 December 1982.

==== Repairs & Alterations ====
Felicity Buirski's critically acclaimed debut album Repairs & Alterations came about as a result of her songs she recorded as demos in 1985 being heard by Fred Underhill, a British-based American. After listening to the recordings, he offered to release an album for her. She took him up on his offer. It was released in the United Kingdom on the Run River Records label in 1987. There were also negotiations for distribution in the United States. According to John Tobler in the 30 January 1988 issue of Music Week, Repairs & Alterations was one of the first five albums released by the budding Run River Records label that was to attract the most attention. There were comparisons made to Carly Simon. One song, "The Executioner's Song" was singled out for mention, with Tobler saying that it deserved investigation by those who enjoyed Suzanne Vega and it had a passion that Vega sometimes seemed to lack. The album's release in the US on RRA 004 was noted in the 21 April 1989 issue of the CMJ New Music Report. The album had some airplay in the US, at Radio WEMU. The album was a CD Hi-Fi Music Awards winner for 1989 in the Best Folk Album category.

=== 1990s ===
Buirski performed at McCabe's in January 1990. Her performance was reviewed by Steve Hochman of The Los Angeles Times. He described her performance as intense and said, " the experience was part empathy, part catharsis and part emotional voyeurism". He compared it to her mentor Leonard Cohen.

Booked for a solo performance at the Spilsby Theatre, Buirski was appearing there on 14 March 1992.

In 1999, Buirski's Interior Design album was released on the Rhiannon Records label.

=== 2000s - 2020s ===
On 30 March 2001, Buirski and former Steeleye Span band member Peter Knight were booked to appear at Ruskin Mill. A review of a performance by the duo was published on 27 April 2001. Buirski was in the second slot of the show, performing original material. She was accompanied by Peter Knight on violin and keyboards. According to reviewer Ian Munro, the audience was affected in three ways with some who he referred to as devotees appreciating the whole evening. The other two were those who were open minded but not sure what to make of the performance and those did not connect for various reasons. Munro did say that she had a voice many would kill for, but he also said, "the material may have been too self-indulgent for the folk club audience and "it had stimulated more discussion than any act booked during the past weeks".

Working with just her producer Michael Klein and Ian Stewart, Buirski recorded her Committed to Fire album which was released in 2019. It featured herself on acoustic guitar and vocals, Michael S. Klein on additional guitars, bass and percussion, and Ian Stewart on keyboards. It was reviewed that year by Mike Davies of Folking. He called it "a magnificent and quietly inspirational album".
