= Debee Ashby =

English adult model (born 1967)

- Born: Deborah Jane Ashby; 2 July 1967 (age 59); Meriden, Warwickshire, England
- Occupation: Glamour model
- Height: 5 ft 5 in (1.65 m)

Deborah Jane Ashby (born 2 July 1967) is an English former glamour model who appeared in British men's magazines and tabloid newspapers during the 1980s and 1990s. She was one of the best-known Page 3 models of her era.

== Career ==
Ashby was born in Meriden, Warwickshire. Her modelling career began when her mother, Anne Ashby, took her at age 16 to a glamour photography studio in Coventry. In Ashby's early days as a model, Anne Ashby suggested that mother and daughter pose topless together "so that Dad could have the photo," a request Ashby later acknowledged made her feel "odd." In late 1983, she began appearing on Page 3 of The Sun and in British men's magazines. As a consequence, she was expelled from King Henry VIII School, Coventry, an independent grammar school, before she completed her O-levels. She went on to model for numerous other publications and also starred in a number of softcore videos. She retired from glamour modelling in 1996.

Ashby subsequently expressed regret over her glamour modelling career. She noted that she suffered from bulimia for around seven years, that men frequently preyed sexually on young glamour models, and that she underwent therapy for four years. She supported the decision to remove Page 3 from The Sun, stating that if she had a daughter, she would not want her to become a glamour model.

In 2018, aged 50, Ashby featured in a charity glamour pictorial in The Sun, appearing alongside other former Page 3 models to raise funds for a fellow former model's cancer treatment. She and the other models were photographed covering their breasts with their hands.

In her 50s, Ashby began posting topless images of herself for subscribers on OnlyFans and Fanvue.

== Personal life ==
Ashby had a relationship with American actor Tony Curtis when she was 17 and he was 59, during which she spent time at his Palm Springs home. The relationship was controversial and widely publicised due to the age difference and, in an interview, she downplayed any sexual aspect, saying that "He wanted company. It wasn't just my boobs... He said I had an interesting personality." She was also linked romantically to Status Quo guitarist Rick Parfitt and gangster Reggie Kray.

Ashby married session musician Richard Mead in 1992, but the marriage ended two years later. After retiring from glamour modelling, she moved to the Isle of Man in 1996, where she married Dave Wookey in 1999. The couple had a baby boy in 2000, but they subsequently divorced. Ashby subsequently lived with partner Johnny Mills.
