= Suzanne Mizzi =

British painter (1967–2011)

- Born: 1 December 1967; State of Malta
- Died: 22 May 2011 (aged 43); Hackney, London, England
- Occupations: Glamour model; singer; interior designer; artist
- Height: 5 ft 4 in (1.63 m)
- Spouse(s): Frank Camilleri (1985–2011, her death); 2 children

Suzanne Mizzi (1 December 1967 – 22 May 2011) was a Maltese-born glamour model, singer, interior designer, and artist. She made regular appearances as a Page 3 girl in the British newspaper The Sun during the 1980s and 1990s, before going on to have a career as a catwalk model, as well as being involved in film and music. In her later years, she developed a career as an interior designer and abstract artist.

== Career ==
Mizzi was born in Malta and grew up in London.

After leaving school at 15, Mizzi opened a clothes shop in Bethnal Green, London, where she was discovered by a photographer while working. She made her Page 3 debut in 1984 aged 17 and immediately endeared herself to the public, although it took her parents a while to become comfortable with her career choice. In the first six months of her modelling career, Mizzi shot 26 calendars and was in high demand for personal appearances. Her success was helped by Page 3 photographer Beverley Goodway, whose pictures helped to establish her career. She could command fees of over £1,000 for a personal appearance.

In 1986 Mizzi appeared in a music video for the song "Anything She Does" by Genesis alongside comedian Benny Hill and fellow glamour model Maria Whittaker.

In 1988, she quit glamour modelling and began catwalk modelling. She signed with the Storm Model Agency and began doing fashion shoots, something which would eventually lead to her working with Vivienne Westwood. At the age of 21, she signed a £400,000 contract to front her own lingerie range for high street chain Dorothy Perkins. A lingerie company once insured her face and body for £11 million.

Mizzi had an interest in music and was a founding member of the group Wildflowers, but her attempts to launch a musical career faltered, something she blamed on her record company: "We had a record deal, but the label wanted me to sing a pop track. I wanted to be an 'artist', not a pop star." According to a BBC report, she was one of a number of celebrities who took out insurance on the assets for which they were famous. She did this in 1989, when she insured her body with Lloyd's of London for $16 million.

In the 2000s she became an artist and interior designer and was known as Mizzy. She exhibited her work at London's Rainbird Fine Art Gallery and ran an interior and building design consultancy business, which she started after friends saw work she had done on her house and asked her to design rooms for them. She began painting after having difficulty sourcing works of art for her clients. Her abstract paintings sold for up to £10,000 each. An exhibition of her work titled "Timeless" was held at the Artbank Gallery, also in London.

== Personal life ==
Mizzi was married to her childhood sweetheart Frank Camilleri, a property developer, with whom she had a son and a daughter. Camilleri, who was her manager, is a Maltese Briton. The family divided their time between homes in London, Spain and Malta.

She was diagnosed with ovarian cancer in 2010; she died at St Joseph's Hospice, Hackney, East London, on 22 May 2011, aged 43.
