= Peter Boenisch =

German journalist and author (1927–2005)

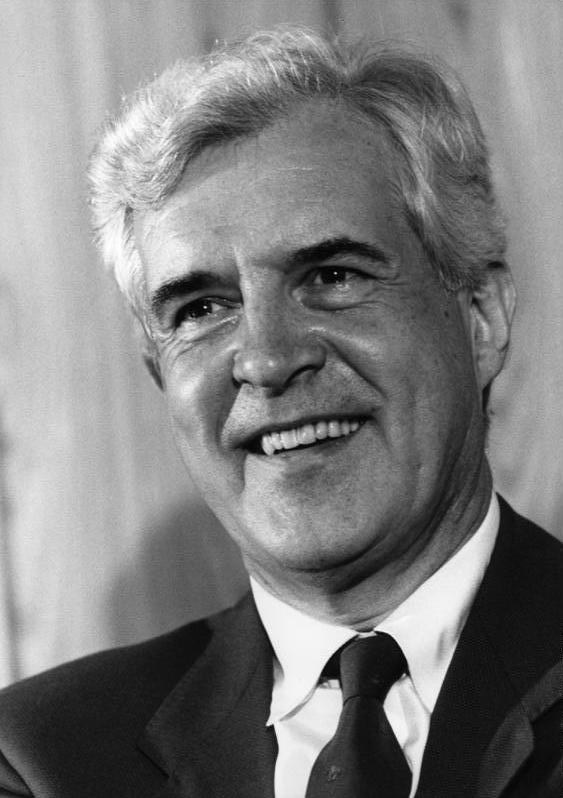
Boenisch in 1983

Peter Boenisch (4 May 1927 in Berlin – 8 July 2005 in Gmund am Tegernsee) was a German columnist and journalist.

== Life ==
Boenisch worked as journalist for the West German newspaper Bild, where he became in 1961 editor-in-chief. He was the founder of magazine Bravo. From 1978 to 1981 he worked for the West German newspaper Die Welt. From 19 May 1983 to 14 June 1985 Boenisch was speaker of Helmut Kohl's West German cabinet. In 2001, he became president of organisation Union-Clubs von 1867. Boenisch married three times.

== Awards ==
- Bavarian Order of Merit
- 2003: Order of Merit of the Federal Republic of Germany
