= Clydebank Post =

Local newspaper in Clydebank, Scotland

- Type: Weekly newspaper
- Owner: Newsquest
- Headquarters: 125 Fullarton Drive Glasgow Lanarkshire G32 8FG
- Circulation: 1,264 (as of 2023)
- Website: clydebankpost.co.uk

The Clydebank Post is a weekly newspaper based in the town of Clydebank; near Glasgow in Scotland.

The newspaper is the flagship title of Clyde Weekly Press, part of Newsquest Media Group. It has the largest readership of any weekly newspaper dedicated to serving the West Dunbartonshire area, with an ABC adult readership for the period between 33,550 for July 2007 to December 2007.

The Clydebank Post superseded the Clydebank Press. Archives of the paper, under both titles, are available to view in Clydebank Library.

Other newspapers within the Clyde Weekly Press group are Dumbarton & Vale of Leven Reporter, Helensburgh Advertiser, Barrhead News, Paisley & Renfrewshire Gazette, and the weekly tabloid freesheet for the Renfrewshire area, The Paisley People.

In April 2015, the paper was relaunched as an attempt to slow the decline of print sales, which are now at around 5,000 per week. Despite a decline in print sales - reflected nationally in print publications - the website traffic is steadily increasing, with records reflecting an average of 100,000 to 150,000 users per month.

In 2015, Romanes Media Group was taken over by Newsquest Media Group, which resulted in a re-structure of staffing in CWP titles.

The editorial team at the Clydebank Post includes Gillian Murphy (group content editor), Tristan Stewart-Robertson (chief reporter) and Jack Thomson (reporter). Henry Ainslie, deputy editor of the Evening Times, retains overall responsibility for all CWP titles.

The newspaper office is based at 201 Dumbarton Road, Clydebank.
