= Alison Webster (photographer) =

British photographer

- Born: Alison Valda Webster
- Occupation: Photographer
- Employer(s): The Sun newspaper News Corp UK
- Predecessor: Alan Strutt
- Spouse: Geoff Webster
- Children: 2
- Website: alisonwebster.co.uk

Alison Valda Webster is a British photographer that previously worked as the official Page 3 photographer for The Sun newspaper. She has worked in the British national newspaper industry for 30 years. Following the retirement of longtime principal Page 3 photographer Beverley Goodway in 2003, Webster took over the role in 2005. Her work on Page 3 came to an end when The Sun discontinued the Page 3 print edition in January 2015 and closed down the Page3.com website in 2017.

The No More Page 3 campaign launched in 2012 with the goal of ending the tradition of publishing topless models in The Sun. When asked about the campaign, Webster said that, "people should be able to make their own choices." She also commented: "The photographs have stayed the same for 40 years. They've not got any more explicit. It staggers me that some, particularly young people, still have an issue with them. ... The argument is the wrong way round. If you have a problem with your body, if, as a child, you grew up with certain body issues, then I can see how Page Three could affect you. But if you are comfortable with yourself then it will have no effect on you at all."

== See also ==
- Glamour photography
