= No More Page 3 =

British campaign to stop publication of Page 3

- Founded: 22 August 2012
- Founder: Lucy-Anne Holmes
- Location: Brighton, England

No More Page 3 was a successful campaign which ran in the United Kingdom from 2012 to 2015, aimed at convincing the owners and editors of The Sun to cease publishing images of topless glamour models on Page 3, which it had done since 1970. Started by writer Lucy-Anne Holmes in August 2012, the campaign represented Page 3 as an outdated, sexist tradition that demeaned girls and women. The campaign collected over 240,000 signatures on an online petition and gained support from over 140 MPs, a number of trade unions, over 30 universities, and many charities and advocacy groups.

The Sun ceased publishing topless Page 3 images in its Republic of Ireland edition in 2013, in its UK editions in 2015, and on its Page3.com website in 2017. The Daily Star also ceased publishing images of topless glamour models in 2019.

== History ==
Since November 1970, The Sun tabloid newspaper had published images of topless glamour models on its third page. Although many feminists had criticized the feature, the tabloid had always vigorously defended Page 3. In 1986, after Labour MP Clare Short tried to introduce legislation banning topless images from national newspapers, The Sun ran a "Stop Crazy Clare" campaign to discredit her. Under the editorship of Rebekah Brooks, The Sun renewed its attacks on Short in 2004, calling her a "killjoy" and "fat and jealous" after the MP reiterated her criticisms of Page 3.

Lucy-Anne Holmes, who stated that Page 3 had affected her body image when she was 11 years old, began campaigning against the feature when she noticed during the London Olympics that the most prominent woman in The Sun was its Page 3 model, despite the achievements of Britain's female athletes. She launched an online petition in August 2012, which asked Sun editor Dominic Mohan to remove topless models from Page 3, on the basis that they demeaned women, perpetuated sexism, and damaged girls' and women's body image. The petition eventually gathered over 240,000 signatures. The campaign gained significant support from politicians, trade unions, universities, and advocacy groups. It sponsored two women's soccer teams, Nottingham Forest Women F.C. and Cheltenham Town L.F.C., whose players wore the "No More Page 3" logo on their shirts. It also tried to persuade Lego to stop running promotions in The Sun. Lego confirmed in March 2013 that its tie-in with the newspaper would end, but denied that the move was due to the campaign.

In April 2013, No More Page 3 activist Lisa Clarke authored a Huffington Post article that highlighted misogynistic and degrading remarks about topless models contained in the comments section of the Daily Star's website. After her article, the newspaper deleted and permanently disabled comments regarding its models.

In August 2013, Paul Clarkson, editor of The Sun's Republic of Ireland edition, replaced topless models with images of women in swimwear. The No More Page 3 campaign thanked Clarkson "for taking the lead in the dismantling of a sexist institution" and called on The Sun to make the same change in the UK. However, newly appointed Sun editor David Dinsmore stated that British editions would continue to carry Page 3, pointing to survey data showing that two-thirds of the tabloid's readers wished to retain the feature.

A joint campaign by No More Page 3 and Child Eyes called on supermarkets to redesign their newspaper displays to prevent children from seeing sexual content on front pages, which the Bailey Review had also recommended in 2011. In 2014, Tesco and Waitrose announced that they would implement these recommendations.

For her work on the No More Page 3 campaign, the BBC included Lucy-Anne Holmes on its 100 Women list for 2014.

In January 2015, The Sun replaced topless Page 3 images with clothed glamour photographs across all its editions. A spokeswoman for No More Page 3 called the decision "truly historic news" and "a huge step for challenging media sexism”. Penguin Books published Holmes's book about the campaign, How to Start a Revolution, two months later. In 2016, the No More Page 3 campaign redirected its efforts into a short-lived project called Sexist News, aimed at highlighting misogynistic media coverage in The Daily Express, The Daily Mail, The Daily Mirror and The Sun.

The Daily Star ceased its topless glamour feature in April 2019, becoming the last mainstream daily tabloid to do so.

== Supporters ==
The campaign received support from Green MP Caroline Lucas along with cross-party support from over 140 other MPs. Thirty universities supported the campaign by voting to boycott The Sun until topless images were dropped from Page 3. The campaign also had the support of many groups and organizations including the National Assembly for Wales, Girlguiding UK, National Union of Teachers, National Association of Head Teachers, the Association of Teachers and Lecturers, UNISON, the British Youth Council, The Girls' Brigade, Rape Crisis, Women's Aid, End Violence Against Women Coalition, The Everyday Sexism Project, White Ribbon Campaign, The Women's International League for Peace and Freedom, UK Feminista, and Population Matters.

== Criticism ==
The feminist columnist Rowan Pelling said in April 2013 she was less concerned with the depiction of women on Page 3 than she was with that in lad mags and on the Internet. The then main photographer for Page 3, Alison Webster, also criticised the campaign, saying "people should be able to make their own choices" and "If you have a problem with your body, if as a child you grew up with certain body issues, then I can see how Page Three could affect you. But if you are comfortable with yourself then it will have no effect on you at all".

When asked whether he would be supporting the campaign, Prime Minister David Cameron replied, "I think on this one I think it is probably better to leave it to the consumer."

== See also ==
- Lad culture
- Stop Bild Sexism
- Me Too movement
