= Lucy-Anne Holmes =

British author, actor and campaigner

Lucy-Anne Holmes is a British author, actress and campaigner. She is best known for founding the No More Page 3 campaign in 2012 to convince editors to cease publishing images of topless female glamour models on the third page of tabloid newspapers, for which the BBC recognised her as one of its 100 women in 2014. She lives in Hertfordshire with her partner and son. She grew up a Catholic and is now a Quaker.

Holmes has authored several books: 50 Ways to Find a Lover (Pan, 2009); The (Im)Perfect Girlfriend (Pan, 2010); Unlike A Virgin (Sphere, 2011); Just a Girl Standing in Front of a Boy (Sphere, 2014), winner of the Romantic Novelists Association 'Rom Com of the Year 2015'; How To Start A Revolution (Transworld Digital, 2015) – described a how-to for making change happen, and the history of the No More Page 3 campaign; and Don't Hold My Head Down (Unbound, 2019) – a memoir about sex. In 2021, her Women on Top of the World: What Women Think About When They're Having Sex, written after interviewing 51 women around the world, was published.

== Actor ==
Theatre

Dates	Title	Role	Venue	Notes	Ref.
2005	The Philadelphia Story	cast member	Old Vic		
2006	Phaedra	Ismene	Donmar Warehouse	Frank McGuiness' reworking "after Racine"	
2007	All About My Mother	Isabel	Old Vic		

Television and Film

Year	Film	Role	Notes	Ref.
2005	Midsomer Murders (TV Series)	Factory Worker	Episode "Sauce for the Goose"	
2006	Midsomer Murders (TV Series) (Note: as Lucy-Anne Holmes)	Polly	Episode "Four Funerals and a Wedding"	
2007	Trial & Retribution (TV Series)	Leanne Taylor	Episode "Curriculum Vitae: Part 1"	
2012	ROFLMAO (Short)	Susan		
2013	Foyle's War (TV Series)	Evelyn Greene (younger)	Episode "The Cage"	
