= Barbican Library =

Public library in London, England

Coordinates: 51.5199°N 0.0938°W

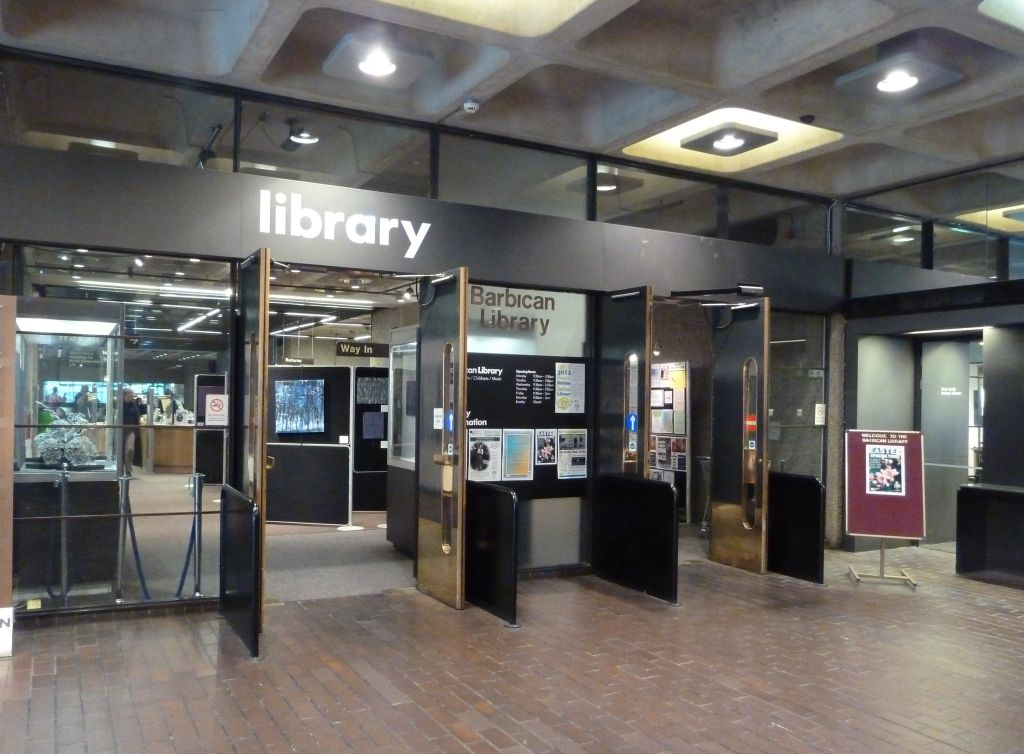
- Barbican Library, inside the Barbican Centre
- Location: City of London, Barbican Centre, Silk St, London, Greater London EC2Y 8DS

Access and use
- Population served: 8,173,194 (City of London 7,375)

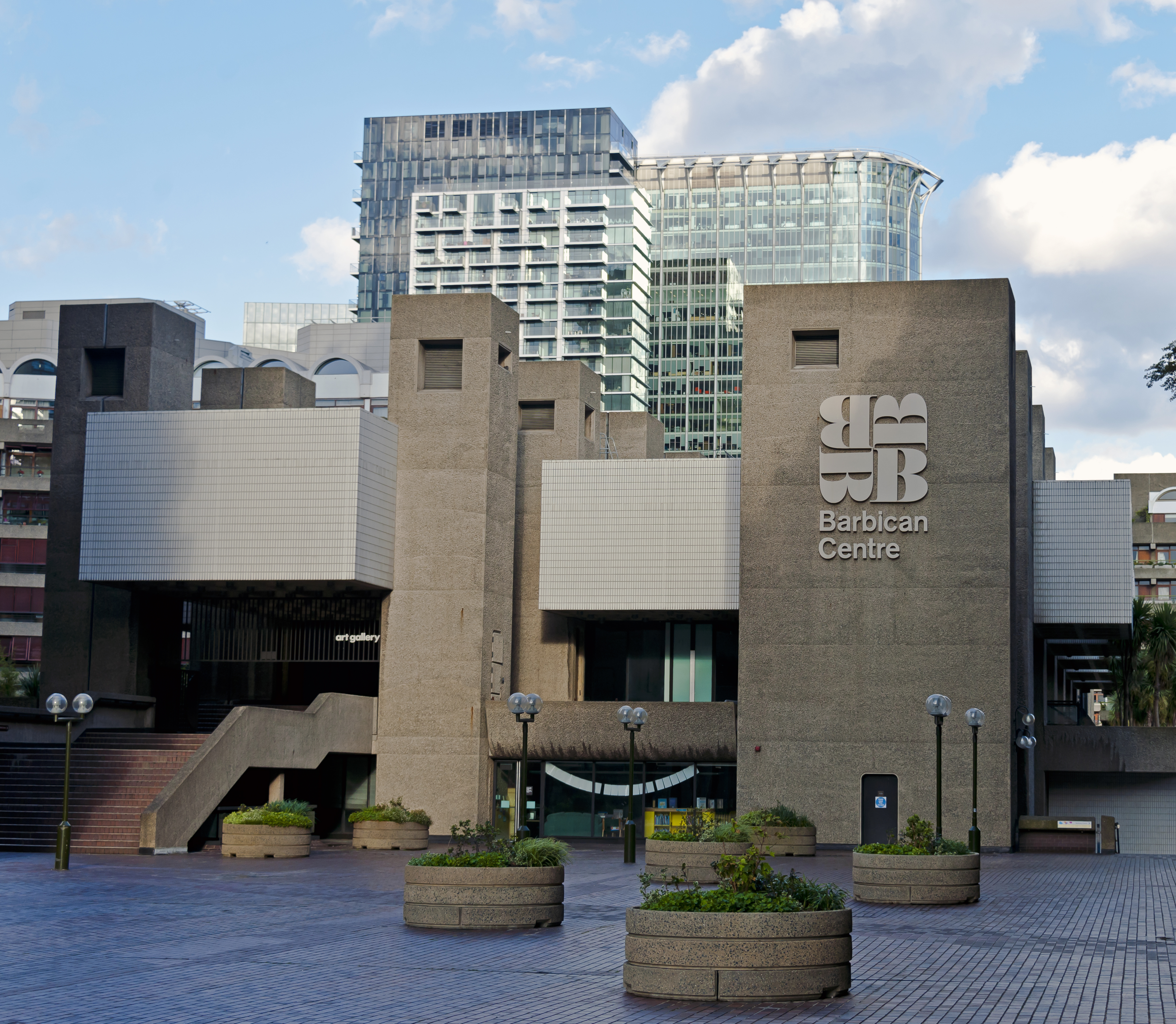
The Barbican Centre from the outside

The Barbican Library is one of the public lending libraries in the City of London. The library has a large collection of books, spoken word recordings, DVDs, CDs and music scores available, most for loan, and some reference material for use on site. This public library is one of several libraries in Central London.

== See also ==
- Guildhall Library
- London Library
- Women's Library
