= Blonde on Blonde (girl group) =

British glamour model girl group

- Origin: England
- Years active: 1970s
- Labels: Chrysalis, Pye, Music Hall, Precision, PRT, Sliced Bread Records
- Past members: Nina Carter; Jilly Johnson; Suzie-Anne Watkins; Frankie Ward

Blonde on Blonde was a girl group formed in 1978 by the British glamour models Nina Carter and Jilly Johnson. After achieving some success, particularly in Japan, they disbanded in the 1980s. Their most successful single was a cover version of Led Zeppelin's "Whole Lotta Love". They made a cameo role in the 1979 British thriller film The Golden Lady and appeared on the film's soundtrack album. Their album And How! was released in 1979.

== Discography ==
=== Singles ===
- "Subway" (1977)
- "Whole Lotta Love" (1978)

=== Albums ===
- And How! (1979)

== See also ==
- Page Three (band)
