= Kings International College =

- Camberley, Surrey; England

Information
- Website: www.kingsinternational.co.uk

Kings International College is a secondary school in Camberley, Surrey. The school is part of Bourne Education Trust.
