= Dominic Mohan =

British newspaper editor

- Born: 26 May 1969 (age 57); Bristol, England
- Occupations: Journalist, former newspaper editor, businessman/ entrepreneur and author.

Dominic Mohan (born 26 May 1969) is a British journalist, broadcaster, businessman/ entrepreneur, author and former editor of The Sun newspaper in London. He is now Founder/CEO of his own media consultancy Dominic Mohan Media, specialising in communications, public relations, crisis management and content creation.

Mohan was born in Bristol, but his family moved to Cambridgeshire when he was 10 years old. He attended the Neale-Wade Community College in March, before graduating from Southampton University in English. While studying for his degree he wrote for and then edited Wessex News (now Wessex Scene), the Southampton University student newspaper, and won a scholarship to study English and Journalism at Rutgers University in New Jersey, USA.

He joined The Sun in 1996, working on the "Bizarre" Column and editing it between 1998 and 2003. He then became Assistant Editor and columnist before being made Associate Editor (Features) in 2004. Mohan was appointed deputy editor of The Sun in 2007 by Rebekah Brooks, and was named as her replacement in 2009 following Brooks' promotion to chief executive of News International.

He launched The Sun on Sunday in February 2012, becoming The Sun's first seven-day editor. Mohan conceived the idea of re-recording Band Aid's "Do They Know It's Christmas?" in 2004, for which The Sun received the Hugh Cudlipp Award at the British Press Awards in 2005.

He has also worked for Virgin Radio as a broadcaster. For his interview with The Who's Roger Daltrey he received a Sony Radio Academy Gold Award in 2003. Mohan has since worked with the Teenage Cancer Trust, of which Daltrey is patron.

In June 2013, Mohan left The Sun to work as a consultant to Robert Thomson, chief executive of parent company News Corp. He was succeeded as Sun editor by David Dinsmore.

In September 2015, it was announced that Mohan would be working as Outside's Chief Executive Officer alongside founder and now Chairman Alan Edwards. He left The Outside Organisation in November 2018.

In 2026, HarperCollins published Mohan's 1990s memoir titled 1996: My Backstage Pass To The Wildest Year Of Britain's Wildest Decade. The City of London's Barbican Library hosted an exhibition curated by Mohan named "1996: A celebration of the wildest year of Britain’s wildest decade - 30 years on".

Mohan also hosted a 2026 series for Virgin Radio titled "Cool Britannia" during which he interviewed Spice Girl Mel B, author Irvine Welsh, England footballer Stuart Pearce, film director Richard Curtis, DJ Paul Oakenfold and members of Pulp and Ocean Colour Scene among others.

== Personal life ==
Mohan lives in north London with his wife and four children.

Media offices
Preceded by Fergus Shanahan	Deputy Editor of The Sun; 2007–2009	Succeeded by Simon Cosyns and Geoff Webster
Preceded by Rebekah Brooks	Editor of The Sun; 2009–2013	Succeeded by David Dinsmore
