= Beverley Goodway =

English photographer (1943–2012)

Beverley Goodway (13 October 1943 – 4 November 2012) was an English photographer known for his glamour shots which were published on Page 3 of The Sun newspaper in the United Kingdom.

He began his career with a news agency in 1965 after he was turned down for a place at medical school. Goodway subsequently worked for the Daily Mail and The Times. He joined The Sun in 1968, subsequently photographing models for Page Three from 1970. He retired in 2003.

== Death ==
Goodway had prostate cancer for 16 years and died of cancer, at age 69, at the Royal Brompton Hospital in London.
