= Page 3 =

British tabloid tradition of topless women on the third page

Page 3, or Page Three, was a British newspaper convention of publishing a large image of a topless female glamour model (known as a Page 3 girl) on the third page of mainstream red top tabloids. Introduced in November 1969 by The Sun, the feature boosted the paper's readership and prompted competing tabloids—including The Daily Mirror, The Sunday People and The Daily Star—to begin featuring topless models on their own third pages. Well-known Page 3 models included Linda Lusardi, Samantha Fox, Katie Price, and Keeley Hazell.

Although supporters of Page 3 defended it as a harmless British cultural tradition, the feature generated controversy throughout its history. It attracted criticism both from conservatives, who tended to view it as softcore pornography inappropriate for inclusion in national newspapers, and feminists, who argued that Page 3 objectified women's bodies, negatively affected girls' and women's body image, and perpetuated sexism. Labour Party MP Clare Short began campaigning in the mid-1980s to have Page 3 images banned from newspapers; her efforts were subsequently supported by other MPs, including Harriet Harman, Stella Creasy, Lynne Featherstone, and Caroline Lucas. Some politicians, including Nick Clegg and Ed Vaizey, expressed concern that banning the feature would compromise press freedom. The British government never enacted legislation against Page 3.

In 2012, activist Lucy-Anne Holmes launched the No More Page 3 campaign with the goal of persuading newspaper editors and owners to voluntarily end the feature. The campaign collected over 240,000 signatures on an online petition and gained support from over 140 MPs, as well as trade unions, universities, and women's groups. In February 2013, Rupert Murdoch, owner of The Sun, suggested that Page 3 could become a "halfway house", featuring glamour photographs without showing nudity. In August of that year, The Sun replaced topless Page 3 girls with clothed glamour models in its Republic of Ireland edition. In January 2015, its UK editions also moved to a clothed glamour format, after printing topless Page 3 images for over 45 years. In April 2019, The Daily Star became the last print daily to cease printing topless images, ending the convention in Britain's mainstream tabloid press. As of 2026, the only British tabloid still publishing topless models is the niche Sunday Sport.

== History ==
After Rupert Murdoch relaunched the loss-making Sun newspaper in tabloid format on 17 November 1969, editor Larry Lamb began to publish photographs of clothed glamour models on its third page to compete with The Sun's principal rival, The Daily Mirror, which was printing photos of models wearing lingerie or bikinis. The Sun's first tabloid edition showed that month's Penthouse Pet, Ulla Lindstrom, wearing a suggestively unbuttoned shirt. Page 3 photographs over the following year were often provocative, but did not feature nudity until The Sun celebrated the first anniversary of its relaunch on 17 November 1970 by printing model Stephanie Khan in her "birthday suit" (i.e. in the nude). Sitting in a field, with one of her breasts fully visible from the side, Khan was photographed by Beverley Goodway, who became The Sun's principal Page 3 photographer until he retired in 2003. Alison Webster took over Goodway's role in 2005 and remained until the feature was phased out.

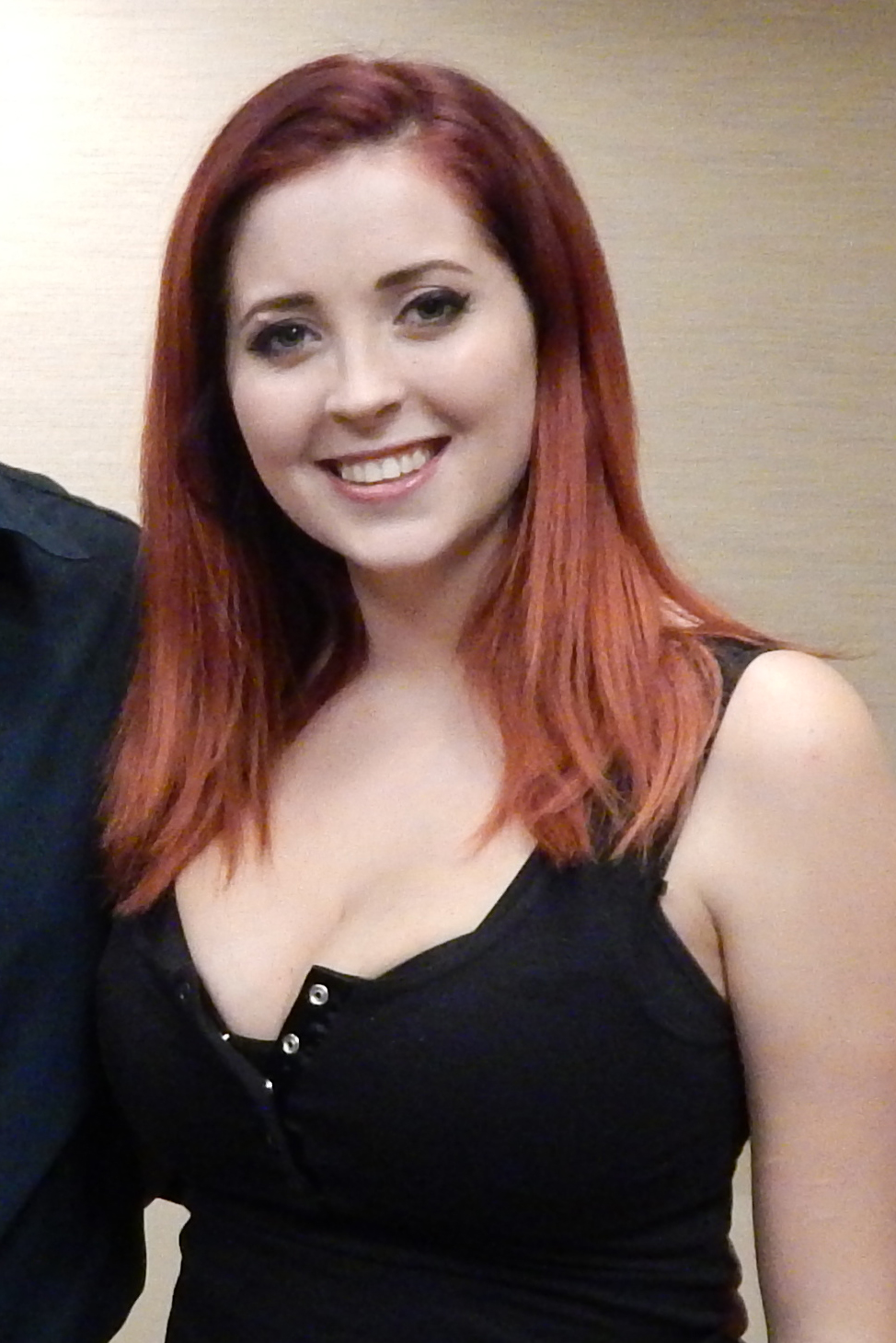
Glamour model Lucy Collett began posing for the feature in 2011 after winning The Sun's Page 3 Idol competition.

Page 3 was not a daily feature at the beginning of the 1970s, and The Sun only gradually began to feature Page 3 models in more overtly topless poses. Believing that Page 3 should feature "nice girls", Lamb sought to avoid the image of top-shelf pornography titles by asking The Sun's female reporters to review Page 3 images to ensure women would not regard them as "dirty". Regardless, the feature, and the paper's other sexual content, led to some public libraries banning The Sun. A then Conservative-controlled council in Sowerby Bridge, Yorkshire, took the first such decision, but reversed it after a series of local stunts organised by the newspaper and a change in the council's political orientation in 1971.

Page 3 is partly credited with boosting The Sun's circulation. In the year after it introduced Page 3, its daily sales doubled to over 2.5 million, and it became the UK's bestselling newspaper by 1978. Competing tabloids, including The Daily Mirror, The Sunday People, and The Daily Star, also began publishing topless models to increase their own sales, although The Daily Mirror and The Sunday People discontinued the practice in the 1980s, calling the photographs demeaning to women. In 1986, David Sullivan launched The Sunday Sport, which featured numerous images of topless models throughout each edition. In 1988, The Sun launched the companion feature "Page 7 Fella", which featured images of barechested male models. It did not gain popularity and was dropped in the 1990s.

Page 3 launched the careers of many well-known 1980s British glamour models, including Debee Ashby, Donna Ewin, Samantha Fox, Kirsten Imrie, Kathy Lloyd, Gail McKenna, Suzanne Mizzi, and Maria Whittaker, some of whom were aged 16 or 17 when they started modeling for the feature. Some Page 3 girls became well-known celebrities and went on to careers in entertainment. Fox, who began appearing on Page 3 as a 16-year-old in 1983, became one of the most-photographed British women of the 1980s, behind only Diana, Princess of Wales and Margaret Thatcher. After leaving Page 3, she launched a successful singing career.

In the mid-1990s, The Sun began printing Page 3 photographs in colour as standard, rather than mostly in black and white. Captions to Page 3 images, which had previously contained sexually suggestive double entendre, were replaced by a listing of models' first names, ages, and hometowns. It later added a "News in Briefs" item that gave the model's thoughts on current affairs. After polling readers, in 1997 The Sun ceased featuring models who had undergone breast augmentation, such as Katie Price and Melinda Messenger. In June 1999, it launched the official Page3.com website, which featured additional photos of current Page 3 models, archival images of former Page 3 models, and other related photo and video content.

Beginning in 2002, The Sun ran an annual contest called Page 3 Idol. Amateur models could submit photographs to be voted on by readers, with the winner receiving a cash prize and a Page 3 modeling contract. Notable Page 3 Idol winners included Nicola T, Keeley Hazell, and Lucy Collett.

In May 2004, the Sexual Offences Act 2003 came into effect in England and Wales, Section 45 of which raised the minimum age to appear in such publications from 16 to 18.

In 2020, Channel 4 produced an hour-long documentary, Page Three: The Naked Truth, to mark 50 years since The Sun first introduced Page 3.

== Opposition ==
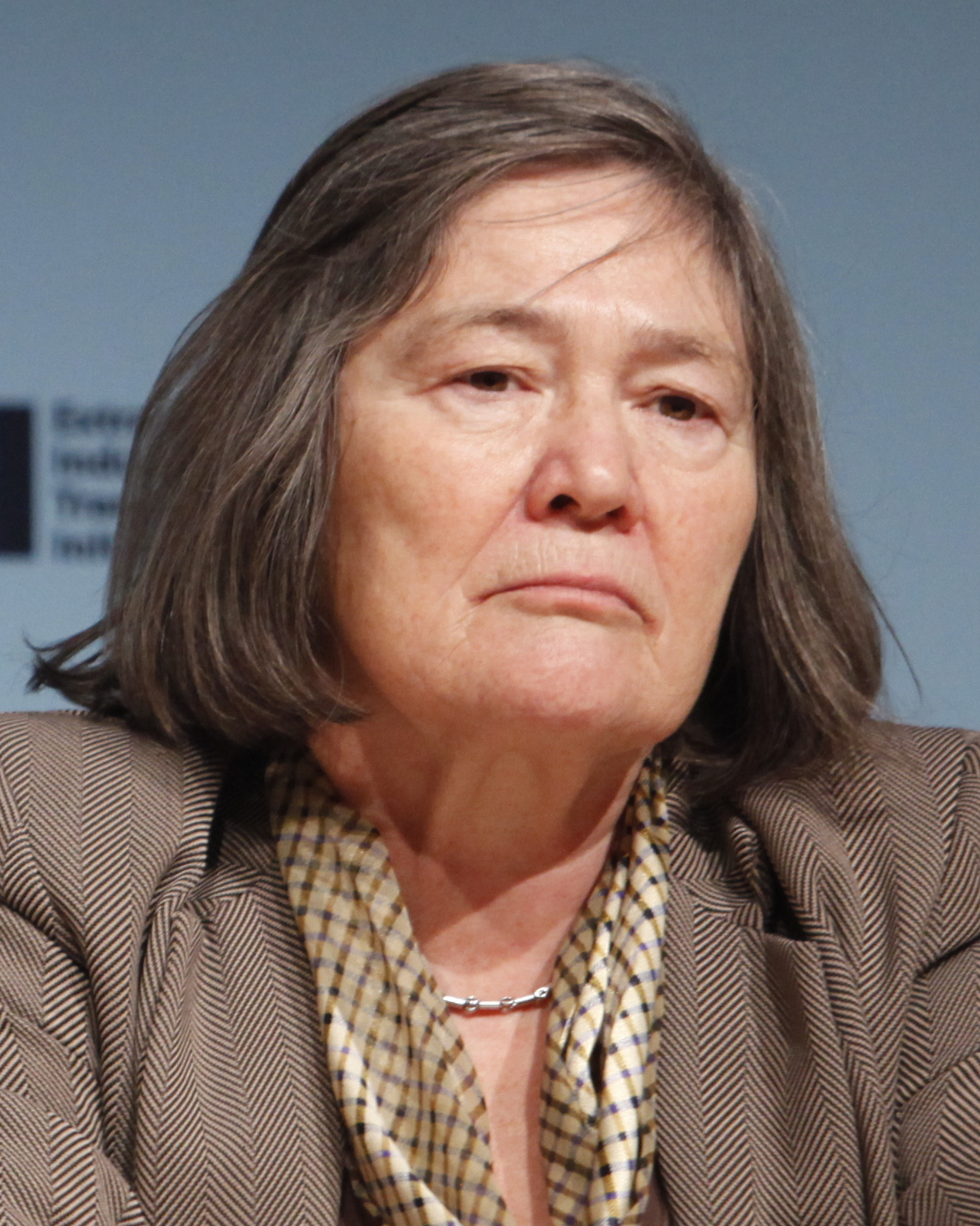
Labour Party MP Clare Short (photographed in 2011) began campaigning against Page 3 in the 1980s.

Page 3 was controversial and divisive throughout its history. Its defenders often characterised it as an inoffensive British cultural tradition, as when Conservative Party MP Richard Drax in 2013 called it a "national institution" that provided "light and harmless entertainment". Its critics generally considered Page 3 images demeaning to women or as softcore pornography that should not be published in national newspapers readily available to children. Some politicians—notably Labour Party MPs Clare Short, Harriet Harman, and Stella Creasy, Liberal Democrat MP Lynne Featherstone, and Green Party MP Caroline Lucas—made efforts to have Page 3 removed from newspapers. Meanwhile, The Sun vigorously defended the feature, typically representing Page 3's critics as prudes, spoilsports, or ideologues, while sometimes depicting female critics as physically unattractive and jealous. When Clare Short in 1986 tried to introduce a House of Commons bill banning topless models from British newspapers, The Sun ran a "Stop Crazy Clare" campaign, distributing free car stickers, calling Short a "killjoy", printing unflattering images of her, and polling readers on whether they would prefer to see Short's face or the back of a bus.

As a co-founder of Women in Journalism, Rebekah Brooks was reported to be personally offended by Page 3, and was widely expected to terminate it when she became The Sun's first female editor in 2003. However, upon assuming her editorship, Brooks defended the feature, calling its models "intelligent, vibrant young women who appear in The Sun out of choice and because they enjoy the job." When Clare Short stated in a 2004 interview that she wanted to "take the pornography out of our press", saying "I'd love to ban [Page 3 because it] degrades women and our country", Brooks targeted Short with a "Hands Off Page 3" campaign that included printing an image of Short's face superimposed on a topless woman's body, calling Short "fat and jealous", and parking a double-decker bus with a delegation of Page 3 models outside Short's home. The Sun also called Harman a "feminist fanatic" and Featherstone a "battleaxe" for their opposition to Page 3. Brooks later said that she regretted The Sun's "cruel and harsh" attacks on Short, listing them among the mistakes she had made as editor.

In February 2012, the Leveson Inquiry heard arguments for and against Page 3. Women's advocacy groups argued that Page 3 demeaned women and promoted sexist attitudes, but The Sun's then-editor Dominic Mohan called the feature an "innocuous British institution" that had become "part of British society". In his report, Lord Justice Leveson called Page 3 "a taste and decency issue" and stated that it thus fell outside his remit of investigating media ethics. Clare Short questioned Leveson's finding, stating: "Surely the depiction of half the population in a way that is now illegal on workplace walls and before the watershed in broadcasting, is an issue of media ethics?"

Lucy-Anne Holmes, a writer and actress from Brighton, began campaigning against Page 3 after noticing during the 2012 Summer Olympics that the largest photograph of a woman in the nation's best-selling newspaper was not of an Olympic athlete but of "a young woman in her knickers". Arguing that Page 3 perpetuated sexism, portrayed women as sex objects, negatively affected girls' and women's body image, and contributed to a culture of sexual violence, Holmes launched the No More Page 3 campaign in August of that year. The campaign collected over 240,000 signatures on an online petition and gained support from over 140 MPs, as well as a number of trade unions, universities, charities, and women's advocacy groups. It sponsored two women's soccer teams, Nottingham Forest Women F.C. and Cheltenham Town L.F.C., who played with the "No More Page 3" logo on their shirts.

Lynne Featherstone called for a ban on Page 3 in September 2012, claiming that it contributed to domestic violence against women. Then–deputy prime minister Nick Clegg expressed concern that banning the images would compromise freedom of the press, stating: "If you don't like it, don't buy it ... you don't want to have a moral policeman or woman in Whitehall telling people what they can and cannot see." In June 2013, Caroline Lucas defied parliamentary dress code by wearing a "No More Page Three" T-shirt during a House of Commons debate on media sexism. She stated: "If Page 3 still hasn't been removed from The Sun by the end of [2013], I think we should be asking the government to step in and legislate." Culture minister Ed Vaizey responded that the government did not plan to regulate the content of the press, saying that adults had the right to choose what they read. Then–prime minister David Cameron also declined to support a ban on Page 3, stating during an interview with BBC Radio 4's Woman's Hour: "This is an area where we should leave it to consumers to decide, rather than to regulators." After becoming The Sun's editor in June 2013, David Dinsmore confirmed he would continue printing photographs of topless models, calling it "a good way of selling newspapers".

== End of the feature ==
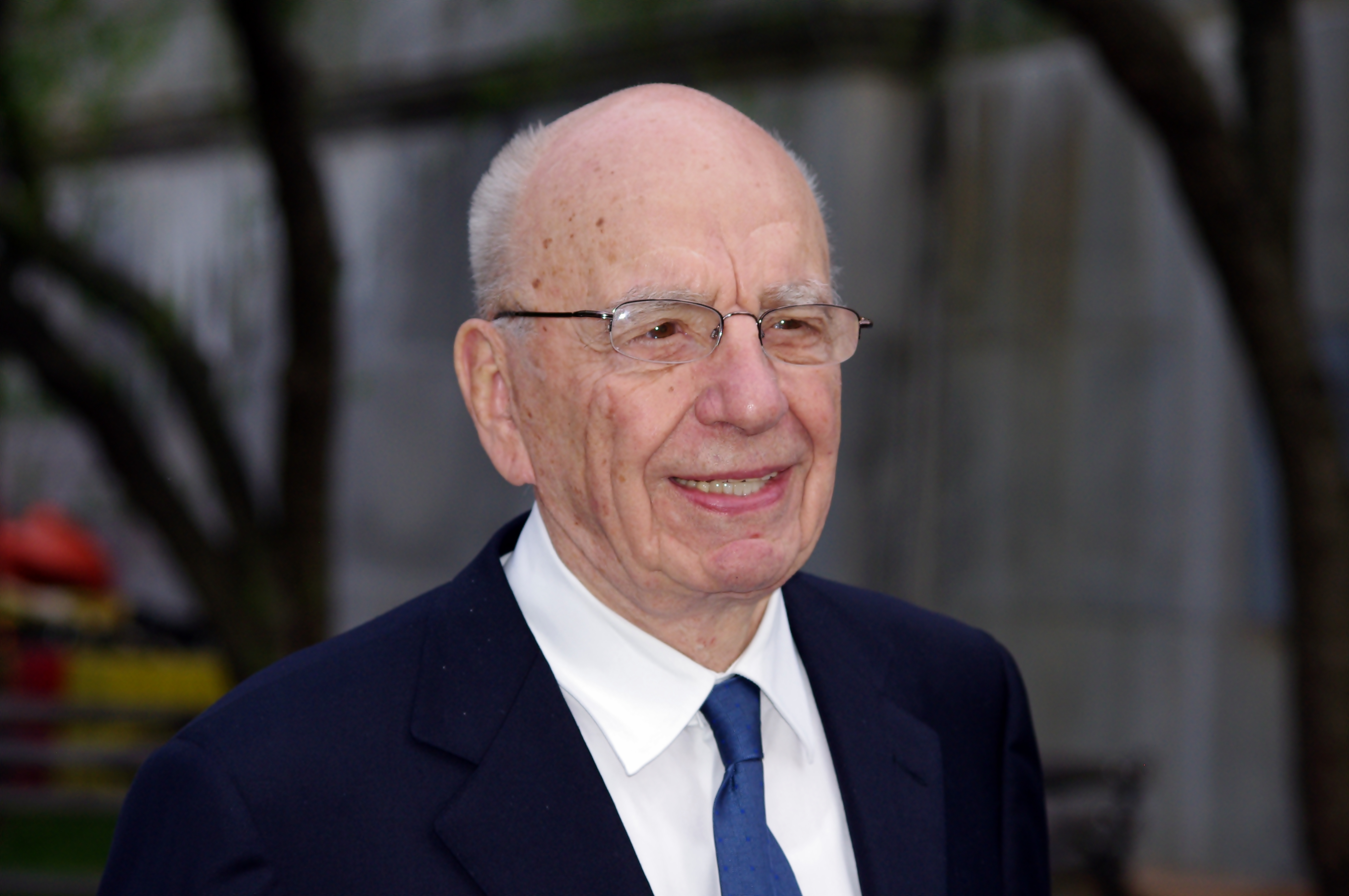
Rupert Murdoch, owner of The Sun, suggested in 2013 that Page 3 could transition to a "halfway house", featuring glamour models without showing nudity.

In February 2013, Rupert Murdoch suggested on Twitter that The Sun could transition to a "halfway house", featuring glamour photographs without showing nudity. In August 2013, editor Paul Clarkson replaced topless Page 3 girls with clothed glamour models in The Sun's Republic of Ireland edition, citing cultural differences between the UK and Ireland. The No More Page 3 campaign thanked Clarkson for "taking the lead in the dismantling of a sexist institution" and asked David Dinsmore to follow suit with The Sun's UK editions.

After publishing Page 3 for over 44 years, on 17 January 2015 The Sun began featuring images of women wearing lingerie and bikinis on its third page. On 20 January, The Times, another Murdoch title, reported that the tabloid was "quietly dropping one of the most controversial traditions of British journalism." The decision to discontinue Page 3 received significant media attention. On 22 January, The Sun appeared to change course, publishing a Page 3 image of a winking model with her breasts fully exposed and a caption mocking those who had commented on the end of the feature. However, The Sun did not feature Page 3 thereafter.

Longtime campaigner Clare Short called the decision to terminate the feature "an important public victory for dignity", while Nicky Morgan, then Minister for Women and Equalities, called it "a small but significant step towards improving the media portrayal of women and girls". A spokeswoman for the No More Page 3 campaign called it "truly historic news" and "a huge step for challenging media sexism". Caroline Lucas criticized the transition to clothed glamour, saying: "So long as The Sun reserves its right to print the odd topless shot, and reserves its infamous page for girls clad in bikinis, the conversation isn't over."

Some former Page 3 models defended the feature and the women who had appeared in it. Appearing on ITV's Good Morning Britain, model Nicola McLean called Page 3 models "strong-minded women" who "certainly don't feel like we have been victimised". In a televised debate with Harman and Germaine Greer, model Chloe Goodman challenged the other participants to explain why feminists were telling women how to live their lives. Harman responded: "In a hundred years' time, if you look back at the newspapers of this country, and you see women standing in their knickers with their breasts showing, what would you think about women's role in society?" Separately, Debee Ashby, who had first appeared on Page 3 in the 1980s at age 16, called its cancellation long overdue.

Despite abolishing the feature in its print editions, The Sun continued publishing topless images on its official Page3.com website until March 2017. No new online content appeared after that point, and the website was taken offline in 2018. In April 2019, The Daily Star shifted to a clothed glamour format, becoming the last mainstream print daily to discontinue printing topless images. This ended the tradition in the mainstream British press, with only the niche Sunday Sport continuing to publish topless images in tabloid format as of 2023.

== Notable Page 3 Girls ==
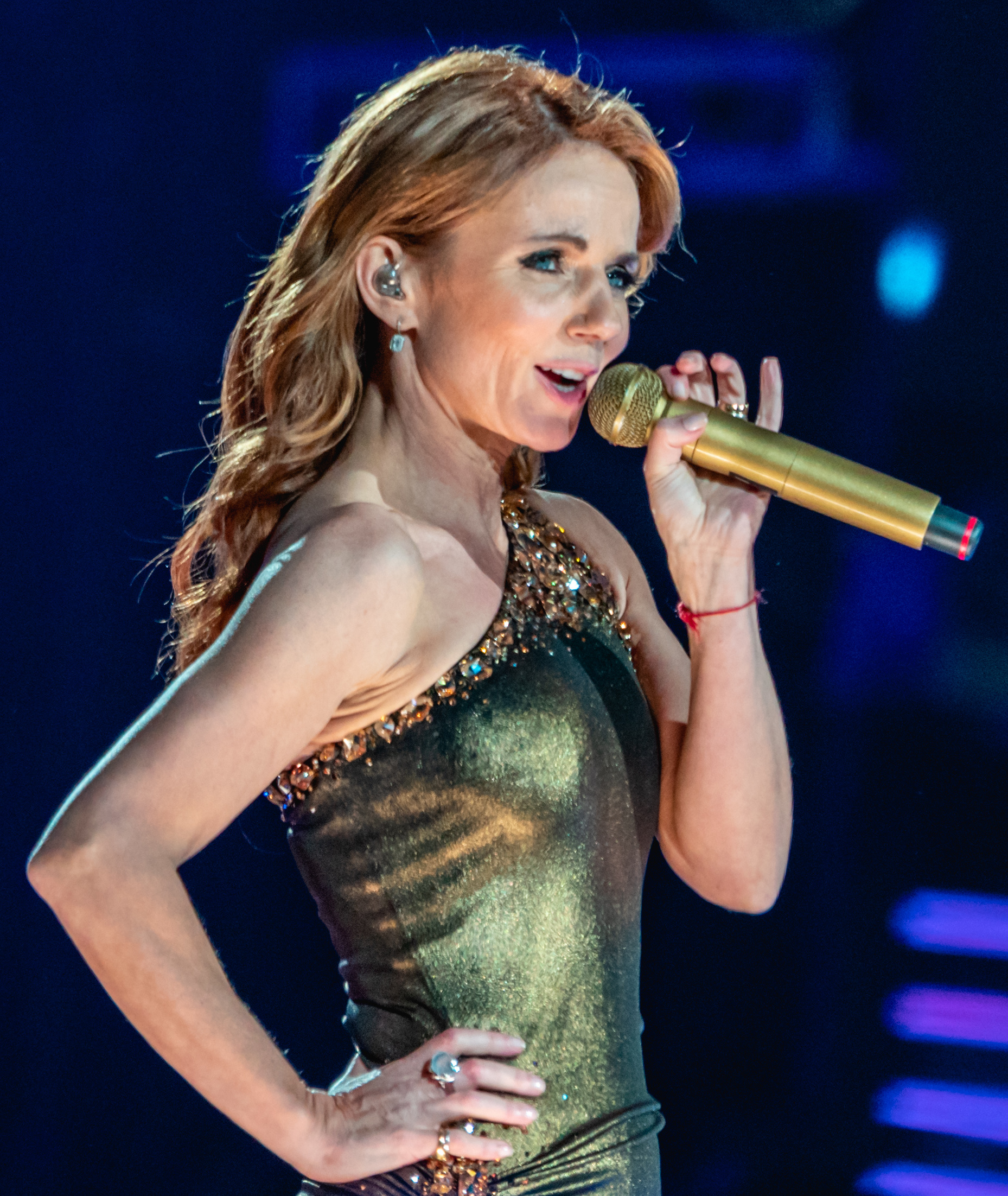
Geri Halliwell

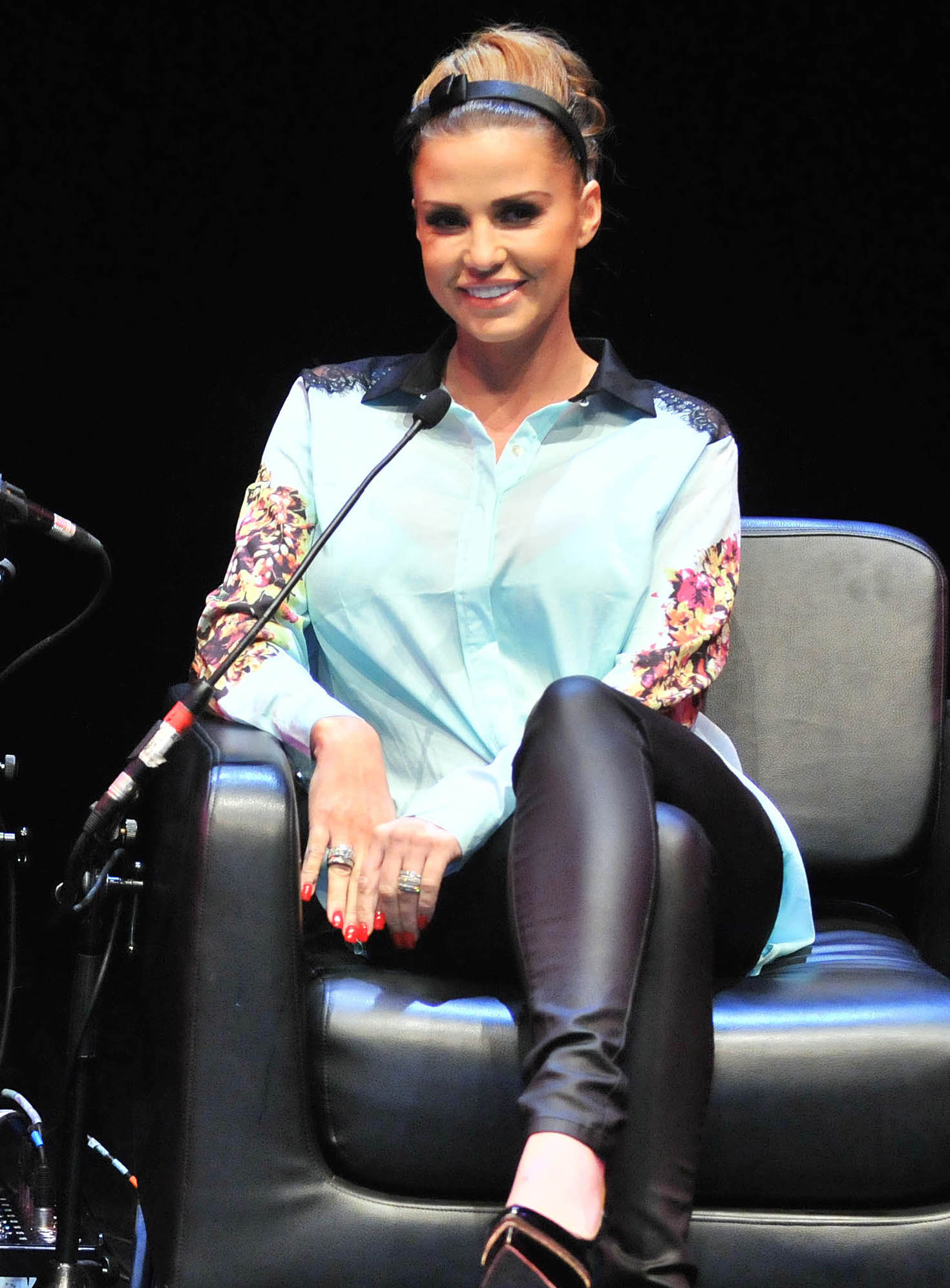
Katie Price

Women who have posed for Page Three include:

- Sian Adey-Jones, beauty pageant titleholder who won Miss Wales 1976, the second runner-up in Miss Universe 1976. She then finished first runner-up in Miss United Kingdom 1976 and competed as Miss Britain in Miss International 1977
- Chloe Ayling, model and media personality; known for surviving a kidnapping in 2017 and appearing on Celebrity Big Brother in 2018
- Marina Baker, politician and journalist who was previously the March 1987 Playboy Playmate
- Samantha Bentley, former pornographic actress
- Kelly Brook, actress and television personality who made appearances on Strictly Come Dancing, Britain's Got Talent, and I'm a Celebrity...Get Me Out of Here!
- Felicity Buirski, folk singer
- Alicia Douvall, television personality and entrepreneur known for her television appearances on Celebrity Love Island and Celebrity Big Brother
- Leilani Dowding, media personality and beauty pageant titleholder who won Miss Great Britain 1998, had features in Maxim and FHM, and later appeared on The Real Housewives of Cheshire
- Linzi Drew, former pornographic actress
- Samantha Fox, pop singer who was voted 'Favourite Page 3 Girl of the Year' three times (1984, 1985, 1986) as well as 'top Page 3 girl of all time'
- Cherri Gilham, writer, activist, and former actress
- Geri Halliwell, singer-songwriter, television personality, and author known for being an original member of the Spice Girls since the band's inception in 1994 under the stage name "Ginger Spice"
- Gail Harris, former pornographic actress
- Mo Hayder (1962–2021), author who previously worked as an actress under the stage name Candy Davis, most notably appearing as Miss Belfridge in the BBC sitcom Are You Being Served? for two series, while her novels have sold more than 6.5 million copies
- Keeley Hazell, model and actress
- Linda Lusardi, actress and television presenter
- Suzy Mandel, former actress
- Jodie Marsh, media personality and bodybuilder who has made notable appearances on Essex Wives and Celebrity Big Brother
- Linsey Dawn McKenzie, pornographic actress
- Nicola McLean, media and television personality with appearances on I'm A Celebrity, Get Me Out Of Here! and Celebrity Big Brother
- Melinda Messenger, television presenter and personality whose presenting credits include Fort Boyard, To Buy or Not to Buy, Golden Balls. She also appeared as a contestant on Celebrity Big Brother and Dancing on Ice
- Suzanne Mizzi (1967–2011), model and singer
- Lucy Pinder, model, television personality and actress who has appeared on FHM's list of the "100 Sexiest Women in the World" as well as Book at Bedtime with Lucy Pinder, Celebrity Big Brother and films such as Waarrior Savitri and Sharknado 5: Global Swarming
- Katie Price, television and media personality and businesswoman who has published 22 books, appeared on numerous reality series including Katie & Peter, I'm a Celebrity...Get Me Out of Here!, and Celebrity Big Brother where she finished as the winner
- India Reynolds, model and television personality who was a contestant on the fifth series of Love Island
- Danielle Sellers, model and television personality who appeared as a contestant on Love Island in 2017 and Love Island: All Stars in 2025
- Rhian Sugden, model and personality
- Nicola T, former model and television personality who appeared on WAGs Boutique and Celebrity Big Brother in 2010
- Dani Thompson, actress

== Television documentary ==
On the fiftieth anniversary of the Page 3 feature, British television carried a documentary titled Page Three: The Naked Truth on Channel Four, which aired on 17 June 2024. It included stories and updates about the lives of some of the women who appeared in the magazine over the years. After it aired, it was the most popular search term on Wikipedia, garnering 589,000 page views in a single day. For the month of June it tallied more than 800,000 views, against 25,000 for a typical month.

== Publications ==
- The Sun (1970s – January 2015)
- The Daily Mirror / Sunday People (1970s – 1980s)
- The Daily Star (1970s – April 2019)
- The Sunday Sport / Midweek Sport / Weekend Sport (1986 – present)
- The Daily Sport (1991 – April 2011)

== See also ==
- Page 3 culture
- Hot Shots Calendar
- Lad culture
- Lad mags
- Sunshine Girl

== Bibliography ==
- Perry, John (2005). Page 3 – The Complete History Laid Bare. News International Newspapers The Sun. ISBN 9781845792299.
