= Coverage of the Hillsborough disaster by The Sun =

News coverage of a human crush

The front page of The Sun on 19 April 1989 carried lies about fan behaviour during the Hillsborough disaster.

Coverage of the 1989 Hillsborough disaster by the British tabloid The Sun led to the newspaper's decline in Liverpool and the broader Merseyside region, with organised boycotts against it. The disaster occurred at an FA Cup semifinal football match between Liverpool and Nottingham Forest being held at Hillsborough Stadium in Sheffield. There were a total of 97 fatalities and 766 injuries from the disaster due to gross negligence by the South Yorkshire Police and ambulance services. On 19 April 1989, four days after the incident, The Sun published a front-page story with the headline "The Truth", containing a number of lies alleging that Liverpool supporters were responsible for the incident.

Though other newspapers reported stories critical of the fans, The Sun drew outrage among Liverpudlians for its repetition of unreliable claims as fact—including false claims by police officers—and its position in the aftermath of the events. From 1993 to 2012, editor Kelvin MacKenzie, who was in charge of many of the publication decisions, gave conflicting comments on whether he was sorry for the front-page story and said that his mistake was in trusting a Conservative Member of Parliament—Irvine Patnick, who was quoted in the piece. The Sun issued apologies in 2004, after Wayne Rooney was criticised for giving exclusive interviews to the paper, in 2012, under the headline "The Real Truth", and in 2016, on a page 8–9 story in the aftermath of a second governmental inquest that concluded fans were unlawfully killed in the disaster.

After a protest in Kirkby in which women burned copies of the newspaper, The Sun (referred to by critics as The S*n or The Scum) was widely boycotted in Merseyside. Sales have been estimated to have dropped from 55,000 per day in the region to 12,000 in 2019. Campaigns against the newspaper such as Total Eclipse of the Sun and Shun the Sun first aimed to decrease purchases of the tabloid, and then supply of it by retailers. Journalists from the paper have been denied access to interviews at Liverpool and Everton grounds. Chris Horrie estimated in 2014 that the boycott had cost The Sun's owners £15 million per month, in 1989 terms, since the disaster.

In 2024, it was reported that the paper's coverage of the disaster would form part of the materials used to train British Members of Parliament in how to identify misinformation.

== Prior to the Hillsborough disaster ==
Journalist and academic Chris Horrie argued that The Sun gave less attention to the Merseyside teams Everton and Liverpool than other football teams, giving as an example its coverage of the 1986 FA Cup Final between the pair, which it nicknamed "The Giro Cup" (in reference to a slang term for welfare), and its relatively scanty mention of a 9–0 win by Liverpool against Crystal Palace. He said that The Sun treated Liverpool as "effectively a foreign country" from the mid-1980s onwards, for the city's multiracial culture, left-wing politics and high rate of unemployment.

== Hillsborough disaster coverage ==
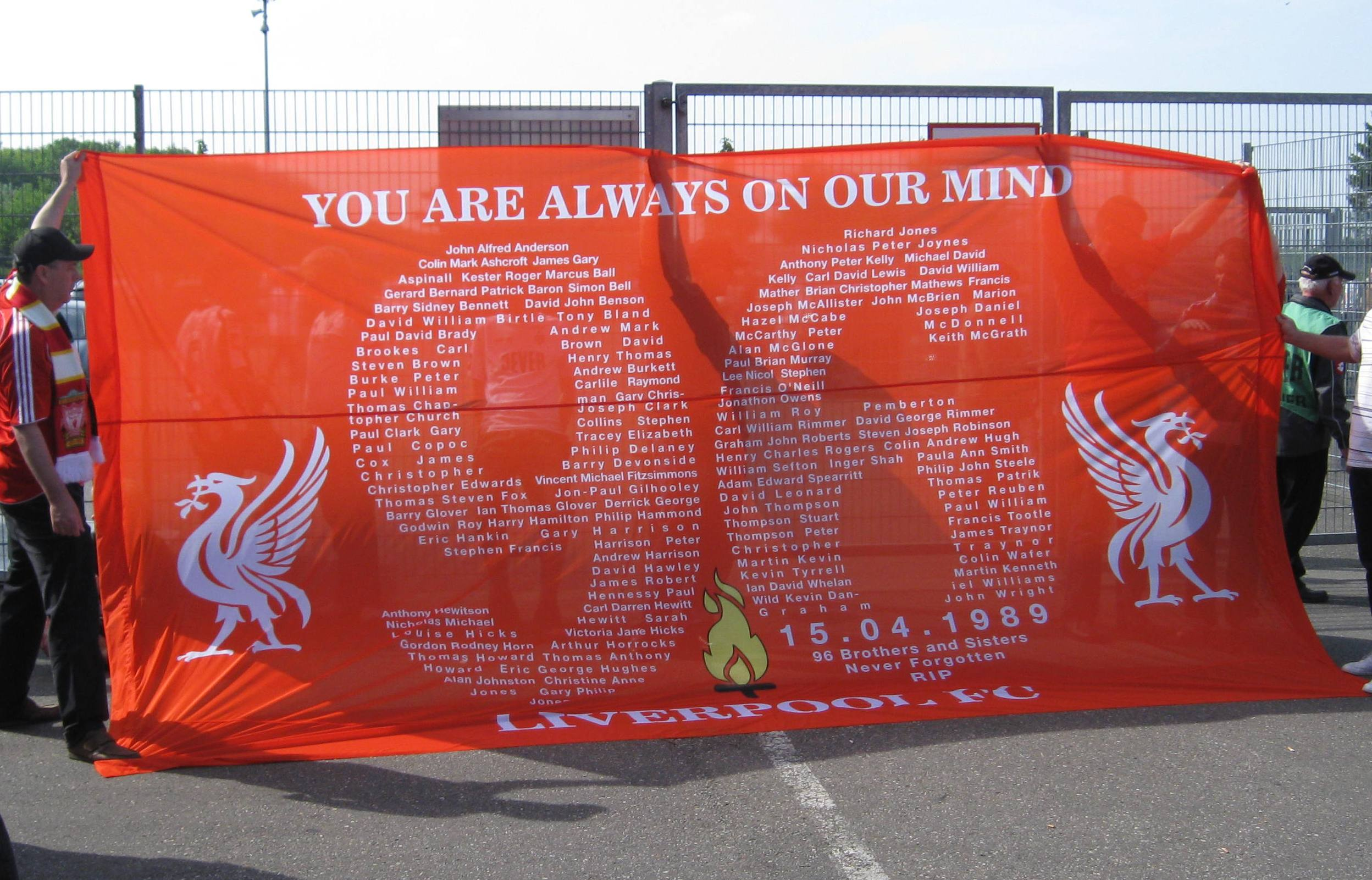
A banner commemorating the 20th anniversary of the Hillsborough disaster and the 96 people at the time (now 97) who had died from injuries sustained

On 15 April 1989, negligence by the South Yorkshire Police at a football match at Hillsborough Stadium between Liverpool and Nottingham Forest led to overcrowding in two central pens. In the crush, several hundred Liverpool fans were injured and 94 died on the day, with three more people subsequently dying from their injuries.

Three days later, under the editorship of Kelvin MacKenzie and with circulation figures of four million per day, The Sun published an editorial which accused people of "scapegoating" the police, saying that the disaster occurred "because thousands of fans, many without tickets, tried to get into the ground just before kick-off – either by forcing their way in or by blackmailing the police into opening the gates". Around 20 of the tabloid's journalists were sent to Liverpool or Sheffield to find negative information about Liverpool fans and victims of the crush.

The next day, its reporter Harry Arnold arranged a front-page story about fan behaviour during the crush. He claimed that MacKenzie said he would "make it clear that this is what some people are saying", but MacKenzie chose the headline "The Truth" after staff members convinced him not to use "You Scum". The story accused Liverpool fans of theft and of urinating on and attacking police officers and emergency services. The phrasing "some fans" was chosen, according to Harry Arnold, for legal reasons, as it could refer to as few as two individuals. The article quoted Conservative Member of Parliament Irvine Patnick in its claim that a group of Liverpool supporters told a police officer that they would have sex with a dead female victim. Its other source was a Sheffield news agency, Whites Press Agency, which later said that four South Yorkshire Police officers originated the claims. Police officer Gordon Sykes would later say at an inquest that he spread false allegations to Patnick and other police.

Other newspapers printed similar articles to The Sun. Documentarian Daniel Gordon said in 2016 that the headline "The Truth" was notorious, but "nearly every paper ran similar stories". However, other papers' stories were presented less prominently. Alex Hern of the New Statesman noted that the Daily Express's headline on the day of "The Truth" reported claims about fans as accusations by the police, rather than fact. The Daily Mirror, according to a later account by one of its reporters, received the same Whites Press Agency news agency filing that The Sun used, but dismissed it as untrue and instead ran with the more critical headline "Fury as police claim victims were robbed". The Liverpool Echo soon replied to The Sun, asking "the London papers and the Sheffield police" to give their evidence for claims of fan violence.

== Subsequent comments by The Sun and staff ==
The Anfield Wrap's Gareth Roberts said that what singled The Sun out was its "very resolute" response "in defending what it said". Managing editor William Newman told families of the victims who complained to him, "If the price of a free press is a boycott of our newspaper, then it is a price we will have to pay". Kenny Dalglish said in his autobiography that MacKenzie contacted him shortly after the tragedy, asking how to fix the situation. MacKenzie refused Dalglish's suggestion of printing "We Lied" in a headline the same size as they had used for "The Truth".

MacKenzie maintained for years that his "only mistake was to believe a Tory MP". In 1993, he told a House of Commons committee, "I regret Hillsborough. It was a fundamental mistake. The mistake was I believed what an MP said", but privately said at a 2006 dinner that he had only apologised under the instruction of Rupert Murdoch, believing: "all I did wrong was tell the truth ... I was not sorry then and I'm not sorry now". On Question Time the next year, MacKenzie publicly repeated the claims he said at the dinner; he said that he believed some of the material published in The Sun but was not sure about all of it. He said in 2012, "Twenty-three years ago I was handed a piece of copy from a reputable news agency in Sheffield in which a senior police officer and a senior local MP were making serious allegations against fans in the stadium ... these allegations were wholly untrue and were part of a concerted plot by police officers to discredit the supporters ... I published in good faith and I am sorry that it was so wrong". A member of the Hillsborough Families Support Group responded "too little, too late".

In 2004, Wayne Rooney gave exclusive interviews to The Sun after UEFA Euro 2004, receiving a six-figure paycheck. After widespread backlash throughout Liverpool, The Sun ran a front-page story apologising for "the most terrible mistake in its history", saying "We long ago apologised publicly ... We gladly say sorry again today: fully, openly, honestly and without reservation". It said criticism of Rooney was wrong and co-ordinated by the Liverpool Echo and Liverpool Post. The Liverpool Echo condemned the apology as "cynical and shameless".

In 2012, under the headline "The Real Truth", The Sun made a front-page apology, saying "we are profoundly sorry for false reports". The editor at the time, Dominic Mohan, wrote: "We published an inaccurate and offensive story about the events at Hillsborough. We said it was the truth - it wasn't ... for that we're deeply ashamed and profoundly sorry".

Following an April 2016 inquest, which found the 96 people to date who died in the disaster were unlawfully killed, The Sun was in a minority of newspapers not carrying the news on the front page. In a report on the eighth and ninth pages, it displayed images of the 96 victims and ran an editorial which apologised "unreservedly", saying "the police smeared [supporters] with a pack of lies which in 1989 The Sun and other media swallowed whole". A lengthier apology was published online.

== Merseyside boycott ==
=== Motivation ===
Families of the Hillsborough victims believe that coverage by The Sun interfered in the justice campaign and legal cases that continued until the April 2016 verdict. According to Davey Brett of Vice in 2017, Liverpudlians asked about the boycott discuss "struggle, solidaritary and strength in numbers ... community, compassion and coping". The campaign "kept people together" and made them "believe they could achieve something, even if just a little bit, even when it looked like there was no end in sight". Supporters value "challenging authority". Some staff at The Sun have said that boycotts are motivated by the lack of police accountability for causing the disaster. The managing editor in 2009, Graham Dudman, noted that "no police officer or ground official was ever convicted for the mistakes that led to the tragedy".

=== Actions ===
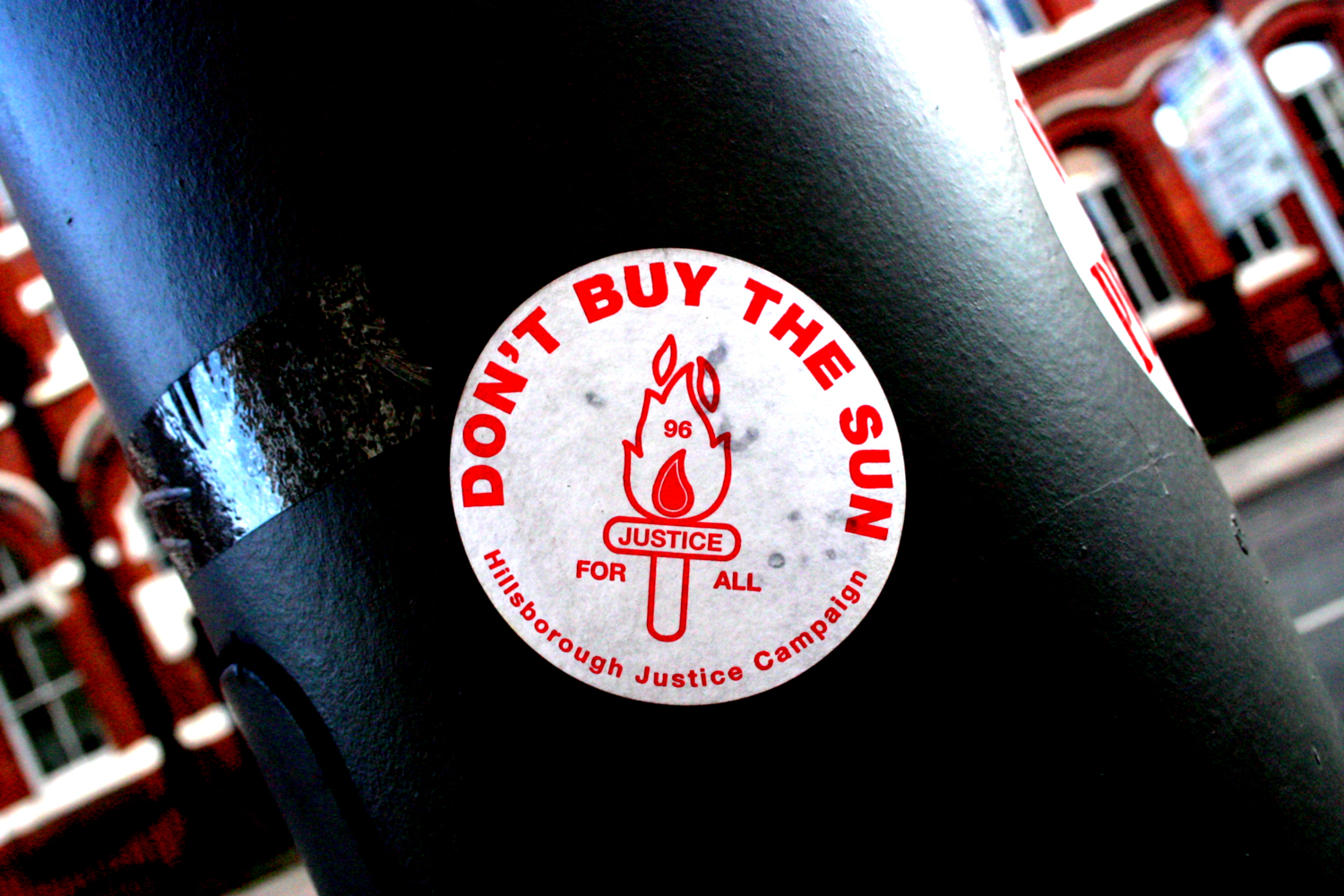
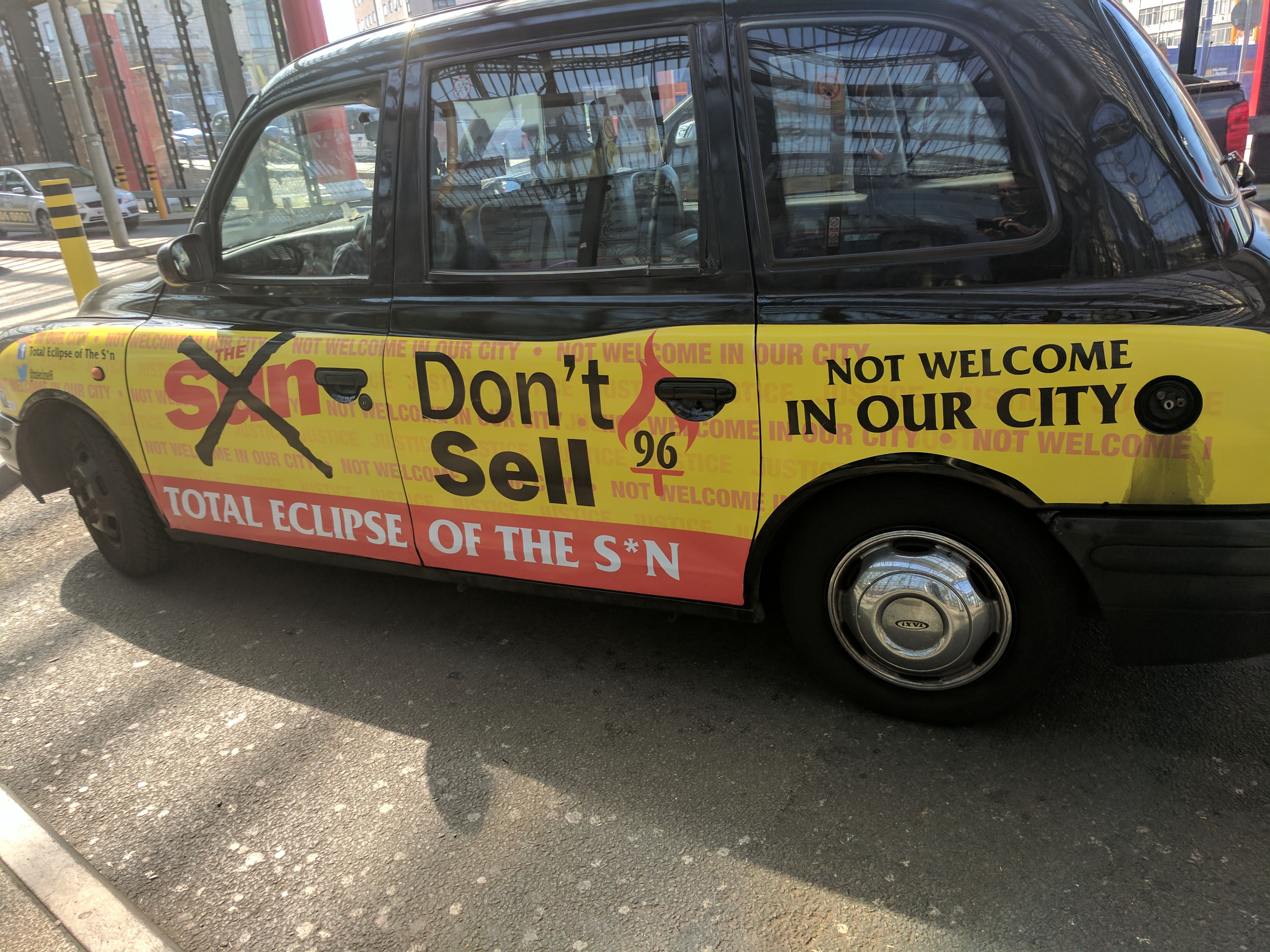
Boycott campaigns have urged consumers not to buy The Sun and retailers not to sell it.

A protest in Kirkby shortly after The Sun's "The Truth" headline featured women burning copies of the tabloid. Widespread boycotting of The Sun, alongside the News of the World, soon followed. The newspaper is widely known as The Scum within Liverpool. In the 2010s, Vice reported that early campaigns focused on persuading consumers not to purchase it, while later campaigns target supply. The Total Eclipse of the Sun and Shun the Sun initiatives, both of which paraphrased the newspaper name as The S*n, encourage newsagents and supermarkets not to sell the paper, and shops not to allow it on their premises. A member of Shun the Sun said that they were aiming for the movement to spread beyond Liverpool, and draw attention to other issues with The Sun than just Hillsborough. The publicist Max Clifford suggested that the boycott should end in 2011. Campaigns have been criticised on the grounds of censorship or freedom of speech.

Peter Hooton, the lead singer of Liverpudlian band The Farm, has been a campaign spokesperson. A 2011 anti-The Sun concert organised by the Hillsborough Justice Campaign featured artists including Mick Jones, James Dean Bradfield and The Farm; it developed into a national tour. Shortly afterwards, Billy Bragg released the song "Scousers Never Buy The Sun".

In 2016, Liverpool City Council passed a motion supported by Mayor of Liverpool Joe Anderson to urge local retailers not to sell The Sun. Anderson received criticism from Bob Satchwell from the Society of Editors for commenting that he "would ban it from shops across the city" if it were legal, as "that is what happens in dictatorships and banana republics". Around the same time, Merseytravel endorsed the Total Eclipse of the Sun campaign.

In 2017, journalists from The Sun were banned from Liverpool's Anfield stadium and Melwood training ground over its Hillsborough coverage. They were denied access from interviewing players or managers. The decision was undertaken after consulting families of those who died in the disaster, and the Total Eclipse of the Sun campaign. The ban extended a practice by the club of refusing The Sun exclusive interviews, but did not prevent them from accessing publicly accessible material or using external sources to write content.

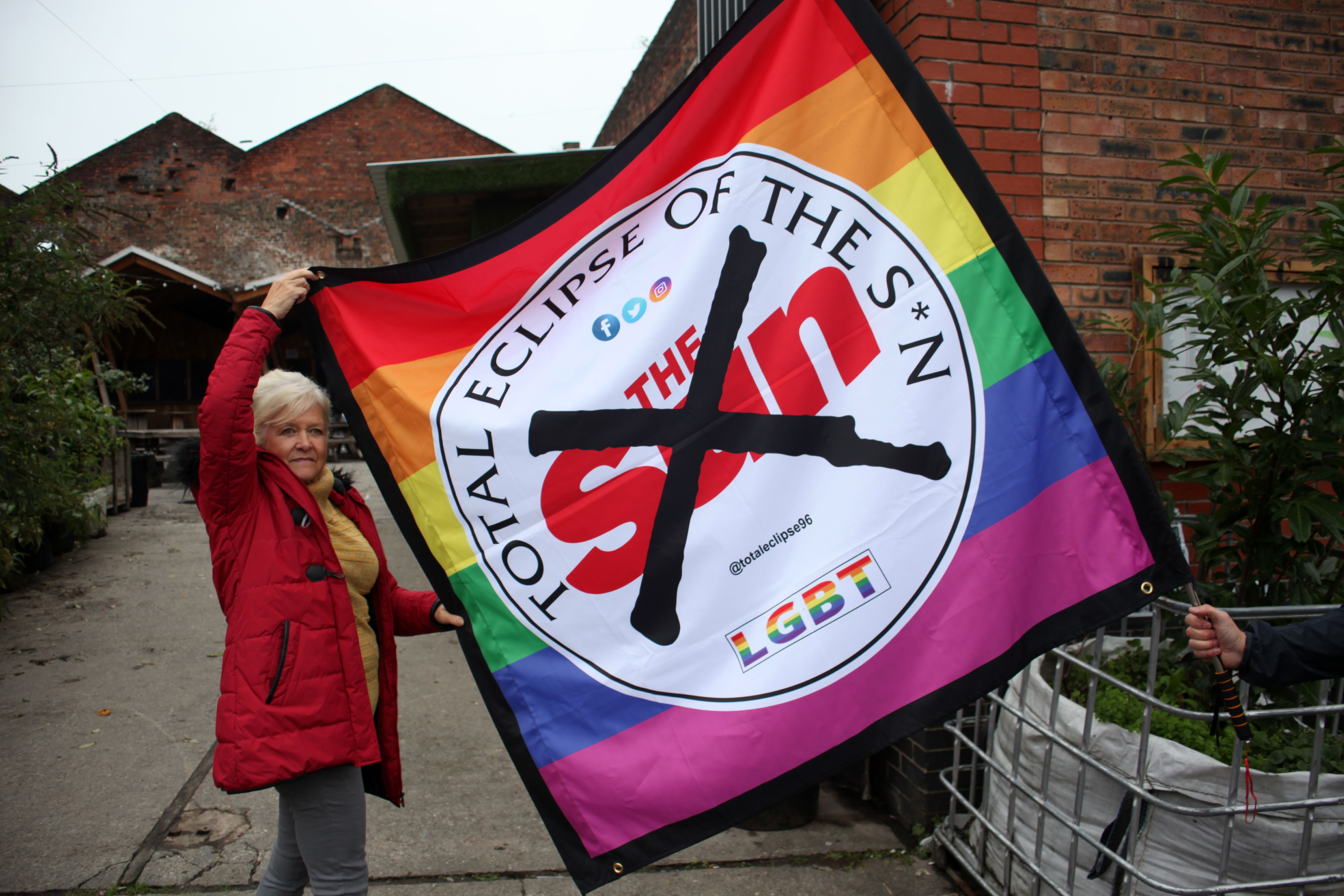
A pride flag emblazoned with the Total Eclipse of the Sun campaign logo

Relatedly, the newspaper was banned by Everton F.C. in April 2017 after publishing a column by MacKenzie, the day before the 28th anniversary of the Hillsborough disaster, that included a passage about footballer Ross Barkley that insulted his intelligence and compared him to a drug dealer and a prisoner. A picture of Barkley alongside a gorilla had the caption "Could Everton's Ross Barkley represent the missing link between man and beast?" Access to the club grounds and facilities for Sun reporters were blocked. Anderson described the article as "disgrace" and a "slur" on the city. He reported the article to the Independent Press Standards Organisation and Merseyside Police investigated whether it constituted a racial hate crime. MacKenzie was suspended as a contributor to the paper on the day of publication.

Support for boycotts elsewhere in the United Kingdom have followed campaigns by Merseyside-based groups, including in the aftermath of the 2016 inquest.

In October 2021, Keir Starmer, the leader of the Labour Party, wrote an article for The Sun about the Johnson government's handling of food and petrol shortages. This prompted a backlash among many Merseyside Labour Members of Parliament (MPs) due to the newspaper's coverage of the disaster. MPs included Alison McGovern, Bill Esterson, Kim Johnson, and Peter Dowd, with criticism also given by Steve Rotheram, the Metro Mayor of the Liverpool City Region, and Len McCluskey, a prominent trade unionist from Liverpool. Dowd wrote "I cannot in any way support, condone or make excuses for Keir Starmer writing for the S*n — whatever the reason" and Rotheram said "The piece published today has unsurprisingly upset a lot of people across my region. The S*n is not and never will be welcome here."

== Merseyside circulation ==
A boycott of The Sun began the day after its headline of "The Truth", with sales figures in Merseyside decreasing 40% overnight, according to Horrie. He estimated in 2014 that Liverpool's boycott of The Sun had cost its owners £15 million per month since the disaster, in 1989 prices. This is due to a combination of sales and advertisement revenue decreasing. The Financial Times reported in 2019 that Merseyside sales were estimated to have dropped from 55,000 per day to 12,000 per day, an 80% decrease.

A 2021 study in the American Political Science Review found that the Merseyside boycott of The Sun had led to reduced Euroscepticism than in comparable areas which were not boycotting The Sun. In the aftermath of the disaster, many people switched from The Sun to the pro-European Union Daily Mirror.
