= Harry Arnold (journalist) =

Harry Arnold (28 March 1941 – 8 November 2014) was a war correspondent and royal correspondent who worked for the Daily Mirror and The Sun.

He was born in Chatham, Kent. His parents died when he was young and he was raised by an uncle and aunt. He won a scholarship to the Sir Joseph Williamson's Mathematical School.

His first job was with the Chatham Observer. By age 21 he was working for the Extel (Exchange Telegraph) news agency. He joined The Sun soon after its launch in 1964. In 1972 he went to Derry to cover the Bloody Sunday shootings. In 1976 he became The Sun's royal correspondent.

He also covered the Hillsborough disaster—a human crush at a football stadium—leading to The Sun's infamous headline "The Truth". Arnold said in 2012 that he was "aghast" when he saw that Kelvin Mackenzie had attached the headline to his writing and that his piece was written "in a fair and balanced way". Arnold's article, published four days after the disaster, repeated false police claims that Liverpool fans had pickpocketed victims of the crush and urinated on officials.

He moved to the Daily Mirror in 1990, where he covered the Gulf War and the Kosovo War.

He was married to Mary, his fourth wife, and had four children. He died in 2014 aged 73, from liver cancer.
