= David Yelland =

David Yelland is the name of:

- David Yelland (actor) (born 1947), English actor
- David Yelland (journalist) (born 1963), English journalist and newspaper editor
