= Stuart Higgins =

British public relations consultant

- Born: c. 1956
- Occupation: Public relations consultant
- Years active: 1972–present
- Known for: Editor of The Sun (1994–1998); editor of the News of the World (1993–1994)

Stuart Higgins (born c. 1956) is a British public relations consultant and former newspaper editor.

In 1972 Higgins left school in Kingswood, on the outskirts of Bristol, and began his career as a reporter at the South West News, an agency founded by Roland Arblaster. He began working for The Sun in 1979 as their West Country reporter. He was arrested in 1982 by the police after being found with a Sun photographer "testing security" at Highgrove House, home of Charles, Prince of Wales.

At one point, Kelvin MacKenzie printed Higgins' direct phone number in The Sun, billed him as the "human sponge" and asked readers to call Higgins to "get things off their chest". In 1994, Higgins succeeded MacKenzie as editor of the newspaper. In 1996, Higgins wrote a front-page story about an intimate video purporting to feature Diana, Princess of Wales, with James Hewitt. The video turned out to be a hoax.

Higgins left The Sun in June 1998. On 11 November 2003, Labour MP Clive Soley, using parliamentary privilege, alleged that News International had paid £500,000 'hush money' to a female employee who had accused Higgins of sexual harassment during his time at The Sun. Soley also accused Rebekah Wade (now Brooks), then the newspaper's editor, of writing a threatening letter to the MP to discourage him from researching the issue.

Higgins subsequently set up his own public relations company, but sold the company in 2007. In February 2013, it was reported that Higgins was in Pretoria, South Africa, assisting athlete Oscar Pistorius, accused of murdering his girlfriend Reeva Steenkamp, in dealing with the press.

Media offices
Preceded by Martin Dunn	Deputy Editor of The Sun; 1990–1993	Succeeded by Neil Wallis
Preceded by Patsy Chapman	Editor of the News of the World; 1993–1994	Succeeded by Piers Morgan
Preceded by Kelvin MacKenzie	Editor of The Sun; 1994–1998	Succeeded by David Yelland
