= Ashley MacKenzie =

British media executive

Ashley MacKenzie is the son of Kelvin MacKenzie. Ashley worked as sales director at Talksport when Kelvin was in charge of the station. In July 2014 it was announced that Base79 was being sold to Rightster, with Ashley MacKenzie earning £7 million from the deal.. Having returned as CEO of Rightster Group Plc, Ashley turned the listed company around and rebranded it to Brave Bison PLC, heralding a new future to the business. He resigned from his role in 2018 and stepped down from the Board shortly after to found Fenestra, the programmatic advertising business, which he leads as Founder & CEO. He is an angel investor in and around the creator economy and wider media industry.
