= David Yelland (journalist) =

Former journalist and editor of The Sun

- Born: 1963 (age 62–63); Harrogate, Yorkshire
- Occupation: Journalist
- Known for: Former editor of The Sun
- Spouse: Charlotte Elston
- Children: 2

David Yelland (born 14 May 1963) is a journalist and former editor of The Sun and founder of Kitchen Table Partners. He was formerly an executive at Brunswick Group until 2015. Since 2023, he has co-presented the BBC Radio 4 podcast series When It Hits the Fan with Simon Lewis.

== Early life and education ==
Born in Harrogate, Yorkshire, Yelland was adopted at birth by Michael and Patricia Yelland of York. He has a younger brother, Paul. Yelland subsequently traced his birth father, the late John Sheridan, who was an Irish folk musician, newspaper executive and later peace campaigner and bookshop owner. In Sheridan's 2006 Guardian obituary, Yelland was confirmed as his son alongside his other children. Yelland's natural mother was a children's writer from Harrogate, who died before he could meet her. In childhood he had alopecia and after wearing a series of wigs he decided to go without them when he was 31 and living in New York.

Yelland was educated at Brigg Grammar School in Brigg, Lincolnshire, from 1976 to 1981, followed by Coventry Polytechnic (now Coventry University), where he obtained a BA in Economics. He was a founding member of the Social Democratic Party. He later studied at the Harvard Business School in 2003, sponsored by News International.

== Journalism ==
Yelland's first journalism post after university was at the Buckinghamshire Advertiser. He was a trainee with Westminster Press, then part of Pearson, and worked on a series of regional papers including the Northern Echo and the North West Times in Manchester. Yelland was hired as business editor on The Sun in 1992 by editor Kelvin MacKenzie, and became deputy editor of New York Post in 1995, as well as a speech writer for Rupert Murdoch.

=== Editorship of The Sun ===
He was editor of the tabloid newspaper The Sun from mid-1998 to January 2003. His predecessor was Stuart Higgins and his successor was Rebekah Wade.

One of Yelland's first editorials as editor was "Why the BBC should be shut down".

His editorship was largely liberal and in an interview with The Guardian towards the end of his editorship he described himself as "a progressive liberal". He did the same in an interview with Tim Burt in the Financial Times in 2002 which ran on the front of the media section. Yelland says his favourite headline was "Is this the most dangerous man in Britain?" about Tony Blair.

In November 1998, Yelland ran a front-page editorial asking whether Britain was being run by a "Gay Mafia", which provoked a backlash. Yelland went on to say his paper was "no longer in the business of destroying closet gays' lives... unless there is major public interest reason to do so".

In May 1999, Yelland published topless photos of Sophie Rhys-Jones, now the Duchess of Edinburgh, three days before her wedding to Prince Edward, Duke of Edinburgh with the headline "The Queen may not be amused by today's Sun... Relax, Your Majesty, Sophie Rhys-Jones is the best thing to happen to the Royals for YEARS. The fact she's been a fun-loving girl in her youth shows she's a right royal laugh."

During his editorship he regularly feuded with Piers Morgan of the Daily Mirror.

Yelland appeared on the BBC Today programme and wrote an opinion piece in The Guardian on 29 September 2013 arguing for reform of the press and for the Royal Charter on its future to be adopted.

Yelland has written a children's novel about a 10-year-old who tries to hide his father's alcoholism, titled The Truth about Leo, which was published by Penguin Books in April 2010.

Yelland became senior vice-chairman of the PR consultancy firm Weber Shandwick in 2004. He joined Brunswick in 2006. At Brunswick, he advised businesses on media and crisis management. His clients have included Lord Browne, Burberry, Ocado, Norman Foster, Tony Ball, Warner Music Group, Brookfield Multiplex, Tesco, Coca-Cola and Cadbury-Schweppes.

== Personal life ==
He married Tania Farrell in January 1996 at New York City Hall, but the couple divorced in 2004. Tania died from breast cancer in September 2006. Their son, Max, was born in Queen Charlotte's and Chelsea Hospital, Shepherd's Bush, London, in August 1998.

Yelland is now married to Charlotte Elston, director of communications at BBC Worldwide. On 30 September 2012 they announced the birth of their daughter in The Times.

Yelland said in 2009 that he checked into rehab for alcoholism in 2005 and has not drunk alcohol since. He said his novel was written both for children and adults, and a further theme is that of a young boy who has lost his mother. The book is dedicated to the memory of Tania, and to Max.

He is a Fellow of the Royal Society of Arts. He is a board member of the National Society for the Prevention of Cruelty to Children and in 2007 was appointed a Life Patron of the charity. He supports Manchester City Football Club. He was a board member of the National Campaign for the Arts from 2010 to 2012. He became a Trustee of Action on Addiction in 2012. He has been a Patron of the National Association for Children of Alcoholics since 2010.

Media offices
Preceded by Stuart Higgins	Editor of The Sun; 1998–2003	Succeeded by Rebekah Wade
