= Peter Chippindale =

British newspaper journalist and author

Peter Chippindale (4 July 1945 – 10 August 2014) was a British newspaper journalist and author. He was born to Keith and Ruth Chippindale in Northern India, where his father was a captain in the 11th Sikh regiment. As a child he attended Sedbergh School.

He worked initially for The Guardian newspaper and was sent to Belfast at the height of The Troubles. Chippindale reported on the Birmingham Six trial and that of the Guildford Four and "he thought they'd got the wrong men in both cases". His suspicions convinced Chris Mullin to investigate and led eventually to their acquittal.

In 1981 he worked on documentaries for London Weekend Television's The London Programme. He was news editor for the left wing News on Sunday and charted its demise with fellow ex-employee Chris Horrie in their book Disaster: The Rise and Fall of News on Sunday. He also co-wrote Stick It Up Your Punter!, a history of Rupert Murdoch's The Sun with Horrie.

== Bibliography ==
- Juntas United (1978) with Ed Harriman. Quartet Books. ISBN 978-0704332119.
- The Thorpe Committal (1979) Arrow Books. ISBN 978-0099204008.
- The British CB Book (1981)
- Disaster! The Rise And Fall of News on Sunday (1988) with Chris Horrie. Penguin. ISBN 978-0747402305.
- British Monarchy Plc: An Offer for Sale by Tender (1998) J. Bath. ISBN 978-1854200167.
- Stick It Up Your Punter! (1990) with Chris Horrie. ISBN 0434126241.
- Dished! (1991) with Suzanne Franks and Roma Felstein. Simon & Schuster.
- Life As Sutch (1991) HarperCollins. ISBN 978-0207172403.
- Mink! (1995) Pocket Books. ISBN 978-0671854201.
- Laptop of the Gods (1998) Simon & Schuster. ISBN 978-0684816135.
