= News on Sunday =

1987 British tabloid newspaper

- Type: Weekly newspaper
- Format: Tabloid
- Owner(s): Employees; Owen Oyston
- Editor: Keith Sutton
- Founded: 1987
- Ceased publication: 1987
- Political alignment: left-wing
- Headquarters: Whitworth Street, Manchester
- Circulation: 200,000 (at end)
- Website: none

The News on Sunday was a left-wing British tabloid newspaper. It was launched in April 1987. Publication ceased seven months later, in November 1987.

== Origins ==
The founders of the paper were former members of the left-wing group Big Flame and other radicals. They decided that a left-wing mass-circulation tabloid Sunday newspaper was possible and endeavoured to start one. The idea of the paper was originally thought up by Benjamin Lowe. The leaders were Ben Lowe, Alan Hayling, who became Chief Exec and Chris Bott who wrote the business and fundraising plan. They brought John Pilger on board as acting editor but Pilger left before the newspaper was launched. The decision to base its headquarters in Manchester was criticised as it was away from the centre of national political activity.

The paper gave a controlling interest to a collective of workers and its share issue raised £6.5 million from trade unions and Labour local authority pension funds. The funding team was led by Chris Bott, along with Nick Horsley the chair of Northern Foods and a representative from Guinness Mahan, the merchant bank. The money was raised largely from Trade Unions and local authorities plus £1000 investments from wealthy radicals. Left wing celebrities were persuaded to be supporters, including cartoonists such as Ralph Steadman, musicians who performed at the fundraising concert such as Sade and Terence Trent D'Arby plus comedians, actors, theatre directors and people in the media. Keith Sutton was appointed editor.

== Launch and bankruptcy ==
The advertisement campaign for the paper was carried out by BBH (Bartle, Bogle & Hegarty), who came up with the slogan "No tits but a lot of balls", in an attempt to distance the paper from those with images of topless women, and emphasise an overt political agenda not usually associated with tabloids. The slogan offended the feminists working on the paper and was subsequently dropped, though an element of the idea survived for the TV advert. The slogan used was "The paper that bites back".

The newspaper's attitude to news values, and the inexperience of its staff, was illustrated on the front page of its first edition on 26 April. The lead story was about a boy in Brazil who had to sell one of his kidneys to pay for medical care. Although most agreed that this was a worthwhile issue, the story was considered inappropriate as the lead story for a British Sunday paper.

The paper was not as successful as had been hoped. In order to break even, the paper had to sell 800,000 copies. The first issue sold 500,000 and by its eighth issue circulation had gone down to 200,000. The failure of the paper is attributed to inexperienced staff, "bad management, poor marketing, a commitment to political correctness and ideological purity at the expense of news values".

However the paper was kept afloat during the general election campaign thanks to the extension of an additional subordinated loan from the TGWU, so that its folding would not embarrass the Labour Party. It went bankrupt immediately after the election had been held and was purchased by Owen Oyston but finally closed down five months later, in November 1987.

Two ex-employees, Peter Chippindale and Chris Horrie, wrote a "withering" account of its demise called Disaster!.

== Editorial line ==
The newspaper was socialist in tone and internationalist in outlook. It supported the principle of self determination for all nations and regarded British society as 'based on the unequal ownership of wealth, prosperity and power'. It also believed that the root cause of the Troubles in Northern Ireland was the 'British presence in that country'. It supported trade unions when they went on strike and was against the 'imposition of suffering on animals'.
