= Graham Dudman =

English journalist

Graham Dudman (born 2 October 1963) is the former Managing Editor of The Sun newspaper.

On 28 January 2012, the BBC said it understood Dudman had been arrested in relation to the News International phone hacking scandal, by detectives investigating payments made to police by journalists.

In October 2014, Dudman's trial on four charges of conspiring to commit misconduct in a public office began, along with that of five other senior staff and journalists at The Sun newspaper. The trial related to illegal payments allegedly made to public officials, with prosecutors saying Dudman and the co-accused conspired to pay officials including police, prison officers and soldiers from 2002 to 2011. Specifically, Dudman and his co-defendants faced accusations of buying confidential information about the Royal Family, celebrities and prison inmates. They all denied the charges. On 17 April 2015, the Crown Prosecution Service announced that charges against Dudman over alleged payments to officials were to be dropped.
