= Kelvin MacKenzie =

English media executive (born 1946)

- Born: Kelvin Calder MacKenzie; 22 October 1946 (age 80); Thanet, Kent, England
- Occupation: Newspaper editor
- Spouses: Jacqueline Holland (m. 1968; div. 2006) Sarah McLean (m. 2008; div. 2017)
- Children: 3

Kelvin Calder MacKenzie (born 22 October 1946) is an English media executive and a former newspaper editor. He became editor of The Sun in 1981, by which time the publication had been established as Britain's largest-circulation newspaper. After leaving The Sun in 1994, he was appointed to executive roles in satellite television and other broadcasting outlets, as well as being involved in a number of publishing enterprises.

After short periods as a columnist at the Daily Mail and The Daily Telegraph, MacKenzie returned to The Sun as a columnist. His contract was terminated by mutual consent in May 2017, after he was suspended for comparing footballer Ross Barkley to a gorilla.

== Early life and career ==
MacKenzie was born in Thanet, Kent, to Ian and Mary MacKenzie, both journalists working for The South London Observer. He is of Scottish descent, with ancestors from Aberdeenshire.

When the South London Press took over their paper, Mary became press chief for the Conservative leader of the Greater London Council, Horace Cutler. Educated at Alleyn's School in Dulwich, MacKenzie left school with one O-level in English literature. He joined the South East London Mercury at 17 and, for the next ten years, worked on local and then national newspapers, including the Daily Express.

MacKenzie has said that, early in his career, he discovered that he had little writing ability and that his talents lay in making up headlines and laying out pages. By 1978, at the age of 32, he became managing editor of the New York Post, two years after it had been purchased by Rupert Murdoch.

== Editor of The Sun ==
After moving back to the United Kingdom, and a period as night editor of the Daily Express, Murdoch appointed MacKenzie to The Sun as editor in 1981. Conflict between the two mastheads meant that MacKenzie performed both jobs for a time.

In 1978, The Sun had overtaken the Daily Mirror as the newspaper with the highest sales in the UK. MacKenzie cemented the paper's image as a right-wing tabloid, not only increasing its profile, but also making it known for attacks on left-wing political figures and movements, and its sensationalist front-page celebrity exposés. They often proved to be misleading or false, and many controversies in that area occurred during MacKenzie's editorship. Commentators including The Guardian contributor Roy Greenslade, and journalist John Pilger, commented on the alleged "Murdoch effect". MacKenzie himself stated that he felt his own spell as editor of The Sun had a "positively downhill impact on journalism".

The paper was frequently accused of dumbing down public discourse because of its preoccupations. Pilger blamed it for the promotion of jingoism, racism, homophobia, and intolerance. It was widely criticised for its perceived cruelty both to the targets of Mackenzie's – sometimes false – allegations. Frequently, his choice of targets were not only left-wing politicians and celebrities, but also ordinary members of the public. His alleged cruelty to his own staff and colleagues was also criticised, to which MacKenzie later responded: "Look, I am not here to be helpful. I am here to help myself, right, so I have no regrets to how I treated some people."

=== Headlines ===
The sinking of the Belgrano during the Falklands War was celebrated on the front page of The Sun

"Freddie Starr Ate My Hamster", The Sun, 13 March 1986

MacKenzie was responsible for the "Gotcha" front-page headline of 4 May 1982, which reported the contentious sinking of the Argentinian cruiser General Belgrano by a British submarine during the Falklands War. MacKenzie was criticised for the headline, although he had actually changed the front-page of later editions to "Did 1,200 Argies drown?" after it was established that there had been a large number of Argentine casualties.

MacKenzie's coverage of the Falklands War was criticised by some commentators for being a glorification of war (Greenslade was working with MacKenzie on The Sun at the time).

MacKenzie was responsible for the "Freddie Starr Ate My Hamster" front-page headline. The claims made in the accompanying article, that the comedian had placed his girlfriend's hamster on a sandwich and ate it, turned out to be entirely untrue and was an invention of the publicist Max Clifford. That headline is often held up as the prime example of The Sun's supposedly celebrity-obsessed, sensationalist and often inaccurate journalism.

=== Politics ===
In the general elections which were held during his time as editor, MacKenzie's Sun strongly supported the Conservative Party and its policies.

Although the coverage of the 1992 election is particularly prominent, there were many other vitriolic personal attacks on Labour leaders by MacKenzie's Sun during elections, such as during the 1983 campaign, when MacKenzie ran a front page featuring an unflattering photograph of Michael Foot, then nearly 70 years old, alongside the headline "Do You Really Want This Old Fool To Run Britain?".

MacKenzie's coverage of the UK miners' strike of 1984–1985 was supportive of the actions of the police and the Thatcher government against the striking NUM miners. The paper was accused of making misleading or even outright false claims about the miners, their unions, and their leader Arthur Scargill. At one point, MacKenzie prepared a front page with the headline "Mine Führer" and a photograph of Scargill with his arm in the air, a pose giving the appearance of him making a Nazi salute. Print workers at The Sun, regarding it as being a cheap smear, refused to print it.

At the time of the 1987 general election, MacKenzie ran a mock-editorial entitled "Why I'm Backing Kinnock, by Stalin".

On the day of the 1992 election, MacKenzie used the front-page headline "If Kinnock Wins Today, Will The Last Person To Leave Britain Please Turn Out The Lights", accompanied by a picture of Kinnock's head superimposed over a lightbulb. Although the paper initially supported the government of John Major, because it appeared that Major shared the ideological hostility of Thatcher towards European integration, that soon changed. According to MacKenzie, following the UK's forced exit from the European Exchange Rate Mechanism on Black Wednesday in September 1992, Major telephoned him to ask how the paper would report the story. While Major has denied the conversation ever took place, MacKenzie has said his response was: "Prime Minister, I have on my desk in front of me a very large bucket of shit which I am just about to pour all over you."

=== False stories ===
In January 1987, MacKenzie published a completely untrue front-page story alleging that pop singer Elton John had engaged in sex with underage rentboys. Shortly afterwards, MacKenzie published another entirely false allegation that the singer had the voice boxes of his guard dogs removed because their barking kept him awake at night. Shortly after publication, MacKenzie confirmed the inaccuracy of that story by sending a reporter to the singer's house, who quickly discovered that all of John's guard dogs were quite capable of barking.

MacKenzie later said that he found it difficult to understand why he had believed, let alone published, the claims about the guard dogs, which he later realised were absurd. John sued The Sun for libel over both of the fallacious claims and was awarded £1,000,000 in damages in 1988.

MacKenzie later said of John:

I think The Sun should have its million quid back. It hasn't damaged him at all, has it? Libel can only have a value if there has been some kind of damage, right? Where is the damage? Where? There's nothing wrong with him. So no, I don't feel bad about him, not at all.

There were many other controversies during MacKenzie's time in charge of The Sun. At one point, he ran a story about a previously unknown member of the public who had just undergone a heart transplant operation. The story denounced the man as a "love rat", Sun journalists having been told that he had left his wife 15 years earlier. Aside from criticism about the story's highly questionable news value, the newspaper was furiously condemned as the story was run when the man's recovery was still in the balance.

MacKenzie and his team were accused of simply inventing many of the stories that appeared in the newspaper, as well as interviews and, in some instances, that proved to be the case, such as when an entirely fabricated interview with the disfigured Falklands war hero Simon Weston was published, which was criticised for "inviting readers to feel revulsion at his disfigurement". MacKenzie himself once told his staff: "Give me a Sunday for Monday splash on the royals. Don't worry if it's not true—so long as there's not too much of a fuss about it afterwards."

Some other controversies during MacKenzie's editorship include a headline describing Australian Aborigines as "The Abo's: Brutal and Treacherous", which was condemned as "inaccurate" and "unacceptably racist" by the Press Council, and MacKenzie's sending of photographers to break into a psychiatric hospital to ask actor Jeremy Brett, who was a patient there at the time, and who was suffering from manic depression and dying of cardiomyopathy, whether he was "dying of AIDS". The newspaper apparently suspected Brett of being a homosexual and that his mystery illness might be AIDS, which it was not.

Those incidents led to considerable criticism of The Sun, but the newspaper's profile increased dramatically during MacKenzie's time as editor, although sales figures dipped. On the subject of the sensationalist and sometimes inaccurate reporting which appeared in The Sun during his time as editor, MacKenzie said:

When I published those stories, they were not lies. They were great stories that later turned out to be untrue – and that is different. What am I supposed to feel ashamed about?

=== Hillsborough disaster coverage ===
The false allegations on The Sun's front page on 19 April 1989 caused widespread offence among Merseysiders, causing them to boycott the newspaper.

April 1989 saw the single biggest controversy during MacKenzie's period as editor, later described in a Sun editorial in 2004 as "the most terrible mistake in our history", occurred in the aftermath of the Hillsborough disaster, a crowd crush during an FA Cup semi-final at Hillsborough football stadium in Sheffield, which claimed the lives of 97 Liverpool fans.

Three days after the disaster, The Sun published an editorial which accused people of "scapegoating" the police, saying that the disaster occurred "because thousands of fans, many without tickets tried to get into the ground just before kick-off – either by forcing their way in or by blackmailing the police into opening the gates".

The next day, The Sun had the front-page headline, "The Truth", and accused Liverpool fans of theft, and of urinating on and attacking police officers and emergency services. It quoted Conservative Member of Parliament Irvine Patnick to support its claim that a group of Liverpool supporters told a police officer that they would have sex with a dead female victim. The journalist who wrote the first draft of the article, Harry Arnold, said that MacKenzie claimed he would "make it clear that this is what some people are saying", but MacKenzie chose the headline "The Truth" only after staff members convinced him not to use "You Scum". Its source was a Sheffield news agency, Whites, which later said that four South Yorkshire Police officers were the source of the claims, as well as "a leading MP backing many of the police claims".

The article was accompanied by graphic photographs showing Liverpool fans, including young children, choking and suffocating as they were being crushed against the perimeter fences surrounding the terraces – this was widely condemned as inappropriate.

In their book about the history of The Sun, Peter Chippindale and Chris Horrie wrote:

As MacKenzie's layout was seen by more and more people, a collective shudder ran through the office [but] MacKenzie's dominance was so total there was nobody left in the organisation who could rein him in except Murdoch. [Everyone] seemed paralysed, "looking like rabbits in the headlights", as one hack described them. The error staring them in the face was too glaring. It obviously wasn't a silly mistake; nor was it a simple oversight. Nobody really had any comment on it, they just took one look and went away shaking their heads in wonder at the enormity of it. It was a classic smear.

Prior to the publication of The Sun's initial article, a number of local newspapers in Yorkshire, including the Sheffield Star and The Yorkshire Post, published very similar allegations. It has since emerged that many British national newspaper editors were offered the same story from the same sources the day before The Sun article was published but, while many national newspapers printed allegations about Liverpool fans being responsible for the disaster, only MacKenzie and his counterpart at the Daily Star were prepared to print the more outlandish allegations about theft and the abuse of dead bodies, with many editors feeling that the claims sounded dubious.

For his part, Murdoch ordered MacKenzie to appear on BBC Radio 4's The World This Weekend in the aftermath of the controversy to apologise. MacKenzie said on the programme: "It was my decision and my decision alone to do that front page in that way and I made a rather serious error".

For years, MacKenzie maintained that his "only mistake was to believe a Tory MP". In 1993, he told a House of Commons committee, "I regret Hillsborough. It was a fundamental mistake. The mistake was I believed what an MP said". Next year, on Question Time, MacKenzie said that he believed some of the material he published in The Sun but was not sure about all of it. In 2012, he said: "Twenty-three years ago I was handed a piece of copy from a reputable news agency in Sheffield in which a senior police officer and a senior local MP were making serious allegations against fans in the stadium ... these allegations were wholly untrue and were part of a concerted plot by police officers to discredit the supporters ... I published in good faith and I am sorry that it was so wrong". A member of the Hillsborough Families Support Group responded "too little, too late".

A widespread boycott of The Sun throughout Merseyside followed immediately and continues to this day. The boycott involves customers refusing to purchase the paper, and retailers refusing to stock it. In 2019, the Financial Times reported that Merseyside sales were estimated to have dropped from 55,000 per day to 12,000 per day, an 80% decrease. In 2014, Chris Horrie estimated that, in 1989 prices, the tabloid's owner had lost £15 million per month since the disaster.

The Press Council described the allegations unequivocally as "lies". The official government enquiry into the disaster dismissed the allegation that drunken Liverpool fans had been responsible for the disaster, and concluded that inadequate crowd control and errors by the police had been the primary cause of the tragedy.

In 2024, it was reported that the Hillsborough coverage by The Sun would be used to train MPs to recognise false news stories.

== After editing The Sun ==
In January 1994, MacKenzie moved to BSkyB, another of Murdoch's News Corporation assets, but left after a few months.

In 1995, MacKenzie joined Mirror Group Newspapers and was appointed joint boss of its fledgling L!VE TV British cable television channel. The station had previously been headed by Janet Street-Porter, who had set out to establish L!VE TV as an alternative, youth-orientated station. She clashed with MacKenzie over programme content and soon left, leaving him in sole charge.

MacKenzie later said that he would agree to indulge in a "night of passion" with Janet Street-Porter and that he would be "willing", but only if she paid him £4.7m, a figure he had arrived at after calculating how much money he would lose from "loss of reputation, the negative impact on future earnings etc".

MacKenzie took a radically different approach to that of his predecessor and produced cheap, down-market programming. He introduced features such as nightly editions of "Topless Darts" (featuring topless women playing darts on a beach), "The Weather in Norwegian" (with a young, typically-blonde and bikini-clad Scandinavian woman presenting weather forecasts in both English and Norwegian) and other weather forecasts featuring dwarfs bouncing on trampolines.

A large amount of airtime was given over to tarot card readers and astrologers. One of L!VE TV's best known characters was the News Bunny, a man dressed as a giant rabbit who popped up during news broadcasts to give a thumbs up or a thumbs down to the various news stories, to indicate whether or not he found them interesting or exciting.

L!VE TV had a budget of only £2,000 an hour and attracted a small audience, with an average of 200,000 viewers, but became well known because of the controversy and criticism surrounding its programming. That led to the station being labelled "Tabloid TV" and even "Sun TV" (in reference to the newspaper. Some critics accused MacKenzie of doing nothing more than creating a television version of his old newspaper), and of taking a "shamelessly tacky approach". He left the station in 1997.

He later said on L!VE TV:

Bouncing weather dwarfs were a major milestone in British TV. Their weather forecasts will be five years old now. We used to shoot them in batches ... and it was just luck if the forecast actually coincided with the weather. We were really ahead of our time. If Channel 5 put on Topless Darts at 10 pm they would double their ratings.

The station failed and closed after less than four years.

In November 1998, MacKenzie headed a consortium, TalkCo Holdings, which purchased Talk Radio from CLT for £24.7 million. One of the financial backers was News International, News Corporation's UK subsidiary. In 1999, TalkCo was renamed The Wireless Group and, in January 2000, Talk Radio was rebranded as Talksport. The Wireless Group acquired The Radio Partnership in 1999, gaining control of its nine local commercial stations. In May 2005, it was announced that the Northern Irish media company, UTV plc, had made an agreed offer to buy the company, subject to shareholder and regulatory approval. In June 2005, the takeover proceeded, with MacKenzie being replaced by UTV executive Scott Taunton.

MacKenzie spent a year as chairman of one of the UK's largest marketing and communications groups, Media Square plc. That was unsuccessful and MacKenzie left a year later, in March 2007.

In March 2006, MacKenzie joined BBC Radio 5 Live as a presenter. He made his debut on the station over the summer, presenting a series of programmes telling the story of various scandals which have occurred at FIFA World Cup tournaments over the years. He then presented a retrospective look at the year gone by on Christmas Day.

In May 2006, MacKenzie returned to The Sun as a columnist, and was accused of using one of his articles to attack the people of Scotland (see below). On the subject of the columns themselves, he said "I want to get the Lonsdale Belt for vile and be personally rude to as many people as possible." In June 2011, it was announced that MacKenzie would leave The Sun to write a column for the Daily Mail.

In December 2016, during a civil court case, it emerged that MacKenzie had left The Sun because Rebekah Brooks, then head of News International, and Dominic Mohan, then editor of The Sun, had not told him of the extent of the company's phone hacking scandal. MacKenzie was also concerned about their employment of Jeremy Clarkson whose privacy injunction against his ex-wife was then in force. However he left the Mail in July 2012 after writing for the title for one year, citing an "increased commercial workload". Subsequently, The Guardian reported that MacKenzie's departure from the Mail was due to disagreements regarding the editing of his column.

MacKenzie was an early investor in online video company Base79, established in 2007 by his son Ashley MacKenzie. They sold the firm in 2014.

In 2011, MacKenzie launched the online TV channel Sports Tonight, describing the channel as "Sky Sports News meets TalkSport". The channel received investment from former Conservative Party treasurer Lord Ashcroft, who took a minority stake.

MacKenzie joined The Daily Telegraph as an online columnist in 2013, but he was dropped by the newspaper after one column, with Roy Greenslade reporting in The Guardian that he was let go because staff on the Telegraph sports desk were annoyed about his role in the false reporting on the Hillsborough disaster, in particular, football columnist and ex-Liverpool player Alan Hansen, who had played at Hillsborough.

In April 2013, The Guardian reported that the Daily Mail was being sued for libel for £200,000 over a column by MacKenzie. The claim was brought by an NHS doctor, Antonio Serrano, who MacKenzie had criticised in an article.

In October 2014, MacKenzie was a contestant on gameshow Pointless Celebrities. Some angered viewers complained about MacKenzie's presence to host Richard Osman, who said that if he had known in advance, he would not have let him appear.

In December 2014, The Sun announced that MacKenzie would make a second return to the newspaper as a columnist.

== Politics ==
MacKenzie has remained committed to Conservative, Thatcherite politics. He championed Margaret Thatcher as the UK's greatest post-war prime minister for the BBC's Daily Politics in 2007.

In May 2008, MacKenzie stood for election as a local councillor in Elmbridge. He lost the election, gaining 227 votes, whereas the Conservative incumbent, Glenn Dearlove, won 679.

That same year, after Conservative member of parliament David Davis announced that he would resign his seat in the House of Commons in order to fight a by-election as a protest against the Labour government's plans for 42-day detention without charge for terrorist suspects, MacKenzie announced that he was likely to contest the election on a pro-42-day detention platform, stating: "I have been associated with The Sun for 30 years. The Sun is very, very hostile to David Davis because of his 28 day stance and The Sun has always been very up for 42 days and perhaps even 420 days". Off-camera, before a BBC interview, MacKenzie referred to Hull, which the Haltemprice and Howden constituency borders, as "an absolute shocker". Asked to clarify those comments, he said it was "a joke" and that he has "never actually been to Hull".

MacKenzie subsequently decided not to run for the Haltemprice and Howden seat, stating: "The clincher for me was the money. Clearly The Sun couldn't put up the cash – so I was going to have to rustle up a maximum of £100,000 to conduct my campaign."

== Later developments in the Hillsborough controversy ==
=== Incidents in 2006–2007 ===
During an after-dinner speech to Newcastle-based law firm Mincoffs Solicitors on 30 November 2006, MacKenzie is reported to have said of his coverage of the Hillsborough disaster:

All I did wrong there was tell the truth. There was a surge of Liverpool fans who had been drinking and that is what caused the disaster. The only thing different we did was put it under the headline "The Truth". I went on The World at One the next day and apologised. I only did that because Rupert Murdoch told me to. I wasn't sorry then and I'm not sorry now because we told the truth.

MacKenzie went on to compare Merseysiders with animal rights activists. "If this got out, it would blow up all over again", MacKenzie is said to have remarked.

The remarks were met with widespread incredulity and condemnation, particularly on Merseyside, where Liverpool F.C., the local Liverpool Echo and numerous local MPs condemned MacKenzie, with Walton MP Peter Kilfoyle arguing that the quotes confirmed that MacKenzie was "never fit to edit a national newspaper". The Liverpool Echo called for The Sun to sack MacKenzie as a columnist. The Sun issued a statement saying that they had "already apologised for what happened and we stand by that apology." However, despite reports of consternation at The Sun over MacKenzie's statements, the newspaper chose to retain him as a columnist. MacKenzie refused to comment publicly on the controversy and pulled out of a scheduled appearance on BBC television's Question Time later that week.

Earlier that autumn MacKenzie had already provoked controversy in Liverpool by stating in a Press Gazette interview that he had never knowingly printed any lies in The Sun and that even stories which later turned out to be untrue were still "good stories". In relation to the publishing of false or misleading reports in The Sun, MacKenzie asked "What am I supposed to feel ashamed about?" MacKenzie was not specifically referring to the coverage of the Hillsborough disaster and made no mention of the tragedy during the interview, but the Liverpool Echo published a piece reporting MacKenzie's statements and criticising the apparent lack of shame or regret over the Hillsborough coverage implied by them (and the fact that MacKenzie may still regard the misleading coverage as a "good story").

Although there was actually little reaction to the quotes on Merseyside at the time, they did draw comment from Phil Hammond, chairman of the Hillsborough Family Support Group, who said: "I can't believe that even after all these years, there is no remorse or regret for the hurt he caused". It was still thought at this point however that, although MacKenzie appeared not to regret the coverage, he no longer regarded it as having any factual basis after his apparent admissions in the past that the allegations made were lies fed to him by police officers and a Conservative MP.

In February 2007, Independent journalist Matthew Norman claimed that MacKenzie was considering issuing a public apology for his coverage of the Hillsborough disaster, although at the time he was "still unsure" as to whether to do so. His former colleague at The Sun, Roy Greenslade has suggested that the real reason why MacKenzie may be so hesitant to apologise and admit the inaccuracy of the coverage may be his "anti-Scouse" bias, which Greenslade suspects makes it difficult for MacKenzie to "bring himself to say sorry to the city's people".

=== Fan exoneration (2012) ===
On 12 September 2012, following the publication of the official report into the disaster using previously withheld government papers which has exonerated the Liverpool fans present at the match, MacKenzie issued the following statement:

Today I offer my profuse apologies to the people of Liverpool for that headline. I too was totally misled. Twenty three years ago I was handed a piece of copy from a reputable news agency in Sheffield [White's] in which a senior police officer and a senior local MP [Sheffield Hallam MP Irvine Patnick] were making serious allegations against fans in the stadium. I had absolutely no reason to believe that these authority figures would lie and deceive over such a disaster. As the Prime Minister has made clear these allegations were wholly untrue and were part of a concerted plot by police officers to discredit the supporters thereby shifting the blame for the tragedy from themselves. It has taken more than two decades, 400,000 documents and a two-year inquiry to discover to my horror that it would have been far more accurate had I written the headline 'The Lies' rather than 'The Truth'. I published in good faith and I am sorry that it was so wrong.

Trevor Hicks, chairman of the Hillsborough Family Support Group, rejected Mr MacKenzie's apology as "too little, too late", calling him "lowlife, clever lowlife, but lowlife". The copy from White's news agency was available to other newspapers, who reported the story as allegations – The Sun reported the allegations, on McKenzie's say-so, as 'the truth'.

Following the Warrington Inquests verdicts, Mackenzie was door-stepped by Alex Thomson of Channel 4 News. MacKenzie was filmed saying: "Please Alex, this isn't reasonable". Nine complaints were received by Ofcom asserting MacKenzie's privacy had been invaded, but in its adjudication, the regulator rejected the application.

=== Comments in 2016–2017 ===
Despite apologising on a number of platforms, in 2016, MacKenzie made a joke in The Sun newspaper that if it was true that George Osborne (the then Chancellor of the Exchequer) was putting gongs up for sale, he should be made Lord MacKenzie of Anfield (Liverpool FC's home stadium).

A day before the 28th anniversary of the Hillsborough disaster in April 2017, MacKenzie's column in The Sun mentioned the Everton footballer Ross Barkley appearing to imply Barkley deserved to be beaten up in a nightclub incident earlier in the week. Comparing the player to a "gorilla at the zoo", MacKenzie was accused of racism (Barkley is of part-Nigerian descent). The column was removed from the newspaper's website on the afternoon of its day of publication. Later in the day, a spokesman for the newspaper apologised "for the offence caused" and said the columnist "has been suspended from the paper with immediate effect. The views expressed by Kelvin Mackenzie about the people of Liverpool were wrong, unfunny and are not the view of the paper". A month after the column appeared, it was announced that MacKenzie's "contract with News Group Newspapers", the Sun's publishers, "has been terminated by mutual consent".

In response to MacKenzie's article, on the day of its publication Everton FC banned The Sun and its reporters "from all areas of its operation" following Liverpool FC who had made such a decision about The Sun in February 2017.

== Views ==
=== Scotland ===
MacKenzie has criticised Scotland, although he is of Scottish descent – his grandfather was from Stirling.

In July 2006, MacKenzie wrote a column for The Sun referring to Scots as "Tartan Tosspots" and apparently rejoicing in the fact that Scotland has a lower life expectancy than the rest of the United Kingdom. MacKenzie's column provoked a storm of protest and was heavily condemned by numerous commentators including Scottish MPs and MSPs.

On 11 October 2007, MacKenzie appeared on the BBC's Question Time TV programme and launched another attack on Scotland. During a debate about tax, MacKenzie said that:

Scotland believes not in entrepreneurialism like London and the south-east... Scots enjoy spending [money] but they don't enjoy creating it, which is the opposite to down south.

The comments came as part of criticism of prime minister Gordon Brown, whom MacKenzie said could not be trusted to manage the British economy because he was "a socialist Scot", and stating that this was relevant to the debate. Fellow panellist Chuka Umunna from the think tank Compass called his comments "absolutely disgraceful", and booing and jeering were heard from the Cheltenham studio audience. The BBC received around 200 complaints and MacKenzie's comments drew widespread criticism, including comments from the Scottish entrepreneur Duncan Bannatyne who responded on BBC Radio 5 Live:

It is plainly wrong for MacKenzie to assert that Scottish people do not understand business and enterprise. There are some phenomenal Scottish entrepreneurs, I could name so many. I think Kelvin MacKenzie is a raving lunatic, I think he's a complete idiot and a racist idiot at that.

On 13 January 2012, MacKenzie once again appeared on the BBC's Question Time and remarked on the move for Scottish independence:

My sense about England right now is that they wish Scotland to be independent. They want them, they want them to go out there and make their way in the world and see if they are as clever as they believe they are.

=== Hijabs ===
In July 2016, after the Nice (France) truck attack, MacKenzie wrote an article for The Sun in which he queried whether it was appropriate for Channel 4 News presenter Fatima Manji to read the news wearing a hijab. Manji accused MacKenzie of attempting to "intimidate Muslims out of public life" and attempting to smear 1.6 billion Muslims in suggesting they are inherently violent. She said, "He has attempted to smear half of them further by suggesting they are helpless slaves. And he has attempted to smear me by suggesting I would sympathise with a terrorist".

The Independent Press Standards Organisation (IPSO) received 17 complaints about Manji wearing the hijab, an objection which was rejected. Eventually, the IPSO received 1,700 complaints about MacKenzie's article. The IPSO ruled in October 2016 that MacKenzie was "entitled" to make his comments, and a "prejudicial or pejorative reference" to Manji's religion was not present in the article. Manji said the ruling meant it was now "open season on minorities, and Muslims in particular".

== Personal life ==
MacKenzie married Jacqueline Holland in 1968 in Camberwell. They had a daughter (born 1969) and two sons (born 1972 and 1974). His elder son and his daughter worked at Talkradio. In the late 1990s, MacKenzie was featured in The Mail on Sunday, holidaying in what the paper described as a "love nest" in Barbados with News International secretary Joanna Duckworth.

Media offices
Preceded by Larry Lamb	Editor of The Sun; 1981–1994	Succeeded by Stuart Higgins
