= Chris Horrie =

British journalist

Chris Horrie is a journalist, author and lecturer specializing in investigative journalism, finance and profiles of major public figures.

As a freelance feature writer his work can be found in The Independent, the Independent on Sunday, the Evening Standard, The Mail on Sunday, The Observer, the New Statesman and The Guardian.

== Authored books ==
Horrie is also the author or co-author of several books, usually concerning major media figures:

- 2009: True Blue – Strange Tales from a Tory Nation (with David Matthews). (Fourth Estate/HarperCollins)
- 2008: Chapters on Investigative Journalism and the Law; and a practical guide to the Freedom of Information Act for Investigative Journalists in the second edition of Investigative Journalism: Context and Practice, Hugo de Burgh ed, (Routledge)
- 2007: Play It Again – tie-in book for the primetime BBC 1 television series of the same name. (Harper Collins)
- 2004: ‘Tabloid Nation’ – from the birth of the Daily Mirror to the death of the tabloid (André Deutsch)
- 2002: ‘Premiership’. Unauthorised business history of the Premier League (Simon and Schuster)
- 1994: Fuzzy Monsters: fear and loathing at the BBC (Heinemann)
- 1992: Sick as a Parrot: the inside story of Tottenham Hotspur PLC take-over.
- 1990: Stick it up your Punter: the rise and fall of The Sun, Heinemann. co written with Peter Chippindale
- 1990: What is Islam? (W.H. Allen/The Observer)
- 1988: Disaster - the rise and fall of News on Sunday, with Peter Chippindale (Sphere Books)

== Academic roles ==
Chris Horrie was the Head of the Department for Film, Media and Journalism at Staffordshire University until April 2018.

He has previously held lecturing roles at the University of Winchester and Salford University.
