= The Sun (United Kingdom) =

British tabloid newspaper

- Forward with the people

- Front page of The Sun, 7 October 2013
- Type: Daily newspaper (and Sunday newspaper from 26 February 2012)
- Format: Tabloid
- Owner: News UK
- Editor: Victoria Newton
- Founded: 15 September 1964; 62 years ago
- Political alignment: Conservatism (Note: In general, The Sun shows populist views. It is generally classified as a pro-Tory and right-wing conservative newspaper. Some view it as a centre-left newspaper.); Populism; Right-wing politics Euroscepticism
- Headquarters: 1 London Bridge Street, London, SE1 9GF
- Circulation: 1,210,915 (as of March 2020)
- ISSN: 0307-2681
- OCLC number: 723661694
- Website: thesun.co.uk

The Sun is a British tabloid newspaper, published by the News Group Newspapers division of News UK, itself a wholly owned subsidiary of News Corp. It was founded as a broadsheet in 1964 as a successor to the Daily Herald, and became a tabloid in 1969 after it was purchased by its current owner. The Sun had the largest daily newspaper circulation in the United Kingdom, but was overtaken by freesheet rival Metro in March 2018.

The paper became a seven-day operation when The Sun on Sunday was launched in February 2012 to replace the closed News of the World and employed some of its former journalists. In March 2020, the average circulation for The Sun was 1.21 million, The Sun on Sunday 1,013,777.

The Sun has been involved in many controversies in its history, with one of the most notable being its coverage of the 1989 Hillsborough disaster. Regional editions of the newspaper for Scotland (The Scottish Sun), Northern Ireland (The Sun), and the Republic of Ireland (The Irish Sun) are published in Glasgow, Belfast, and Dublin, respectively. There is currently no separate Welsh edition of The Sun; readers in Wales receive the same edition as the readers in England.

== History ==
=== The Sun before Rupert Murdoch ===
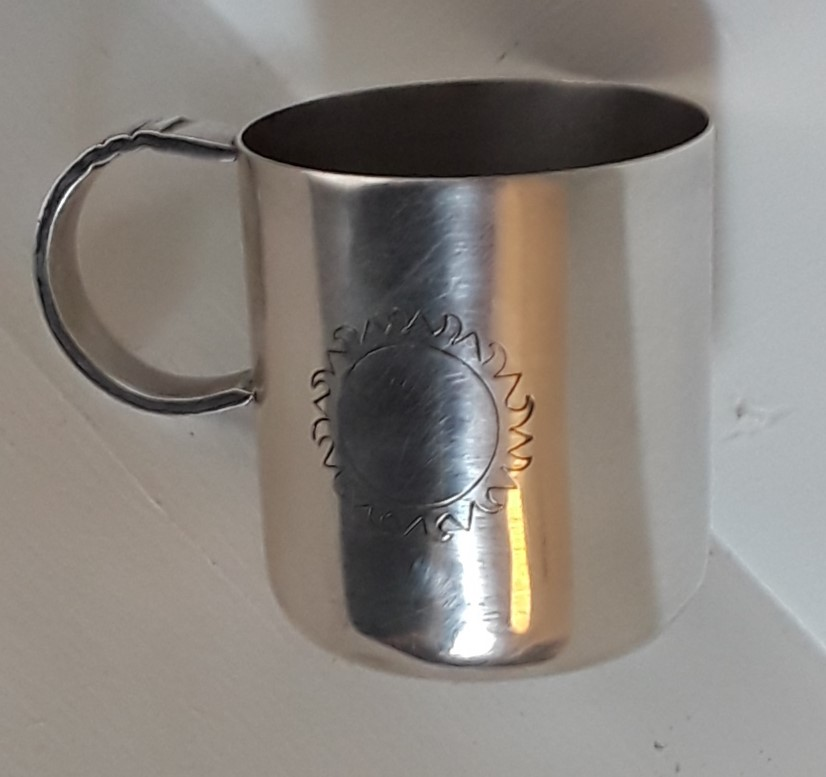
First day of issue promotional silver christening mug

The Sun was first published as a broadsheet on 15 September 1964, with a logo featuring a glowing orange disc. It was launched by owners IPC (International Publishing Corporation) to replace the failing Daily Herald on the advice of market researcher Mark Abrams. The paper was intended to add a readership of "social radicals" to the Herald's "political radicals". Of Abrams' work, Bernard Shrimsley wrote that 40 years later there supposedly was "an immense, sophisticated and superior middle class, hitherto undetected and yearning for its own newspaper.... As delusions go, this was in the El Dorado class". Launched with an advertising budget of £400,000, the brash new paper "burst forth with tremendous energy" according to The Times. Its initial print run of 3.5 million was attributed to "curiosity" and the "advantage of novelty", and had declined to the previous circulation of the Daily Herald (1.2 million) within a few weeks.

By 1969, according to Hugh Cudlipp, The Sun was losing about £2 million a year, and had a circulation of 800,000. IPC decided to sell to stop the losses, according to Bernard Shrimsley in 2004, out of a fear that the unions would disrupt publication of the Mirror if they did not continue to publish the original Sun. Bill Grundy wrote in The Spectator in July 1969 that although it published "fine writers" in Geoffrey Goodman, Nancy Banks-Smith and John Akass among others, it had never overcome the negative impact of its launch at which it still resembled the Herald. The pre-Murdoch Sun was "a worthy, boring, leftish, popular broadsheet" in the opinion of Patrick Brogan in 1982.

Robert Maxwell, a book publisher and Member of Parliament who was eager to buy a British newspaper, offered to take it off their hands and retain its commitment to the Labour Party but admitted there would be redundancies, especially among the printers. Rupert Murdoch, meanwhile, had bought the News of the World, a sensationalist Sunday newspaper, the previous year, but the presses in the basement of his building in London's Bouverie Street were unused six days a week.

Seizing the opportunity to increase his presence on Fleet Street, Murdoch made an agreement with the print unions by promising fewer redundancies if he acquired the newspaper. He assured IPC that he would publish a "straightforward, honest newspaper" which would continue to support Labour. IPC, under pressure from the unions, rejected Maxwell's offer, and Murdoch bought the paper for £800,000, to be paid in instalments. He would later remark: "I am constantly amazed at the ease with which I entered British newspapers".

=== Early Murdoch years ===
The Daily Herald had been printed in Manchester since 1930, as was the Sun after its original launch in 1964. Murdoch stopped publication there in 1969, which put the ageing Bouverie Street presses under extreme pressure as circulation grew. Additionally, Murdoch found he had such a rapport with Larry Lamb over lunch that other potential recruits as editor were not interviewed and Lamb was appointed as the first editor of the new Sun. Lamb wanted Bernard Shrimsley to be his deputy, which Murdoch accepted as Shrimsley had been the second name on his list of preferences.

Lamb was scathing in his opinion of the Daily Mirror, where he had recently been employed as a senior sub-editor, and shared Murdoch's view that a paper's quality was best measured by its sales. Lamb regarded the Mirror as overstaffed and too focused on an ageing readership. Godfrey Hodgson of The Sunday Times interviewed Murdoch at this time and expressed a positive view of the rival's "Mirrorscope" supplement. Dropping a sample copy into a bin, Murdoch replied: "If you think we're going to have any of that upmarket shit in our paper, you're very much mistaken".

Lamb hastily recruited a staff of about 125 reporters, who were mostly selected for availability rather than their ability. That was about a quarter of what the Mirror then employed, and Murdoch had to draft in staff on loan from his Australian papers. Murdoch immediately relaunched The Sun as a tabloid and ran it as a sister paper to the News of the World. The Sun used the same printing presses, and the two papers were managed together at senior executive levels.

The tabloid Sun was first published on 17 November 1969, with a front page headlined "HORSE DOPE SENSATION", an ephemeral "exclusive". An editorial on page 2 announced: "Today's Sun is a new newspaper. It has a new shape, new writers, new ideas. But it inherits all that is best from the great traditions of its predecessors. The Sun cares. About the quality of life. About the kind of world we live in. And about people". The first issue had an "exclusive interview" with the Labour Prime Minister Harold Wilson on page 9. The paper copied the rival Daily Mirror in several ways. It was the same size and its masthead had the title in white on a red rectangle of the same colour as the Daily Mirror. These papers are now known as red tops. The Mirror's "Live Letters" was matched by "Livelier Letters".

Sex was used as an important element in the content and marketing of the paper from the start, which Lamb believed was the most important part of his readers' lives. The first topless Page 3 model appeared on 17 November 1970, Stephanie Rahn; she was tagged as a "Birthday Suit Girl" to mark the first anniversary of the relaunched Sun. A topless Page 3 model gradually became a regular fixture, and with increasingly risqué poses. Both feminists and many cultural conservatives saw the pictures as pornographic and misogynistic. Lamb later expressed some regret at introducing the feature, although he denied it was sexist. A Conservative council in Sowerby Bridge, Yorkshire, was the first to ban the paper from its public library, shortly after Page 3 began, because of its excessive sexual content. Shrimsley, Lamb's deputy, came up with the headline, "The Silly Burghers of Sowerby Bridge" to describe the councillors. The decision was reversed after a sustained campaign by the newspaper itself lasting 16 months, and the election of a Labour-led council in 1971.

The Labour MP Alex Lyon waved a copy of The Sun in the House of Commons and suggested the paper could be prosecuted for indecency. Sexually related features such as "Do Men Still Want To Marry A Virgin?" and "The Way into a Woman's Bed" began to appear. Serialisations of erotic books were frequent; the publication of extracts from The Sensuous Woman while copies of the book were being seized by Customs produced a scandal and a significant amount of free publicity.

Politically, The Sun in the early Murdoch years nominally continued to support Labour. It advocated a vote for the Labour Party led by Harold Wilson in the 1970 UK general election, with the headline "Why It Must Be Labour"; but by February 1974, it was calling for a vote for the Conservative Party led by Edward Heath and suggesting that it might support a Labour Party led by James Callaghan or Roy Jenkins. In the October election, an editorial asserted: "ALL our instincts are left rather than right and we would vote for any able politician who would describe himself as a Social Democrat". In the 1975 referendum on Britain continuing membership of the European Economic Community, it advocated a vote to stay in the Common Market.

The editor, Larry Lamb, was originally from a Labour background with a socialist upbringing though his temporary replacement Bernard Shrimsley (1972–1975) was a middle-class uncommitted Conservative. An extensive advertising campaign on the ITV network that was voiced by actor Christopher Timothy, may have helped The Sun to overtake the Daily Mirror's circulation in 1978. Despite the industrial relations of the 1970s with the so-called "Spanish practices" of the print unions, The Sun was very profitable, enabling Murdoch to expand his operations to the United States from 1973.

=== Thatcher years ===
==== Changes ====
The paper endorsed the Conservative Margaret Thatcher in the 1979 UK general election at the end of a process which had been under way for some time although The Sun had not initially been enthusiastic about Thatcher. On 3 May 1979, it ran the unequivocal front-page headline, "VOTE TORY THIS TIME". The Daily Star had been launched in 1978 by Express Newspapers, and by 1981 had begun to affect sales of The Sun. Bingo was introduced as a marketing tool, and a 2p drop in cover price removed the Daily Star's competitive advantage, opening a new circulation battle which resulted in The Sun neutralising the threat of the new paper. The new editor of The Sun, Kelvin MacKenzie, took up his post in 1981 just after those developments, and, according to Bruce Page, "changed the British tabloid concept more profoundly than [Larry] Lamb did". Under MacKenzie, the paper became "more outrageous, opinionated and irreverent than anything ever produced in Britain".

==== Falklands War ====
Front page of The Sun (4 May 1982) in early editions following the torpedoing of the Belgrano. This headline was published before it was known the sinking of the vessel had cost 368 lives.

The Sun became an ardent supporter of the Falklands War. The coverage "captured the zeitgeist" according to Roy Greenslade, assistant editor at the time (though privately an opponent of the war) but was also "xenophobic, bloody-minded, ruthless, often reckless, black-humoured and ultimately triumphalist". On 1 May, The Sun claimed to have "sponsored" a British missile. Under the headline "Stick This Up Your Junta: A Sun missile for Galtieri's gauchos", the newspaper published a photograph of a missile (actually a Polaris missile stock shot from the Ministry of Defence) which had a large Sun logo printed on its side with the caption "Here It Comes, Senors..." under it. The paper explained that it was "sponsoring" the missile by contributing to the eventual victory party on HMS Invincible when the war ended. In copy written by Wendy Henry, the paper said that the missile would shortly be used against Argentinian forces. Tony Snow, The Sun journalist on Invincible who had "signed" the missile, reported a few days later that it had hit an Argentinian target.

One of the paper's best known front pages, published on 4 May 1982, commemorated the torpedoing of the Argentine ship the General Belgrano by running the story under the headline "GOTCHA". At MacKenzie's insistence, and against the wishes of Murdoch (the mogul was present because almost all the journalists were on strike), the headline was changed for later editions after the extent of Argentinian casualties became known. John Shirley, a reporter for The Sunday Times, witnessed copies of this edition of The Sun being thrown overboard by sailors and marines on HMS Fearless.

After HMS Sheffield was wrecked by an Argentinian attack, The Sun was heavily criticised and even mocked in the Daily Mirror and The Guardian for its coverage of the war, and as the wider media queried the veracity of official information and worried about the number of casualties, The Sun gave its response. "There are traitors in our midst", wrote leader writer Ronald Spark on 7 May, accusing commentators on Daily Mirror and The Guardian, plus the BBC's defence correspondent Peter Snow, of "treason" for aspects of their coverage. The satirical magazine Private Eye mocked and lampooned what they regarded as the paper's jingoistic coverage, most memorably with the mock-Sun headline "KILL AN ARGIE, WIN A METRO!", to which MacKenzie is said to have jokingly responded, "Why didn't we think of that?"

==== The Sun and the Labour Party ====
These years included what was called "spectacularly malicious coverage" of the Labour Party by The Sun and other newspapers. During the 1983 UK general election, The Sun ran a front page featuring an unflattering photograph of Michael Foot, then aged almost 70, claiming he was unfit to be Prime Minister on grounds of his age, appearance and policies, alongside the headline "Do You Really Want This Old Fool To Run Britain?" A year later, The Sun made clear its enthusiastic support for the re-election of Ronald Reagan as president of the United States; Reagan was two weeks shy of his 74th birthday when he started his second term, in January 1985. On 1 March 1984, the newspaper extensively quoted an American psychiatrist claiming that British left-wing politician Tony Benn was "insane", with the psychiatrist discussing various aspects of Benn's supposed pathology. The story, which appeared on the day of the Chesterfield by-election in which Benn was standing, was discredited when the psychiatrist quoted by The Sun publicly denounced the article, describing the false quotes attributed to him as "absurd". The Sun had apparently fabricated the entire piece. The newspaper made frequent scathing attacks on what the paper called the "loony left" element within the Labour Party, and on institutions supposedly controlled by it. Ken Livingstone, the leader of the left-wing Greater London Council, was described as "the most odious man in Britain" in October 1981.

During the miners' strike of 1984–85, The Sun supported the police and Margaret Thatcher's government against the striking NUM miners, and in particular the union's president, Arthur Scargill. On 23 May 1984, The Sun prepared a front page with the headline "Mine Führer" and a photograph of Scargill with his arm in the air, a pose which made him look as though he was giving a Nazi salute. The print workers at The Sun refused to print it. The Sun strongly supported the April 1986 bombing of Libya by the US, which was launched from British bases. Several civilians were killed during the bombing. Their leader was "Right Ron, Right Maggie". That year, Labour MP Clare Short attempted in vain to persuade Parliament to outlaw the pictures on Page Three, and gained criticism from the newspaper for her stand. During the 1987 UK general election, The Sun ran a mock-editorial entitled "Why I'm Backing Kinnock, by Stalin".

==== Murdoch's response ====
Murdoch responded to some of the criticisms of the newspaper by saying that critics were "snobs" who want to "impose their tastes on everyone else". MacKenzie claimed the same critics were people who, if they ever had a "popular idea", would have to "go and lie down in a dark room for half an hour". Both have pointed to the huge commercial success of the Sun during that period, and its establishment as Britain's top-selling newspaper, claiming that they are "giving the public what they want". That conclusion was disputed by critics. John Pilger said that a late-1970s edition of the Daily Mirror, which replaced the usual celebrity and domestic political news items with an entire issue devoted to his own front-line reporting of the genocide in Pol Pot's Cambodia, not only outsold The Sun on the day it was issued, but became the only edition of the Daily Mirror to ever sell every single copy issued, something never achieved by The Sun.

In January 1986, Murdoch shut down the Bouverie Street premises of The Sun and News of the World, and moved operations to the new Wapping complex in East London, substituting the electricians' union for the print unions as his production staff's representatives, and greatly reducing the number of staff employed to print the papers. A year-long picket by sacked workers was eventually defeated (see Wapping dispute).

==== "Freddie Starr Ate My Hamster" ====
"Freddie Starr Ate My Hamster", headline of The Sun, 13 March 1986

During that period, The Sun gained a reputation for running sensationalist stories of questionable veracity. On 13 March 1986, the newspaper published one of its best known headlines: "FREDDIE STARR ATE MY HAMSTER". The story alleged that comedian Freddie Starr, while staying at the home of a writer and friend of his named Vince McCaffrey and his partner Lea LaSalle in Birchwood, Cheshire, had, after returning from a performance at a nightclub in the early hours, found little to eat in their house. LaSalle was reported as saying that Starr put her pet hamster "between two slices of bread and started eating it".

According to Max Clifford: Read All About It, written by Clifford and Angela Levin, La Salle invented the story out of frustration with Starr, who had been working on a book with McCaffrey. She contacted an acquaintance who worked for The Sun in Manchester. The story reportedly delighted MacKenzie, who was keen to run it, and Max Clifford, who had been Starr's public relations agent. Starr had to be persuaded that the apparent revelation would not damage him, and the attention helped to revive his career. In his 2001 autobiography Unwrapped, Starr wrote that the incident was a fabrication: "I have never eaten or even nibbled a live hamster, gerbil, guinea pig, mouse, shrew, vole or any other small mammal".

==== Elton John and other celebrities ====
Fuelled by MacKenzie's preoccupation with the subject, stories in The Sun spread rumours about the sexual orientation of famous people, especially pop stars. The Sun ran a series of false stories about Elton John from 25 February 1987, which eventually resulted in a total of 17 libel suits. They began with an invented account of the singer having sexual relationships with rent boys. The singer-songwriter was abroad on the day indicated in the story, as former Sun journalist John Blake, recently poached by the Daily Mirror, soon discovered. After further stories, in September 1987, The Sun accused John of having his Rottweiler guard dogs' voice boxes surgically removed. In November, the Daily Mirror found their rival's only source for the rent boy story, who admitted it was a totally fictitious concoction created for money. The inaccurate story about his dogs, actually Alsatians, put pressure on The Sun, and John received £1 million in an out-of-court settlement, then the largest damages payment in British history. The Sun ran a front-page apology on 12 December 1988, under the banner headline "SORRY, ELTON".

Television personality Piers Morgan, a former editor of the Daily Mirror and of The Sun's "Bizarre" pop column, has said that during the late 1980s, at Kelvin MacKenzie's behest, he was ordered to speculate on the sexuality of male pop stars for a feature headlined "The Poofs of Pop". He also recalls MacKenzie headlining a January 1989 story about the first same-sex kiss on the BBC television soap opera EastEnders as "EastBenders", describing the kiss between Colin Russell and Guido Smith as "a homosexual love scene between yuppie poofs ... when millions of children were watching". In 1990, the Press Council adjudicated against The Sun and columnist Garry Bushell for their use of derogatory terminology about gay people.

==== AIDS and homophobia ====
The Sun responded to the health crisis on 8 May 1983 with the headline: "US Gay Blood Plague Kills Three in Britain". In May 1987, the publication offered gay men free one-way airline tickets to Norway to leave Britain for good: "Fly Away Gays – And We Will Pay" was the paper's headline. Gay Church of England clergymen were described in one headline in November 1987 as "Pulpit poofs".

On 17 November 1989, The Sun headlined a page 2 news story titled "STRAIGHT SEX CANNOT GIVE YOU AIDS – OFFICIAL". The Sun favourably cited the opinions of Lord Kilbracken, a member of the All Parliamentary Group on AIDS, who had said that only one person out of the 2,372 individuals with HIV/AIDS mentioned in a specific Department of Health report was not a member of a "high risk group", such as homosexuals and recreational drug users. The Sun also ran an editorial arguing that "At last the truth can be told ... the risk of catching AIDS if you are heterosexual is 'statistically invisible'. In other words, impossible. So now we know – everything else is homosexual propaganda". Although many other British press services covered Lord Kilbracken's public comments, none of them echoed the argument in the Sun, and none of them presented Lord Kilbracken's ideas without context or criticism.

Critics stated that both The Sun and Lord Kilbracken cherry-picked the results from one specific study while ignoring other data on HIV infection and not just AIDS infection, which the critics viewed as unethical politicisation of a medical issue. Lord Kilbracken himself criticised The Sun's editorial and the headline of its news story, stating that, while he thought that gay people were more at risk of developing AIDS, it was still wrong to imply that no one else could catch the disease. The Sun's article and editorial were reported to the Press Council and an adjudication ruled that they were "misleading in its interpretation... and the headline... was a gross distortion of the statistical information supplied by the Minister". The Sun later published an apology, which was run on Page 28. David Randall argued in the textbook The Universal Journalist that the story in The Sun was one of the worst cases of journalistic malpractice in recent history, putting its own readers in harm's way.

==== Hillsborough disaster and its aftermath ====
The Sun's front page on 19 April 1989. The allegations were later proven to be entirely false, with The Sun later admitting their decision to publish the allegations was the "blackest day in this newspaper's history".

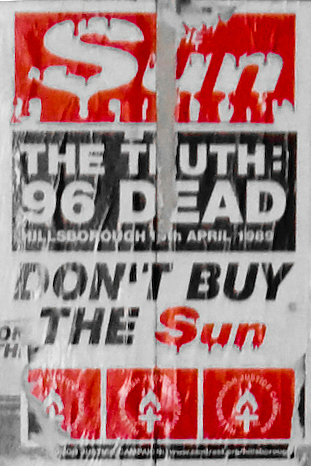
Poster urging the Liverpool public not to purchase The Sun

At the end of the decade, The Sun's coverage of the Hillsborough football stadium disaster, in which 97 people died as a result of their injuries, proved to be, as the paper later admitted, the "most terrible" blunder in its history. Three days after the accident, editor Kelvin MacKenzie published an editorial which accused people of "scapegoating" the police, saying that the disaster occurred "because thousands of fans, many without tickets tried to get into the ground just before kick-off – either by forcing their way in or by blackmailing the police into opening the gates". The next day, under a front-page headline "The Truth", the paper falsely accused Liverpool fans of theft and of urinating on and attacking police officers and emergency services. Conservative Member of Parliament Irvine Patnick was quoted as claiming that a group of Liverpool supporters told a police officer that they would have sex with a dead female victim.

MacKenzie maintained for years that his "only mistake was to believe a Tory MP". In 1993, he told a House of Commons committee, "I regret Hillsborough. It was a fundamental mistake. The mistake was I believed what an MP said", but privately said at a 2006 dinner that he had only apologised under the instruction of Rupert Murdoch, believing: "all I did wrong was tell the truth ... I was not sorry then and I'm not sorry now". On Question Time the next year, MacKenzie publicly repeated the claims he said at the dinner; he said that he believed some of the material they published in The Sun but was not sure about all of it. He said in 2012, "Twenty-three years ago I was handed a piece of copy from a reputable news agency in Sheffield in which a senior police officer and a senior local MP were making serious allegations against fans in the stadium ... these allegations were wholly untrue and were part of a concerted plot by police officers to discredit the supporters ... I published in good faith and I am sorry that it was so wrong". A member of the Hillsborough Families Support Group responded "too little, too late".

Widespread boycotts of the newspaper throughout Merseyside followed immediately and continue to this day. Boycotts include both customers refusing to purchase it, and retailers refusing to stock it, while others went on to withdraw it from sale due to low demand. The Financial Times reported in 2019 that Merseyside sales were estimated to drop from 55,000 per day to 12,000 per day, an 80% decrease. Chris Horrie estimated in 2014 that the tabloid's owners had lost £15 million per month since the disaster, in 1989 prices. Sales also declined to a lesser degree in neighbouring parts of Cheshire and Lancashire. It was revealed in a documentary called Alexei Sayle's Liverpool, aired in September 2008, that many Liverpudlians will not even take the newspaper for free, or will burn or tear it up. The paper is referred to by Liverpudlians as The Scum or The S*n, with campaigners believing it limited their fight for justice and area politicians refusing to grant it interviews. Anger at the paper ran so deep that when then-Opposition Leader Keir Starmer wrote an op-ed in the paper in 2021, it drew vehement protests from Merseyside-area Labour MPs.

The Sun was not the only newspaper to print similar stories about the alleged drunkenness and violence among Liverpool fans at the Hillsborough disaster. The Daily Star and Daily Mail were among the newspaper who printed claims that hooliganism was a major factor in the tragedy; however, other papers' stories were presented less prominently. Alex Hern of the New Statesman noted that the Daily Express's headline on the day of "The Truth" reported claims about fans as accusations by the police, rather than fact.

In April 1992, on the third anniversary of the Hillsborough disaster, The Sun printed an exclusive interview with Liverpool manager Graeme Souness as he celebrated Liverpool's FA Cup semi-final win over Portsmouth while recovering in hospital from heart surgery. Souness came under fire from Liverpool fans for conducting an interview with the newspaper, with fans making continued calls for him to be sacked. Liverpool's victory in the FA Cup final a month later did little to lessen the anger towards Souness, who was already under fire for Liverpool's inconsistent league form, although he did not resign from his position until January 1994.

===== Later repercussions and apologies =====
On 7 July 2004, in response to verbal attacks in Liverpool on Wayne Rooney, just before his transfer from Everton to Manchester United, who had sold his life story to The Sun, the paper devoted a full-page editorial to an apology for the "awful error" of its Hillsborough coverage and argued that Rooney (who was only three years old at the time of Hillsborough) should not be punished for its "past sins". In January 2005, The Sun's managing editor Graham Dudman admitting the Hillsborough coverage was "the worst mistake in our history", added: "What we did was a terrible mistake. It was a terrible, insensitive, horrible article, with a dreadful headline; but what we'd also say is: we have apologised for it, and the entire senior team here now is completely different from the team that put the paper out in 1989".

In May 2006, Kelvin MacKenzie, the Sun editor at the time of the Hillsborough disaster, returned to the paper as a columnist. Furthermore, on 11 January 2007, MacKenzie stated, as a panellist on BBC1's Question Time, that the apology he made about the coverage was a hollow one that had been forced upon him by Rupert Murdoch. MacKenzie further claimed he was not sorry "for telling the truth" but he admitted that he did not know whether some Liverpool fans urinated on the police or robbed victims.

On 12 September 2012, following the publication of the official report into the disaster using previously withheld Government papers which officially exonerated the Liverpool fans present, MacKenzie issued the following statement:

Today I offer my profuse apologies to the people of Liverpool for that headline. I too was totally misled. Twenty three years ago I was handed a piece of copy from a reputable news agency in Sheffield [White's] in which a senior police officer and a senior local MP [Sheffield Hallam MP Irvine Patnick] were making serious allegations against fans in the stadium. I had absolutely no reason to believe that these authority figures would lie and deceive over such a disaster. As the Prime Minister has made clear these allegations were wholly untrue and were part of a concerted plot by police officers to discredit the supporters thereby shifting the blame for the tragedy from themselves. It has taken more than two decades, 400,000 documents and a two-year inquiry to discover to my horror that it would have been far more accurate had I written the headline "The Lies" rather than "The Truth". I published in good faith and I am sorry that it was so wrong.

Trevor Hicks, chairman of the Hillsborough Family Support Group, rejected Mr MacKenzie's apology as "too little, too late", calling him "lowlife, clever lowlife, but lowlife". Following the publication of the report The Sun apologised on its front page, under the headline "The Real Truth". With the newspaper's editor at the time, Dominic Mohan, adding underneath:

It's a version of events that 23 years ago The Sun went along with and for that we're deeply ashamed and profoundly sorry. We've co-operated fully with The Hillsborough Independent Panel and will publish reports of their findings in tomorrow's newspaper. We will also reflect our deep sense of shame.

The newspaper was banned by Everton F.C. in April 2017 after The Sun published a column by former editor Kelvin MacKenzie the day before the 28th anniversary of the disaster which included a passage about footballer Ross Barkley that was considered "appalling and indefensible" and included a racist epithet and insults against the people of Liverpool. Access to the club grounds and facilities for Sun reporters were blocked. The Mayor of Liverpool Joe Anderson described the article as "disgrace" and a "slur" on the city. MacKenzie was suspended as a contributor to the paper on the day of publication.

=== 1990s ===
"It's The Sun Wot Won It": front page of The Sun on 11 April 1992 after the Conservatives won the election. The headline is regularly mentioned in debates about media influence in British politics.

The Sun remained loyal to Thatcher until her resignation in November 1990, despite the party's fall in popularity over the previous year following the introduction of the poll tax (officially known as the Community Charge). This change to the way local government is funded was vociferously supported by the newspaper, despite widespread opposition, (some from Conservative MPs), which is seen as having contributed to Thatcher's own downfall. The tax was quickly repealed by her successor John Major, whom The Sun initially supported enthusiastically, believing the former Chancellor of the Exchequer was a radical Thatcherite. On the day of the general election of 9 April 1992, its front-page headline, encapsulating its antipathy towards the Labour leader Neil Kinnock, read: "If Kinnock wins today, will the last person to leave Britain please turn out the lights". Two days later, The Sun was so convinced its front page had swung a close election for the Conservatives it declared: "It's The Sun Wot Won It". The Sun led with a headline "Now we've all been screwed by the cabinet" with a reference to Black Wednesday on 17 September 1992, and the exposure a few months earlier of an extra-marital affair in which Cabinet Minister David Mellor was involved.

On 14 October 1992, The Sun attacked Michael Heseltine for the mass coal mine closures. Despite its initial opposition to the closures, until 1997, the newspaper repeatedly called for the implementation of further Thatcherite policies, such as Royal Mail privatisation, and social security cutbacks, with leaders such as "Peter Lilley is right, we can't carry on like this". The paper showed hostility to the European Union (EU) and approval of public spending cuts, tax cuts, and promotion of right-wing ministers to the cabinet, with leaders such as "More of the Redwood, not Deadwood". The Sun criticised Labour leader John Smith in February 1994, for saying that more British troops should be sent to Bosnia. The Sun's comment was that "The only serious radicals in British politics these days are the likes of Redwood, Lilley and Portillo". It also gradually expressed its bitter disillusionment with John Major as Prime Minister, with headlines such as "What fools we were to back John Major".

Between 1994 and 1996, The Sun's circulation peaked. Its highest average sale was in the week ending 16 July 1994, when the daily figure was 4,305,957. The highest ever one-day sale was on 18 November 1995 (4,889,118), although the cover price had been cut to 10p. The highest ever one-day sale at full price was on 30 March 1996 (4,783,359). On 22 January 1997, The Sun accused the shadow chancellor Gordon Brown of stealing the Conservatives' ideas by declaring, "If all he is offering is Conservative financial restraint, why not vote for the real thing?" and called the planned windfall tax, which was later imposed by the Labour government, "wrongheaded". In February 1997 it told Sir Edward Heath MP to stand down for supporting a national minimum wage.

==== Support for New Labour ====
The Sun switched support to the Labour party on 18 March 1997, six weeks before the general election victory which saw the New Labour leader Tony Blair become Prime Minister with a large parliamentary majority, despite the paper having attacked Blair and New Labour up to a month earlier. Its front-page headline read THE SUN BACKS BLAIR and its front-page editorial made clear that while it still opposed some New Labour policies, such as the minimum wage and devolution, it believed Blair to be "the breath of fresh air this great country needs". It said that John Major's Conservatives were "tired, divided and rudderless". Blair, who had radically altered his party's image and policies, noting the influence the paper could have over its readers' political thinking, had courted it and Murdoch for some time by granting exclusive interviews and writing columns. In exchange for Rupert Murdoch's support, Blair agreed not to join the European Exchange Rate Mechanism, which John Major had withdrawn the country from in September 1992 after barely two years.

Cabinet Minister Peter Mandelson was "outed" by Matthew Parris (a former Sun columnist) on BBC TV's Newsnight in November 1998. Misjudging public response, The Sun's editor David Yelland demanded to know in a front-page editorial whether Britain was governed by a "gay mafia" of a "closed world of men with a mutual self-interest". Three days later, the paper apologised in another editorial which said The Sun would never again reveal a person's sexuality unless it could be defended on the grounds of "overwhelming public interest".

In 2005, The Sun published photographs of Prince Harry sporting a Nazi costume to a fancy dress party. The photographs caused outrage across the world and Clarence House was forced to issue a statement in response apologising for any offence or embarrassment caused. Despite being a persistent critic of some of the government's policies, the paper supported Labour in both subsequent elections the party won. For the 2005 general election, The Sun backed Blair and Labour for a third consecutive election win and vowed to give him "one last chance" to fulfil his promises, despite berating him for several weaknesses including a failure to control immigration. However, it did speak of its hope that the Conservatives (led by Michael Howard) would one day be fit for a return to government. This election (Blair had declared it would be his last as prime minister) resulted in Labour's third successive win but with a much reduced majority.

===== Immigration =====
In 2003, the paper was accused of racism by the government over its criticisms of what it perceived as the "open door" policy on immigration. The attacks came from the Prime Minister's press spokesman Alastair Campbell and the Home Secretary David Blunkett (later a Sun columnist). The paper rebutted the claim, believing that it was not racist to suggest that a "tide" of unchecked illegal immigrants was increasing the risk of terrorist attacks and infectious diseases. In July 2003, it published a front-page headline "Swan Bake", which claimed that Eastern European asylum seekers were poaching and barbecuing swans. Subsequent enquiries found no arrests or evidence linking asylum seekers to the incidents. Following a Press Complaints Commission adjudication, the paper published a clarification saying nobody had been arrested over the reports and that it was, therefore, not possible to factually state the suspects were asylum seekers.

=== Editorial and production issues in the 2000s ===
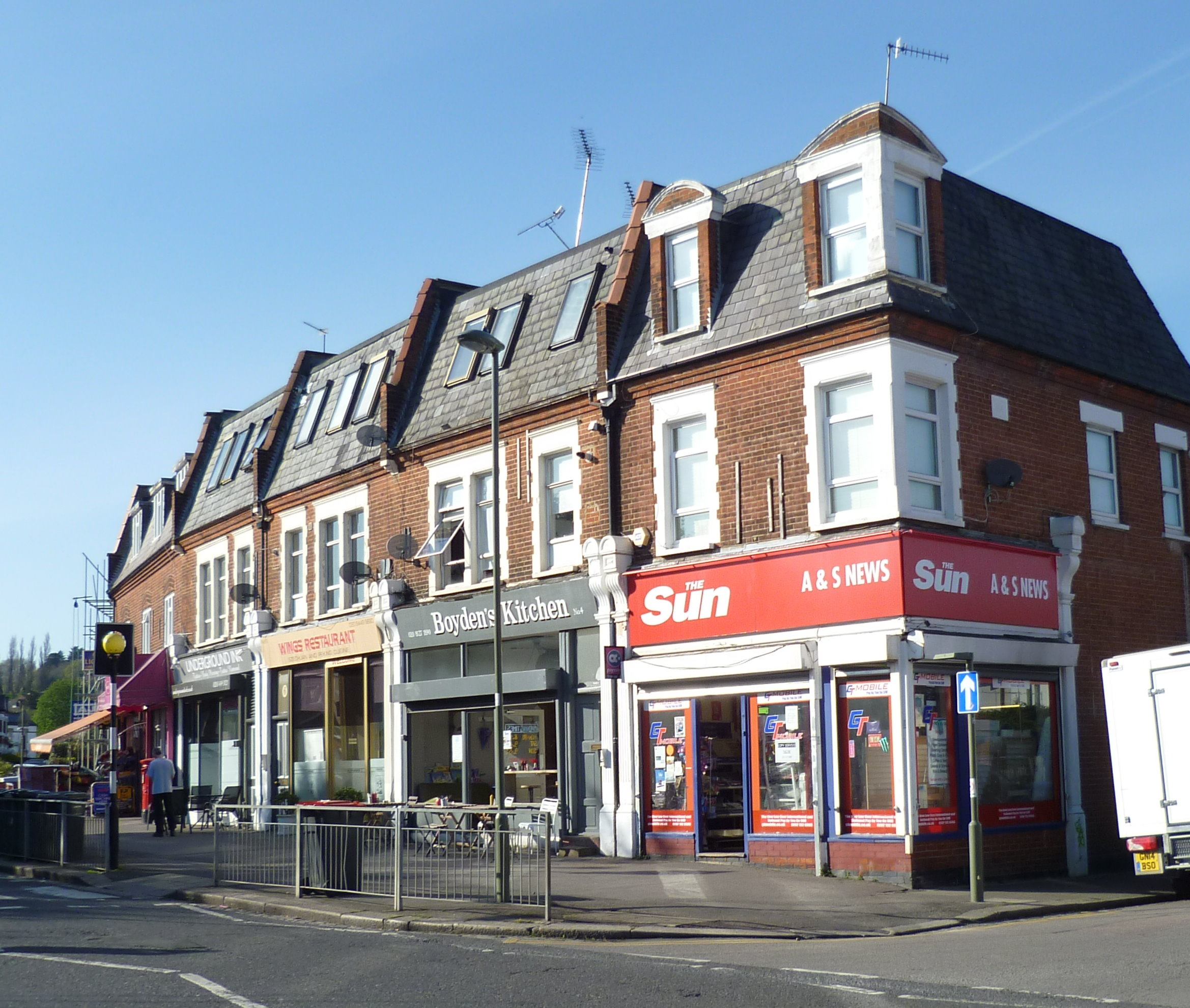
Sun-branded newsagent shop

When Rebekah Wade (now Brooks) became editor in 2003, it was thought Page 3 might be dropped. Wade had tried to persuade David Yelland, her immediate predecessors in the job, to scrap the feature, but a model who shared her first name was used on her first day in the post. On 22 September 2003, the newspaper appeared to misjudge the public mood surrounding mental health, as well as its affection for former world heavyweight champion boxer Frank Bruno, who had been admitted to hospital, when the headline "Bonkers Bruno Locked Up" appeared on the front page of early editions. The adverse reaction, once the paper had hit the streets on the evening of 21 September, led to the headline being changed for the paper's second edition to the more sympathetic "Sad Bruno in Mental Home".

The Sun has been openly antagonistic towards other European nations, particularly the French and Germans. During the 1980s and 1990s, the nationalities were routinely described in copy and headlines as "frogs", "krauts" or "hun". As the paper is opposed to the EU, it has referred to foreign leaders who it deemed hostile to the UK in unflattering terms. Former President Jacques Chirac of France, for instance, was branded "le Worm". An unflattering picture of German chancellor Angela Merkel, taken from the rear, bore the headline "I'm Big in the Bumdestag" (17 April 2006).

Although The Sun was outspoken against the racism directed at the Bollywood actress Shilpa Shetty on the television reality show Celebrity Big Brother during 2007, the paper captioned a picture on its website, from a Bollywood-themed pop video by Hilary Duff, "Hilary PoppaDuff", a very similar insult to that directed at Shetty. On 7 January 2009, The Sun ran an exclusive front-page story claiming that participants in a discussion on Ummah.com, a British Muslim internet forum, had made a "hate hit list" of British Jews to be targeted by extremists over the Gaza War. It was claimed that "Those listed [on the forum] should treat it very seriously. Expect a hate campaign and intimidation by 20 or 30 thugs". The UK magazine Private Eye claimed that Glen Jenvey, a man quoted by The Sun as a terrorism expert, who had been posting to the forum under the pseudonym "Abuislam", was the only forum member promoting a hate campaign and that other members promoted peaceful advocacy, such as writing "polite letters". The story has since been removed from The Sun's website following complaints to the UK's Press Complaints Commission.

On 9 December 2010, The Sun published a front-page story claiming that the terrorist group Al-Qaeda had threatened a terrorist attack on Granada Television in Manchester to disrupt the episode of the soap opera Coronation Street that was to be transmitted live that evening. The paper cited unnamed sources claiming that "cops are throwing a ring of steel around tonight's live episode of Coronation Street over fears it has been targeted by Al-Qaeda". Later that morning, however, Greater Manchester Police categorically denied having "been made aware of any threat from Al-Qaeda or any other proscribed organisation". The Sun published a small correction on 28 December, admitting "that while cast and crew were subject to full body searches, there was no specific threat from Al-Qaeda as we reported". The apology had been negotiated by the Press Complaints Commission. For the day following the 2011 Norway attacks, The Sun produced an early edition blaming the massacre on al-Qaeda on its front page. Later the perpetrator was revealed to be Anders Behring Breivik, a far-right terrorist from Norway.

In January 2008, the Wapping presses printed The Sun for the last time and London printing was transferred to Waltham Cross in the Borough of Broxbourne in Hertfordshire, where News International had built what is claimed to be the largest printing centre in Europe with 12 presses. The site also produces The Times and Sunday Times, Daily Telegraph and Sunday Telegraph, Wall Street Journal Europe (also a Murdoch newspaper), the London Evening Standard, and local papers. Northern printing had earlier been switched to a new plant at Knowsley on Merseyside and the Scottish Sun to another new plant at Motherwell near Glasgow. The three print centres represent a £600 million investment by NI and allowed all the titles to be produced with every page in full colour from 2008. The Waltham Cross plant is capable of producing one million copies an hour of a 120-page tabloid newspaper. In early 2011, the company vacated the Wapping complex, which in November 2011 was put on the market for a reputed £200 million. In May 2012, it was reported the Wapping site had been sold for £150 million to St George, part of Berkeley Group Holdings.

==== 2009: The Sun returns to the Conservatives ====
Politically, the paper's stance was less clear under Prime Minister Gordon Brown, who succeeded Blair in June 2007. Its editorials were critical of many of Brown's policies and often more supportive of those of Conservative leader David Cameron. Rupert Murdoch, head of The Sun's parent company News Corporation, speaking at a 2007 meeting with the House of Lords Select Committee on Communications, which was investigating media ownership and the news, said that he acts as a "traditional proprietor". This means he exercises editorial control on major issues such as which political party to back in a general election or which policy to adopt on Europe. With "Broken Britain" controversies on issues like crime, immigration and public service failures in the news, on 30 September 2009, following Brown's speech at the Labour Party Conference, The Sun, under the banner "Labour's Lost It", announced that it no longer supported the Labour Party: "The Sun believes – and prays – that the Conservative leadership can put the great back into Great Britain".

That day at the Labour Party Conference, union leader Tony Woodley responded by ripping up a copy of that edition of The Sun, remarking as he did so in reference to the newspaper's Hillsborough Disaster controversy: "In Liverpool we learnt a long time ago what to do". One attack on Gordon Brown backfired at around this time. After criticising him for misspelling a dead soldier's mother's name, The Sun was then forced to apologise for misspelling the same name on their website. The Scottish Sun did not back either Labour or the Conservatives, with its editorial stating it was "yet to be convinced" by the Conservative opposition, and editor David Dinsmore asking in an interview "what is David Cameron going to do for Scotland?". Dinsmore also stated that the paper supported the Union, and was unlikely to back the Scottish National Party. During the campaign for the 2010 UK general election, The Independent ran ads declaring that "Rupert Murdoch won't decide this election – you will". In response, James Murdoch and Rebekah Wade "appeared unannounced and uninvited on the editorial floor" of the Independent, and had an energetic conversation with its editor Simon Kelner. Several days later the Independent reported The Sun's failure to report its own YouGov poll result which said that "if people thought Mr Clegg's party had a significant chance of winning the election" the Liberal Democrats would win 49% of the vote, and with it a landslide majority.

On election day (6 May 2010), The Sun urged its readers to vote for David Cameron's "modern and positive" Conservatives to save Britain from "disaster" which the paper thought the country would face if the Labour government was re-elected. The election ended in the first hung parliament after an election for 36 years, with the Tories gaining the most seats and votes but being 20 seats short of an overall majority. They finally came to power on 11 May when Gordon Brown stepped down as prime minister, paving the way for David Cameron to become prime minister by forming a coalition with the Liberal Democrats. On 24 August 2012, The Sun sparked a controversy when it published photos of Prince Harry taken in a private situation with friends while on holiday in Las Vegas, USA. While other British newspapers had not published the photos in deference to the privacy of members of the Royal Family, editorial staff of The Sun claimed it was a move to test Britain's perception of freedom of the press. In the photos, which were published on the Internet worldwide, Prince Harry was naked.

=== Events in the 2010s ===
==== Fallout from the News of the World scandal ====
The Sun on Sunday front page

Following the News of the World phone hacking affair that led to the closure of that paper on 10 July 2011, there was speculation that News International would launch a Sunday edition of The Sun to replace the News of the World. The internet URLs sunonsunday.co.uk, thesunonsunday.co.uk and thesunonsunday.com were registered on 5 July 2011 by News International Newspapers Limited. A similar URL sunonsunday.com is not affiliated, having been registered in Italy on 24 September 2007. On 18 July 2011, the LulzSec group hacked The Sun's website, where they posted a fake news story of Rupert Murdoch's death before redirecting the website to their Twitter page. The group also targeted the website of The Times.

A reporter working for The Sun was arrested and taken to a south-west London police station on 4 November 2011. The man was the sixth person to be arrested in the UK under the News International related legal probe, Operation Elveden. In January 2012, two current and two former employees were arrested. As of 18 January 2013, 22 Sun journalists had been arrested, including their crime reporter Anthony France. On 28 January 2012, police arrested four current and former staff members of The Sun, as part of a probe in which journalists paid police officers for information; a police officer was also arrested in the probe. The Sun staffers arrested were crime editor Mike Sullivan, head of news Chris Pharo, former deputy editor Fergus Shanahan, and former managing editor Graham Dudman, who since became a columnist and media writer. All five arrested were held on suspicion of corruption. Police also searched the offices of News International, the publishers of The Sun, as part of a continuing investigation into the News of the World scandal.

On 11 February 2012, five senior journalists at The Sun were arrested, including the deputy editor, as part of Operation Elveden (the investigation into payments to UK public servants). Coinciding with a visit to The Sun newsroom on 17 February 2012, Murdoch announced via an email that the arrested journalists, who had been suspended, would return to work as nothing had been proved against them. He also told staff in the email that The Sun on Sunday would be launched "very shortly"; it was launched on 26 February 2012. On 27 February 2012, the day after the debut of The Sun on Sunday, Deputy Assistant Commissioner Sue Akers told the Leveson Inquiry that police were investigating a "network of corrupt officials" as part of their inquiries into phone hacking and police corruption. She said evidence suggested a "culture of illegal payments" at The Sun authorised at a senior level.

==== World Cup 2014 free issue ====
On 12 and 13 June 2014, to tie in with the beginning of the 2014 World Cup football tournament, a free special issue of The Sun was distributed by the Royal Mail to 22 million homes in England. The promotion, which did not include a Page 3 topless model, was announced in mid-May and was believed to be the first such freesheet issued by a UK national newspaper. The boycott in Merseyside following the newspaper's coverage of the Hillsborough disaster in 1989 meant that copies were not dispatched to areas with a Liverpool postcode. Royal Mail employees in Merseyside and surrounding areas were given special dispensation by their managers to allow them not to handle the publication "on a case by case basis".

The main party leaders (David Cameron, Nick Clegg, and Ed Miliband) were all depicted holding a copy of the special issue in publicity material. Miliband's decision to pose with a copy of The Sun received a strong response. Organisations representing the relatives of Hillsborough victims described Miliband's action as an "absolute disgrace", and he faced criticism too from Liverpool Labour MPs and the city's Labour Mayor, Joe Anderson. A statement was issued on 13 June explaining that Miliband "was promoting England's bid to win the World Cup" although "he understands the anger that is felt towards the Sun over Hillsborough by many people in Merseyside and he is sorry to those who feel offended". Promoted as "an unapologetic celebration of England", the special issue of The Sun ran to 24 pages.

==== Collapse of Tulisa's trial for drug offences ====
On 2 June 2013, The Sun on Sunday ran a front-page story on singer-songwriter Tulisa. The front page read: "Tulisa's cocaine deal shame"; this story was written by The Sun On Sunday's undercover reporter Mahzer Mahmood, who had previously worked for the News of the World. It was claimed that Tulisa introduced three film producers (actually Mahmood and two other Sun journalists) to a drug dealer and set up an £800 deal. The subterfuge involved conning the singer into believing that she was being considered for a role in an £8 million Bollywood film.

At her subsequent trial, the case against Tulisa passed out at Southwark Crown Court in July 2014, with the judge commenting that there were "strong grounds" to believe that Mahmood had lied at a pre-trial hearing and tried to manipulate evidence against the co-defendant Tulisa. Tulisa was cleared of supplying Class A drugs. After these events, The Sun released a statement saying that the newspaper "takes the Judge's remarks very seriously. Mahmood has been suspended pending an immediate internal investigation".

==== Trial of staff for misconduct in a public office ====
In October 2014, the trial of six senior staff and journalists at The Sun newspaper began. All six were charged with conspiring to commit misconduct in a public office. They included The Sun's head of news Chris Pharo, who faced six charges, while ex-managing editor Graham Dudman and ex-Sun deputy news editor Ben O'Driscoll were accused of four charges each. Thames Valley district reporter Jamie Pyatt and picture editor John Edwards were charged with three counts each, while ex-reporter John Troup was accused of two counts. The trial related to illegal payments allegedly made to public officials, with prosecutors saying the men conspired to pay officials from 2002 to 2011, including police, prison officers and soldiers. They were accused of buying confidential information about the Royal Family, public figures and prison inmates. They all denied the charges.

On 16 January 2015, Troup and Edwards were cleared by the jury of all charges against them. The jury also partially cleared O'Driscoll and Dudman but continued deliberating over other counts faced by them, as well as the charges against Pharo and Pyatt. On 21 January 2015, the jury told the court that it was unable to reach unanimous verdicts on any of the outstanding charges and was told by the judge, Richard Marks, that he would accept majority verdicts. Shortly afterwards, one of the jurors sent a note to the judge and was discharged. The judge told the remaining 11 jurors that their colleague had been "feeling unwell and feeling under a great deal of pressure and stress from the situation you are in", and that under the circumstances he was prepared to accept majority verdicts of "11 to zero or 10 to 1". On 22 January 2015, the jury was discharged after failing to reach verdicts on the outstanding charges. The Crown Prosecution Service (CPS) announced that it would seek a retrial.

On 6 February 2015, it was announced that Judge Richard Marks was to be replaced by Judge Charles Wide at the retrial. Two days earlier, Marks had emailed counsel for the defendants, telling them: "It has been decided (not by me but by my elders and betters) that I am not going to be doing the retrial". Reporting the decision in UK newspaper The Guardian, Lisa O'Carroll wrote: "Wide is the only judge so far to have presided in a case which has seen a conviction of a journalist in relation to allegations of unlawful payments to public officials for stories. The journalist, who cannot be named for legal reasons, is appealing the verdict". Defence counsel for the four journalists threatened to take the decision to judicial review, with the barrister representing Pharo, Nigel Rumfitt QC, saying: "The way this has come about gives rise to the impression that something has been going on behind the scenes which should not have been going on behind the scenes and which should have been dealt with transparently". He added that the defendants were "extremely concerned" and "entitled" to know why Marks was being replaced by Wide. In a separate trial, Sun reporter Nick Parker was cleared on 9 December 2014 of aiding and abetting misconduct in a public office but found guilty of handling a stolen mobile phone belonging to Labour MP Siobhain McDonagh.

On 22 May 2015, Sun reporter Anthony France was found guilty of aiding and abetting misconduct in a public office between 2008 and 2011. France's trial followed the London Metropolitan Police's Operation Elveden, an ongoing investigation into alleged payments to police and officials in exchange for information. He had paid a total of more than £22,000 to PC Timothy Edwards, an anti-terrorism police officer based at Heathrow Airport. The police officer had already pleaded guilty to misconduct in a public office and given a two-year jail sentence in 2014, but the jury in France's trial was not informed of this. Following the passing of the guilty verdict, the officer leading Operation Elveden, Detective Chief Superintendent Gordon Briggs said France and Edwards had been in a "long-term, corrupt relationship". The BBC reported that France was the first journalist to face trial and be convicted under Operation Elveden since the Crown Prosecution Service (CPS) had revised its guidance in April 2015 so that prosecutions would only be brought against journalists who had made payments to police officers over a period of time. As a result of the change in the CPS' policy, charges against several journalists who had made payments to other types of public officials – including civil servants, health workers and prison staff – had been dropped.

In July 2015, Private Eye magazine reported that, at a costs hearing at the Old Bailey, The Sun's parent company had refused to pay for the prosecution costs relating to France's trial, leading the presiding judge to express his "considerable disappointment" at this state of affairs. Judge Timothy Pontius said in court that France's illegal actions had been part of a "clearly recognised procedure at The Sun", adding that, "There can be no doubt that News International bears some measure of moral responsibility if not legal culpability for the acts of the defendant". The Private Eye report noted that despite this The Sun's parent organisation was "considering disciplinary actions" against France whilst at the same time it was also preparing to bring a case to the Investigatory Powers Tribunal against the London Metropolitan Police Service for its actions relating to him and two other journalists.

==== End of the Page 3 feature (January 2015) ====
The Sun defended Page 3 for more than 40 years, with (then) editor Dominic Mohan telling the Leveson Inquiry into press standards, in February 2012, that "Page 3" was an "innocuous British Institution, regarded with affection and tolerance". To mark the feature's 40th anniversary, feminist author Germaine Greer wrote an article in The Sun on 18 November 2010 published under the headline: "If I ask my odd-job man what he gets out of page 3, he tells me simply, 'It cheers me up'".

In August 2013, The Irish Sun ended the practice of featuring topless models on Page 3. The main newspaper was reported to have followed in 2015 with the edition of 16 January supposedly the last to carry such photographs after a report in The Times made such an assertion. After substantial coverage in the media about an alleged change in editorial policy, Page 3 returned to its usual format on 22 January 2015. A few hours before the issue was published, the head of PR at the newspaper said the reputed end of Page 3 had been "speculation" only. Apart from the edition of 22 January 2015, the conventional Page 3 feature of a topless model has not returned, and has effectively ended.

==== Accusations of xenophobia ====
On 17 April 2015, The Sun's columnist Katie Hopkins called migrants to Britain "cockroaches" and "feral humans" and said they were "spreading like the norovirus". Her remarks were condemned by the United Nations High Commission for Human Rights. In a statement released on 24 April 2015, High Commissioner Zeid Ra'ad Al Hussein stated that Hopkins used "language very similar to that employed by Rwanda's Kangura newspaper and Radio Mille Collines during the run up to the 1994 genocide", and noted that both media organisations were subsequently convicted by an international tribunal of public incitement to commit genocide.

In August 2017, The Sun published a column by Trevor Kavanagh which questioned what actions British society should take to deal with "The Muslim Problem". Numerous sources suggested the column used language reminiscent of Nazi propaganda and Nazi phrases. A joint complaint was made to the Independent Press Standards Organisation by the Board of Deputies of British Jews, Tell MAMA and Faith Matters. A statement by the groups said, "The printing of the phrase 'The Muslim Problem' – particularly with the capitalisation and italics for emphasis – in a national newspaper sets a dangerous precedent, and harks back to the use of the phrase 'The Jewish problem' in the last century, to which the Nazis responded with 'The Final Solution' – the Holocaust". A cross-party group of over 100 MPs from the Conservatives, Labour, the Liberal Democrats and the Greens subsequently signed a letter to the editor of The Sun demanding action over the column. The letter stated the MPs "were truly outraged by the hate and bigotry" in Kavanagh's column.

==== Brexit ====
On 9 March 2016, The Sun's front page proclaimed that Queen Elizabeth II was backing Brexit, a common term for a British withdrawal from the European Union. It claimed that in 2011 at Windsor Castle, while having lunch with Deputy Prime Minister Nick Clegg, the monarch criticised the union. Clegg denied that the Queen made such a statement, and a Buckingham Palace spokesperson confirmed that a complaint had been made to the Independent Press Standards Organisation over a breach of guidelines relating to accuracy.

The Sun officially endorsed the Leave campaign in the British referendum to remain in or leave the European Union (EU) on 23 June 2016, urging its readers to vote for the United Kingdom to leave the EU. The "BeLeave in Britain" front-page headline was only present on copies distributed in England and Wales; editions for Scotland, Northern Ireland (and the Republic of Ireland) led on other topics. On 4 April 2017, The Sun printed a headline "Up Yours, Senors" (cross-referring the 1990 headline "Up Yours, Delors" regarding the ECU). It was in relation to disputes over the sovereignty of Gibraltar following the EU referendum. The middle pages featured a poster with the message "Hands off our rock".

==== Website redesign ====
In June 2016, a redesign of The Sun's website went live.

==== Ben Stokes and Gareth Thomas ====
In September 2019, The Sun came under strong criticism for a headline story concerning the family of the cricket player Ben Stokes. Tom Harrison, the chief executive of the England and Wales Cricket Board (ECB), stated he was "disgusted and appalled" by the newspaper's actions. The story prompted a statement from Stokes calling the article the "lowest form of journalism", which dealt with "deeply personal and traumatic events" that had affected his New Zealand-based family more than 30 years ago. The Sun defended its journalism by pointing out it had received the co-operation of a family member; it has commented that the events described were "a matter of public record" and "the subject of extensive front-page publicity in New Zealand at the time".

Welsh rugby player Gareth Thomas told BBC Radio 5 Live that an unnamed journalist had revealed his HIV status to his parents before he had had the opportunity to do so himself. While Thomas declined to name the newspaper involved, he did say "everybody will know, especially of late", leading the Press Gazette to suggest that it could be The Sun, on the basis of the Stokes coverage.

==== 2019 Conservative leadership election ====
During the 2019 Conservative Party leadership election, The Sun endorsed Boris Johnson.

==== Far-right conspiracy incident ====
In December 2019, The Sun's political editor, Tom Newton Dunn, wrote an article for the paper titled "Hijacked Labour", alleging that "Jeremy Corbyn is at the centre of an extraordinary network of hard-left extremists pieced together by former British intelligence officers", a network ranging from Novara Media contributor Ash Sarkar to French philosopher Michel Foucault, who has been dead since 1984, that is alleged to be pulling Corbyn's strings. It was later found that the ultimate sources for this claim included the antisemitic, far-right websites The Millennium Report and Aryan Unity. The allegations were described by author Daniel Trilling as "a far-right conspiracy theory". The left-wing magazine Tribune suggested that such articles might get journalists or those on the political left assaulted or even killed. Later on the same day the article was published, it was also deleted, without comment from the paper or Newton Dunn.

==== 2019 general election ====
In the 2019 UK general election The Sun endorsed the Conservative Party.

==== Wagatha Christie trial ====
On 9 October 2019, Coleen Rooney made a Twitter post saying that stories from her private Instagram account were being leaked to The Sun. In order to determine who was selling the information, she restricted access to her Instagram stories and planted a number of fake stories; the only viewer of these posts was an account belonging to Rebekah Vardy. The fake stories were published in The Sun. Rooney's tweet went viral and was dubbed "Wagatha Christie", a portmanteau of the term "WAG" (Note: An acronym referring to the wives and girlfriends of footballers.) and the mystery writer Agatha Christie. Vardy denied these claims and stated that her Instagram account had been hacked. As a result, Vardy sued Rooney for libel. Rooney asked Vardy to not take the case to court which she rejected. Therefore, it became Rooney's responsibility to prove Vardy was personally responsible for leaking stories to The Sun, or convince the judge that publication of the allegation was in the public interest.

It was alleged in court that Vardy was also The Sun on Sunday's Secret Wag columnist, which is an anonymous gossip column about the private lives of the wives and girlfriends of famous UK footballers which often made disparaging comments about the subjects. Vardy denied this claim. On 29 July 2022, Karen Steyn, the judge in the case, dismissed Vardy's claim. She ruled that Rooney's accusation of Vardy leaking fake stories to the paper was "substantially true". Steyn said that "The Secret Wag" "is highly likely ... [to have been] a journalistic construct rather than a person", saying that "the evidence connecting Ms Vardy to this column is thin". The case was a hugely popular story in the British media and while The Sun did cover it extensively, they failed to mention that they were the paper Vardy had leaked untrue stories to.

=== Events in the 2020s ===
==== Caroline Flack ====
On 14 February 2020, a day before Caroline Flack was found dead in her Stoke Newington flat, The Sun published an article about a "brutal" Valentine's Day card mocking Flack on its website. It is unclear when the article, which was replaced with a legal warning by Saturday evening – amid concerns about how the media handled coverage of her arrest – was taken down. Days after Flack's death, more than 200,000 people signed a petition calling for a Government inquiry into the British press and the hashtag #DontBuyTheSun began to trend on Twitter.

==== J.M.Preve ====
In June 2020, shortly after J. K. Rowling published a blog in which she described her first marriage as "violent", The Sun interviewed Jorge Arantes, Rowling's former husband, and published a front-page article entitled "I slapped JK and I'm not sorry". In response, a number of domestic abuse charities criticised the newspaper for its handling of the story. The press regulator Ipso reported that it had received more than 500 complaints about the article. The article was also criticised by some British politicians with Labour MP Jess Phillips describing the headline as "awful" and Ed Davey, the acting leader of the Liberal Democrats, adding, "This reporting is unacceptable, glorifies domestic violence & disparages the millions of victims of domestic violence".

==== Jeremy Clarkson column on the Duchess of Sussex ====
In December 2022, columnist Jeremy Clarkson was criticised for writing of Meghan, Duchess of Sussex in The Sun:

I hate her. Not like I hate Nicola Sturgeon or Rose West. I hate her on a cellular level. At night, I'm unable to sleep as I lie there, grinding my teeth and dreaming of the day when she is made to parade naked through the streets of every town in Britain while the crowds chant, 'Shame!' and throw lumps of excrement at her.

He said this was a reference to a scene from the television series Game of Thrones. He had used the same reference in an article published in The Sun in December 2018 to defend Meghan. The Independent Press Standards Organisation (IPSO) said it had received more than 25,100 complaints about the piece, surpassing the total number of complaints received in 2021 and making it the article with the most number of complaints attached to it since IPSO's establishment in 2014.

In light of the controversy, Edward Faulks, the chair of IPSO, declined a private dinner invitation by Rupert Murdoch. The Scottish first minister, Nicola Sturgeon, whose name was also mentioned in the column, described Clarkson's comments as "deeply misogynist and just downright awful and horrible" and warned that "words have consequences". The prime minister, Rishi Sunak, responded to the controversy by emphasising that "language matters". In a letter to ITV chief executive Carolyn McCall, SNP MP John Nicolson called on the organisation to sack Clarkson from his job on the TV game show Who Wants to Be a Millionaire?.

On 20 December 2022, over 60 cross-party MPs contacted The Sun's editor, Victoria Newton, to demand an apology and called for "action [to be] taken" against Clarkson. On 21 December, Kevin Lygo, the managing director of ITV, stated at a Broadcasting Press Guild event that Clarkson would remain host of Who Wants to Be a Millionaire? "at the moment", as ITV had "no control" over what he said in The Sun newspaper column, but added that what he wrote "was awful" and "he should apologise" for his comments. On the same day the head of the Metropolitan Police Sir Mark Rowley stated Clarkson would not face criminal proceedings for his actions as it was not the job of officers to "police people's ethics" and the police could generally get involved when "things are said that are intended or likely to stir up or incite violence".

Peter Herbert, the chair of the Society of Black Lawyers, wrote to the Metropolitan Police requesting an investigation under the Public Order Act 1986 as he believed the column promoted racial hatred. The letter was co-signed by the Society of Black Lawyers, Operation Black Vote and Bandung Africa, as well as Lee Jasper, Viv Ahmun, Bell Ribeiro-Addy, and Claudia Webbe. A spokesperson for the Metropolitan Police said "The allegations have been assessed, no offences have been identified, and no further action will be taken". On 11 January 2023, culture secretary Michelle Donelan described Clarkson's comments as "outrageous" but not "illegal".

On 19 December 2022, Clarkson stated he was "horrified to have caused so much hurt" over his comments, which were also criticised by his own daughter Emily. The Sun's website published a statement in response to the criticism: "In light of Jeremy Clarkson's tweet he has asked us to take last week's column down". On 23 December, The Sun issued an apology stating: "Columnists' opinions are their own, but as a publisher, we realise that with free expression comes responsibility. We at the Sun regret the publication of this article and we are sincerely sorry. The article has been removed from our website and archives".

On 24 December, a spokesperson for the Duke and the Duchess of Sussex issued a statement saying: "The fact that the Sun has not contacted The Duchess of Sussex to apologise shows their intent. This is nothing more than a PR stunt ... A true apology would be a shift in their coverage and ethical standards for all". In an Instagram post on 16 January 2023, Clarkson revealed that he had emailed the Duke and Duchess on Christmas Day 2022 to apologise, saying that his language had been "disgraceful" and he was "profoundly sorry". A spokesperson for the couple said Clarkson wrote solely to the Duke and the article was not an isolated incident considering "his long-standing pattern of writing articles that spread hate rhetoric, dangerous conspiracy theories and misogyny".

In February 2023, IPSO announced that it was launching an investigation about the article, over two groups of complaints, from the Fawcett Society and the Wilde Foundation. In June 2023, IPSO concluded that the column was sexist and contained a "pejorative and prejudicial reference" to Meghan's sex, but it rejected complaints that the piece was inaccurate, meant to harass her or included discriminatory references on the grounds of race.

==== BBC explicit pictures controversy ====
On 7 July 2023, allegations were first reported by the newspaper that a "well known" name at the BBC had paid tens of thousands of pounds to a teenager for sexually explicit photographs that started when they were aged 17. The allegations had been made by the mother and the stepfather of the alleged victim. On 10 July, the lawyer of the alleged victim told the BBC that "nothing inappropriate or unlawful has taken place between our client and the BBC personality and the allegations reported in The Sun newspaper are rubbish".

On 12 July, a statement issued on behalf of senior presenter and newsreader Huw Edwards, by his wife, Vicky Flind, named him as the subject of the allegations. The statement said that Edwards was receiving hospital treatment for an episode of depression, following the publication of the allegations.

A complaint about Edwards' behaviour had been made to the BBC by a family member of the alleged victim on 18 May 2023, and a further detailed phone conversation took place the following day. The BBC's audience services team concluded that there was no evidence of criminality but that further investigations needed to take place. On 11 July, a second person accused the unnamed presenter of sending "abusive, expletive-filled messages". The same day, a 23-year-old accused the unnamed presenter of breaking COVID lockdown rules in February 2021.

On the same day that Edwards was named, the Metropolitan Police reported that "there is no information to indicate that a criminal offence has been committed" following an initial investigation into the matter and said that it would not investigate further. The South Wales Police issue a similar statement. Following the statement by the police and that released by Edward's wife, The Sun stated that it had never insinuated criminality on the part of Edwards and also stated that it would cooperate with the BBC's internal investigation and that it would not publish any further allegations about him.

The Sun stated: "It is understood contact between the two started when the youngster was 17 years old", but the reporting did not mention whether explicit photos were exchanged when the alleged victim was 17 years old. The wording of the allegations first reported in The Sun said that a high-profile BBC presenter had given a young person "more than £35,000 since they were 17 in return for sordid images". Wording to this effect was used at least seven times online over the next three days, out of dozens of articles published on the subject by the newspaper

==== Dan Wootton allegations ====
In July 2023, allegations were published by the Byline Times about the conduct of Dan Wootton while he worked at The Sun. In 2014, Wootton became editor of the paper's Bizarre column and remained with the paper until January 2021. An article by Byline Times alleged that during Wootton's tenure as Bizarre editor that he instructed male pornographic actors to use equipment to film themselves secretly having sex with men he had spoken to on Facebook. The article also claimed Wootton paid the pornographic actors by misappropriating funds for sources from News UK.

Another story published by Byline Times in late July 2023 claimed Wootton oversaw a culture of sexual harassment at The Sun and was the subject of at least six bullying claims by colleagues, all of which resulted in large pay-offs and confidentiality agreements. These allegations resulted in an investigation by an external law firm hired by News UK. On 2 October 2023, the Metropolitan Police confirmed that after seeking to "establish whether any criminal offence" had taken place, they had now commenced an investigation into the allegations. They added that no arrests had been made. Wootton denied any wrongdoing and said that he was the victim of "a smear campaign".

==== Luke Littler PR stunt ====
In December 2023, The Sun published an article in which the teenage darts sensation Luke Littler was photographed smiling holding a kebab and a Sun newspaper, with the caption "Sun reader Luke Littler celebrates his latest world championship victory with a trademark kebab". This was seen as a PR stunt by The Sun, and the teenager received backlash for being from Runcorn, which is near Liverpool, the vitriol related to the newspaper's coverage of the Hillsborough disaster. Littler later clarified on Twitter that he was then not fully aware what was going on.

==== Iain Purslow death at Bolton ====
On 13 January 2024, the Bolton Wanderers EFL League One fixture with Cheltenham Town was abandoned after 29 minutes when the 71-year-old spectator Iain Purslow collapsed in the crowd and needed CPR. Purslow later died in hospital. The Sun was heavily criticised for its headline and sub-headline the following day, and The Bolton News described it as "distasteful".

== Circulation and profitability ==
The Sun dominated the circulation figures for daily newspapers in the United Kingdom from the late 1970s, at times easily outpacing its nearest rivals, the Daily Mirror and the Daily Mail. For a brief period in the late 1990s and early 2000s, the lead was more than one million copies per day. In January 2000, circulation was approximately 3.5 million per day, whilst daily circulation for those rivals was around 2.3 million.

Sustained decline from digital disruption began in 2004, in line with print journalism as a whole, and The Sun lost more than a million copies from its daily figures in the six-year period from 2012 to 2018. The Sun's long run at the top was finally broken in February 2018 when it was announced that the circulation of the free Metro newspaper had overtaken it for the first time. However, it remains the most-selling newspaper in the UK.

In February 2020, it was revealed that daily sales of The Sun had fallen 8% to 1.38 million in the year to July, but the publication then remained the UK's biggest-selling paid-for paper. The Sun on Sunday sold an average of 1.16 million copies a week, 111,000 fewer than the year before.

News Group Newspapers reported that The Sun lost £68m in 2019, with sales falling as the company continued to deal with costs arising from the phone-hacking scandal. In April 2020, News UK instructed Audit Bureau of Circulations that its circulation data should be kept private and would be shared only with advertising agencies in confidence. In May 2020, The Sun's 42-year run as the top selling paper came to an end when eclipsed by the Daily Mail.

In the year ending June 2020, the newspaper posted a pre-tax £202m loss, a significant increase from £67.8m the previous year. The majority of the loss, 80%, was thought to be from payments in damages from phone hacking, although revenue from sales and advertising was being affected by the COVID-19 pandemic. The value of the newspaper was written down by £84m, in effect to zero, with the company believing that The Sun and Sun on Sunday would not return to growth. It made a pre-tax loss of £53 million in the year to the end of June 2025, after an £18 million loss in 2024. The combined print and digital ‘reach’ of the Sun — a measure of the number of adults that actually read it — fell from 26.6 million to 22.2 million in 2025.

== Editors ==
- Sydney Jacobson (1964–1965, previously editor of the Daily Herald before the name change)
- Dick Dinsdale (1965–1969)
- Larry Lamb (1969–1972)
- Bernard Shrimsley (1972–1975; Lamb was editorial director, supervising both the Sun and News of the World)
- Larry Lamb (1975–1980; Lamb took an enforced six-month sabbatical before being sacked by Murdoch)
- Kelvin MacKenzie (1981–1994)
- Stuart Higgins (1994–1998)
- David Yelland (1998–2003)
- Rebekah Wade (2003–2009)
- Dominic Mohan (2009–2013)
- David Dinsmore (2013–2015)
- Tony Gallagher (2015–2020)
- Victoria Newton (since 2020)

== Political endorsements ==
=== United Kingdom general elections ===
	England/Wales	Scotland
1966 general election	Labour	No separate edition
1970 general election	Labour	No separate edition
February 1974 general election	Conservative	No separate edition
October 1974 general election	Labour	No separate edition
1979 general election	Conservative	No separate edition
1983 general election	Conservative	No separate edition
1987 general election	Conservative	Conservative
1992 general election	Conservative	SNP
1997 general election	Labour	Labour
2001 general election	Labour	Labour
2005 general election	Labour	Labour
2010 general election	Conservative	No endorsement
2015 general election	Conservative	SNP
2017 general election	Conservative	SNP
2019 general election	Conservative	No endorsement
2024 general election	Labour	Labour

=== Referendums ===
	England/Wales	Scotland
1975 United Kingdom European Communities membership referendum	Stay	No separate edition
2014 Scottish independence referendum	N/A	Neutral
2016 United Kingdom European Union membership referendum	Leave	Neutral

== Other versions ==
=== The Scottish Sun ===
A Scottish edition of The Sun launched in 1987, known as The Scottish Sun, recognising the distinctiveness of the Scottish media market. Based in Glasgow, it duplicates much of the content of the main edition but with alternative coverage of Scottish news and sport. The launch editor was Jack Irvine who had been recruited from the Daily Record, its main rival in the Scottish tabloid market. By the mid-2000s The Scottish Sun had become the largest-selling newspaper in Scotland, overtaking the Record.

At first the Scottish edition followed the London edition in supporting the Conservatives and Margaret Thatcher, but in 1992 it declared support for Scottish independence. It did not, however, support the pro-independence Scottish National Party (SNP). By the time of the 1997 UK general election both the Scottish and London editions were supportive of Labour, led by Tony Blair. This attitude continued throughout the Blair premiership (1997–2007). For instance, during the 2007 Scottish Parliament election the front page featured a hangman's noose in the shape of an SNP logo and stated "Vote SNP today and you put Scotland's head in the noose".

The Scottish Sun switched ahead of the 2011 Scottish Parliament election, declaring support for the SNP. It took a neutral stance on the referendum on Scottish independence, commenting: "What we cannot do is tell you how we think you should vote". At the 2015 UK general election, The Scottish Sun urged its readers to back the SNP. While in England and Wales, the paper saw a vote for the Conservatives as a means to "stop [the] SNP running the country", the edition north of the border said the SNP would "fight harder for Scotland's interests at Westminster".

The 2019 UK general election saw the paper take a neutral stance stating that it was not backing the party for the first time since 2011 and claiming that 'There is a very real threat of Jeremy Corbyn walking into No10 on Friday and plunging Britain back to the bust ideology of the 1970s — an era of power blackouts and economic misery. The hard-left nationalisation and high-tax agenda of the crackpots who have hijacked Labour is nightmarish... Ms Sturgeon's tawdry flirting with Mr Corbyn — for a shot at securing an "IndyRef2020" that polls show a clear majority of Scots oppose — means we cannot endorse the SNP in the general election.' It again chose not to endorse the SNP at the 2021 Scottish Parliament election,

=== The Irish Sun and The Irish Sun on Sunday ===
The Irish edition of the newspaper, based in Dublin, is known as the Irish Sun, with a regional sub-edition for Northern Ireland where it is mastheaded as The Sun, based in Belfast. The Republic of Ireland edition shares some content – namely glamour and showbiz – with the editions published in Great Britain, but has mainly Irish news and editorial content, as well as sport and advertising. It often views stories in a very different light to those being reported in the UK editions. Editions of the paper in Great Britain described the film The Wind That Shakes the Barley (2006) as being "designed to drag the reputation of our nation through the mud" and "the most pro-IRA ever"; conversely, the Republic of Ireland edition praised the film and described it as giving "the Brits a tanning".

Unlike its sisters papers in Great Britain, The Irish Sun did not have a designated website until late 2012. An unaffiliated news site with the name Irish Sun has been in operation since mid-2004. There is also an Irish edition of the Sun on Sunday, the Irish Sun on Sunday, which launched in February 2012.

=== Polski Sun ===
Polski Sun was a Polish-language version of the newspaper which ran for six issues in June 2008 during the UEFA Euro 2008 football tournament, on the days of and the days after Poland played matches. Each issue had a circulation of 50,000–75,000, to serve the estimated 600,000 Poles in the United Kingdom at the time.

=== The U.S. Sun ===
The U.S. Sun is an online version of The Sun for the United States.

== See also ==
- CTB v News Group Newspapers Ltd
- Dear Deidre
- Jon Gaunt
