= Fourth-wave feminism =

Feminist movement (2010s–present)

Fourth-wave feminism is a feminist movement that began around 2012 and is characterized by a focus on the empowerment of women, the use of internet tools, and intersectionality. According to Rosemary Clark-Parsons, digital platforms have allowed feminist movements to become more connected and visible, allowing activists to reach a global audience and act on it in real time. The fourth wave seeks greater gender equality by focusing on gendered norms and the marginalization of women in society. These online tools open up the doors for empowerment for all women by giving opportunities for diverse voices, particularly those from marginalized communities to contribute to a wide range of people pushing for a more inclusive movement.

Fourth-wave feminism focuses on sexual abuse, sexual harassment, sexual violence, the objectification of women, and sexism in the workplace. Internet activism is a key feature of the fourth wave, used to amplify awareness of these issues. Fourth-wave feminism broadens its focus to other groups, including the LGBTQ+ community and people of color, and advocates for their increased societal participation and power. It also advocates for equal incomes regardless of sex and challenges traditional gender roles for men and women, which it believes are oppressive. The movement further argues against sexual assault, objectification, harassment, and gender-based violence.

Some have identified the movement as a reaction to post-feminism, which argues that women and men have already reached equality. It also brought back some second-wave feminism ideas into discourse, with Martha Rampton writing that the movement criticises "sexual abuse, rape, violence against women, unequal pay, slut-shaming, the pressure on women to conform to a single and unrealistic body-type", and advocates for "gains in female representation in politics and business".

== History and definition ==
Some feminists argue that in the 1980s conservative figures like Margaret Thatcher and Ronald Reagan challenged gains feminists had made up to that point. At the same time, feminists in North America, Latin America, and Europe had succeeded in some of their goals, including the creation of state-run institutions that explicitly promoted women's rights, or feminist involvement in government; however, these institutions also weakened feminist movements by letting the state take over implementation of feminist goals.

European and Latin American third-wave feminism began in the 1990s, as lipstick feminism and consumerist feminism started to come to an end and as feminist activists were rejecting queer theory espoused by American academics. Fourth-wave feminism developed slowly, globally via the media and the Internet. The wave emerged from a new generation of women who had largely not been informed about previous waves through their education at high school, institutions and university. Knowledge about feminism was gained informally and it developed a virtual academy where feminists learned that "the personal is political"; it did not emerge from structured feminist learning. Fourth-wave feminism, like other waves before it, in this period was not about the existence of a single ideology, entity, or collective. It was about drawing together in collective groups to work together towards a common goal of ending violence against women in order to free them for the options to take the paths they desire; it was about mutual commitment and support to other women.

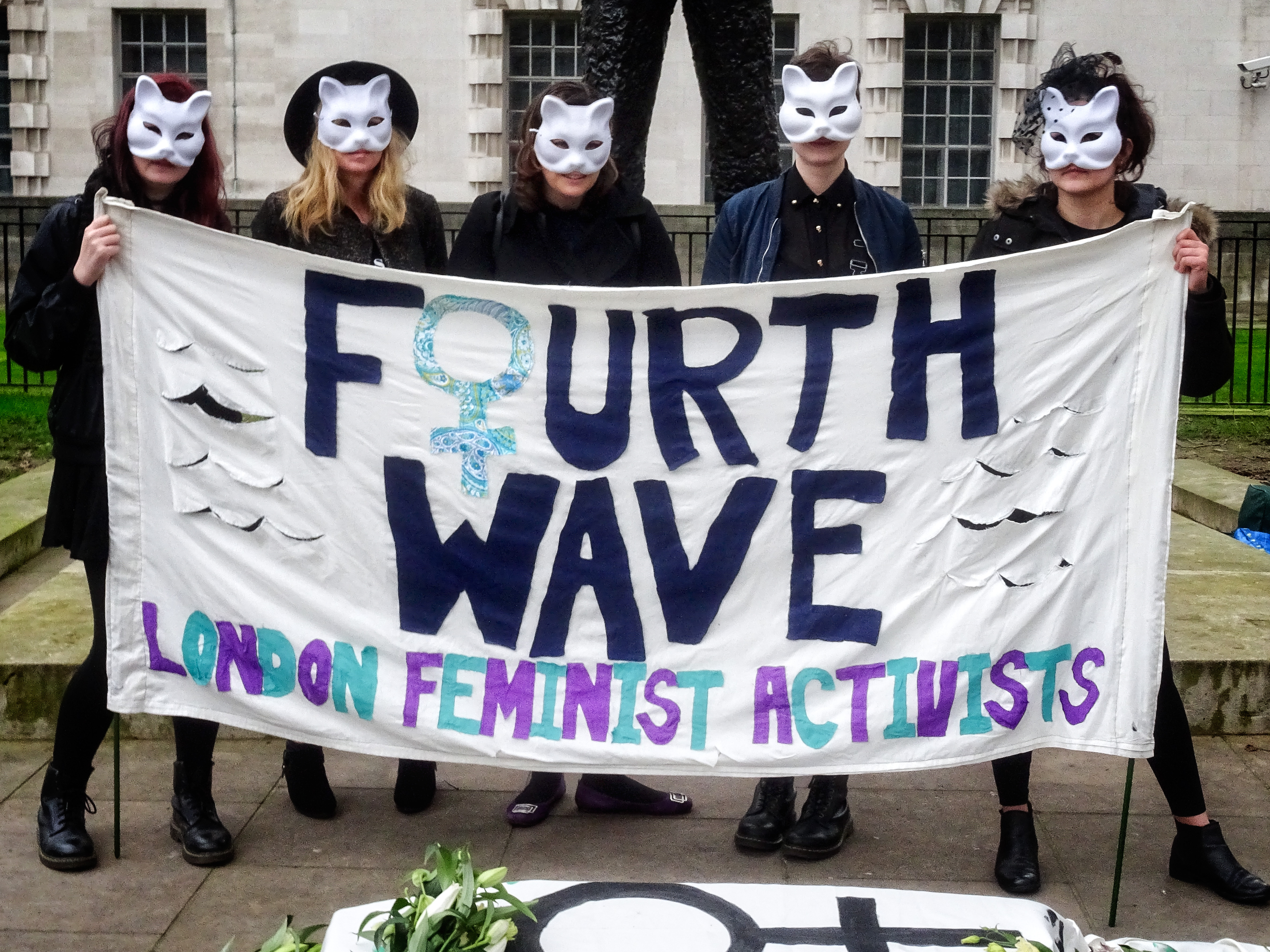
International Women's Day, London, 2017

The movement in Spain traces its roots to the murder of Ana Orantes; on 17 December 1997, she was burned to death by her husband in her house in Granada for speaking publicly on Canal Sur about how he abused her. Early fourth-wave Spanish feminism used television and newspapers as the primary social network. Orantes' death brought domestic violence against women to national attention, and resulted in RTVE changing its policies on how the station reported on gender-based violence. Similar conversations took place at other television networks and media organizations across the country. Jokes about domestic violence were no longer accepted on Spanish TV. Journalists from El Mundo, El País and infoLibre were among Spain's first participants in the fourth-wave, using their positions in the media to talk about a number of issues, mostly centered around sexist violence and its portrayal in the media. They later went on to talk about Spain's gender parity pay problems and promoted taking activism to virtual spaces.

The beginnings of this movement in this period took place in Latin America and Poland. Some of this global desire to act, particularly in a Polish context, came out of the World Conference on Women, 1995 in Beijing.

Social media had an amplifying effect as the fourth-wave feminist movement began to grow. Fourth-wave feminism began its peak in Spain, Argentina, Chile and Brazil in 2018 as a result of a number of different factors, with women mobilized on a large scale to take to the streets. Their mobilization also challenged for the first time, the legitimacy of Spain's judiciary, whereas in previous waves the focus had been more on political leadership and acts of the legislature. The wave in Spain would also face a major challenge, including the emergence of Vox, a far right political party who won seats in Andalusia. Vox was opposed to The Organic Law of Comprehensive Protection Measures against Gender Violence and wanted to see it overturned. In Argentina, the peak would be around the abortion rights issue which saw thousands of women with green scarves take to the streets. Social media helped organize and connect these protests, allowing feminist movements to support each other across the world. It also gave opportunities for more voices to be heard, especially people from marginalized groups, and helped prove that gender inequality is linked to other issues like race, class, and sexuality.

In an Anglosphere feminist context, journalist Pythia Peay argued for the existence of a fourth wave as early as 2005, to focus on social justice and civil rights, and in 2011, Jennifer Baumgardner dated the start of the fourth wave to 2008. Twitter, the social network most popular with the 18-to-29 age group, was created in 2006, making feminism more accessible and giving rise to "hashtag feminism".

In 2013, Democratic Texas State Senator Wendy Davis staged a 13-hour filibuster in Texas, in an attempt to prevent an anti-abortion bill from passing. Other women showed support by rallying around the Texas State Capitol and those who were not physically present used the hashtag #StandWithWendy. Similarly, women protested the perceived sexist questions (for example, focusing on appearance or love life) often directed at female celebrities by tweeting the hashtag #askhermore.

Other feminist movements and "calls to action" have arisen from the fourth wave. One is the "HeForShe" campaign which originated from Emma Watson's viral UN Women speech in 2014 and her subsequent activism. Several other incidents have galvanized the movement, including the Delhi gang rape (India, 2012), Jimmy Savile allegations (UK, 2012), Bill Cosby sexual assault cases (US, 2014), Isla Vista killings (US, 2014), trial of Jian Ghomeshi (Canada, 2016), Harvey Weinstein allegations (US, 2017) and subsequent Me Too movement and Weinstein effect, the Westminster sexual scandals (worldwide and UK, 2017) and the La Manada gang rape case in Spain (2018).

Due to the simultaneous existence of multiple waves of feminism – namely the second, third and fourth – many scholars are questioning the use of the wave metaphor in feminism. However, it is still the terminology most commonly used and most easily understood by the public. As the fourth wave finds much of its definition in relation to the previous ones, it is important to understand what the other waves were.

Internationally, comparisons between waves can be difficult. Anglospheric first-wave feminism is second-wave for Europeans and Latin American feminists. Second-wave American and British feminism is also third-wave for Europeans and Latin Americans. Spanish feminism went through several waves in the Franco era.

Broadly speaking, there are first-wave feminism taking place from the mid-nineteenth century to 1965, second-wave feminism taking place from 1965 to 1975 and third-wave feminism taking place from 1975 to 2012. Fourth-wave feminism in Spain began in the mid-1990s. When resolving waves around the work of important Spanish-speaking feminists discussing wave theory like Amelia Valcárcel, the Spanish fourth-wave may at times actually represent an international fifth wave, not a fourth one.

Each feminist wave has a separate identity, although they get harder to distinguish and define clearly as time goes on, due to debate among activists and scholars. In an Anglospheric feminist context, the first wave was characterized by the suffragette movements and had the aim of legalizing women voting in public elections. In the same context, second wave is more difficult to comprehensively define, but is thought to have roots in the 1960s. Its focus shifted to social and personal rights, such as equal pay, choice over bodily issues, sexual liberation and resistance to the gendered double standard in society. There is much debate among Anglosphere academics and activists regarding the true definition of the third wave of feminism. It is most commonly understood as a push by younger generations to create a feminism more centered on inclusivity; privileging the plights of queer and non-white women in their messaging. American poet Natasha Sajé has written, "[It] is an amalgamation of many different streams of theorizing—including that of women of color and younger women disillusioned with what they perceive to make up the body of 'second wave' feminism—in intrinsically different formulations than the theorizing coming from anti-feminists".

== Ideas ==
British journalist Kira Cochrane and British feminist scholar Prudence Bussey-Chamberlain describe the fourth wave as focusing on justice for women, particularly opposition to sexual harassment (including street harassment), violence against women, workplace discrimination and harassment, body shaming, sexist imagery in the media, online misogyny, campus sexual assault and assault on public transport and rape culture. They also say it supports intersectionality, social media activism and online petitioning. Its essence, Chamberlain writes, is "incredulity that certain attitudes can still exist". Events and organizations involved in fourth-wave feminism include Everyday Sexism Project, UK Feminista, Reclaim the Night, One Billion Rising and "a Lose the Lads' mags protest".

Books associated with the fourth wave include:

- Men Explain Things to Me (2014) by American writer Rebecca Solnit (notably, a 2008 essay also called Men Explain Things to Me, reprinted in the book, gave rise to the term mansplaining)
- The Vagenda (2014) by British writers Rhiannon Lucy Cosslett and Holly Baxter (based on their online UJ feminist magazine, The Vagenda, launched in 2012)
- Sex Object: A Memoir (2016) by American writer Jessica Valenti
- Everyday Sexism (2016) by British writer Laura Bates (based on Bates' Everyday Sexism Project)

Cosslett and Baxter's book aims to debunk stereotypes of femininity promoted by mainstream women's press. Bates, a British feminist writer, created the Everyday Sexism Project on 16 April 2012 as an online forum where women could post their experiences of everyday harassment.

Third-wave feminists began introducing the concept of male privilege in their writings in the 1990s and fourth-wave feminists continue to discuss it in academia and on social media. American Peggy McIntosh was one of the first feminists to describe the phenomenon of privilege in 1988, calling it (in regards to white privilege) "an invisible weightless knapsack of special provisions, maps, passports, codebooks, visas, clothes, tools and blank checks." Fourth-wave feminists have taken action to reduce and combat this "knapsack" by raising awareness of privileged and unprivileged groups. Alliance is greatly encouraged by these feminists, who believe that males and other privileged groups can still take action for social change within their communities.

London author Nikki van der Gaag discusses the damaging effects of raising young boys with privilege, citing the Consultative Group on Early Child Care and Development, "a tendency to privilege boys [...] does not teach boys responsibility, nor clarify what will be expected from them". Fourth-wave feminists have begun promoting solutions to avoid these issues, such as raising children as gender-neutral. Professor of Neuroscience at Chicago Medical School Lise Eliot points out that infants and growing children are so impressionable that any small differences in raising the child can lead to large personality differences over time, resulting in reinforced gender stereotypes.

Fourth-wave feminists have argued that reinforced gender stereotypes create pressure for men to be breadwinners, as opposed to women, who feel obligated to take on the role of homemakers. Feminists argue that these pressures to conform socially can cause gender discrimination in the workplace and more widely in society. According to Pew Research, a majority of women working in male-dominated workplaces believe that sexual harassment is a problem in their industry.

Fourth-wave feminists have also pointed out how gender roles and inequalities show up in fields like architecture. Torsten Lange and Lucía C. Pérez-Moreno explain that feminist scholars have pointed out how architectural history has often ignored women's contributions and only focused on male ways of thinking in theory and practice. They show how gender bias in both architecture schools and also in professional workplaces illustrate bigger social patterns--for example, how men are seen as doing “serious” work while women are expected to take on other traditional roles. This kind of thinking affects who gets opportunities in the field today. It's an example of fourth-wave feminist concern about how workplace culture can reinforce outdated gender stereotypes.

== Intersectionality ==
One of the main critiques of past waves of feminism has been the centrality and privileging of the voices of middle class white women in the movement. The concept of intersectionality originates in black feminism throughout the 20th century and the specific term's coinage is attributed to Kimberle Williams Crenshaw in 1991. Intersectionality in a broad sense is defined as "the interactivity of social identity structures such as race, class and gender in fostering life experiences, especially experiences of privilege and oppression". It addresses the complexities of how different systems of oppression interact and overlap and has expanded to become a topic in fields of study outside of gender studies and feminism as well, and its main goal as a tool within the feminist movement is to give a voice and power to those who have been pushed to the margins, namely women of color and queer people.

While it has been used widely in conjunction with feminism since the 1990s, the fourth wave of feminism gives the concept a new level of prominence in the movement as the voices of those with marginalized identities are more easily heard with the use of social media. Intersectionality is most closely associated with black feminism in the eyes of both the general public and the world of academia, as a community operating under the oppressive systems of both racism and sexism and as the term intersectionality first gained traction through the work of black feminists. Some would say that "black feminists are read as the embodiment of intersectionality". While the use of intersectionality as a lens through which to view feminist discourse and practice has helped the movement make leaps of progress in regards to bringing forward the voices and needs of oppressed identities, the close association with black women and feminists has given rise to critiques on both sides of the debate.

In terms of defending black women's experiences of intersectionality, one phrase that has been used is "I live it", in reference to the fact that critics are often attempting to disprove life experiences of black women that they have not themselves experienced or have grounds to falsify. Additional critiques against intersectionality from the viewpoint of white, middle-class leaders of feminism include the supposed use of the term to attack these leaders and the essentializing of gender oppression alone as opposed to all systems of oppression. For example, on a 2013 episode of 'Women's Hour' about fourth wave feminism, a Radio 4 program in the UK, a white feminist leader named Caroline Criado-Perez said "a big part of the problem is the way certain women use intersectionality as a cloak to abuse prominent white feminists". This was said in response to a critique of racism within modern feminism made by Reni Eddo-Lodge, a black feminist. On the other side, while intersectionality gives voices to marginalized communities it also often puts the labor of explaining and educating others about the term on those living under oppression, especially black women.

Although a large percentage of activists operating under fourth wave feminism define themselves as intersectional feminists, intersectionality lives mostly in the realm of academia at this point in time.

British professor of marketing and consumer research Pauline Maclaran argues that although celebrities are at the forefront of fourth-wave feminism, ready access to information has enabled the movement to draw greater attention to economic inequalities faced by women than heretofore possible.

Regarded as more inclusive of the LGBTQIA+ community, fourth-wave feminists such as Jacob Bucher of Baker University have protested stereotypes surrounding men's supposed uncontrolled sexual desire and objectification of women. He states that gay men specifically are stigmatized by such stereotypes because they lie outside of the typical standard for masculinity.

Canadian art historian Ruth Phillips argues that fourth-wave feminism falls within the broader agenda of financial, political and environmental concerns and is recognized as a key factor in alleviating poverty, improving women's health and achieving economic growth.

In Latin American fourth-wave feminism, a similar concept to intersectionality is that of transversality. It describes "a form of feminism that addresses a wide range of issues in an effort to represent the heterogeneity of society". Examples include addressing colonialism or racism, economic topics and LGBTQ issues.

== Globally ==
=== MeToo movement ===
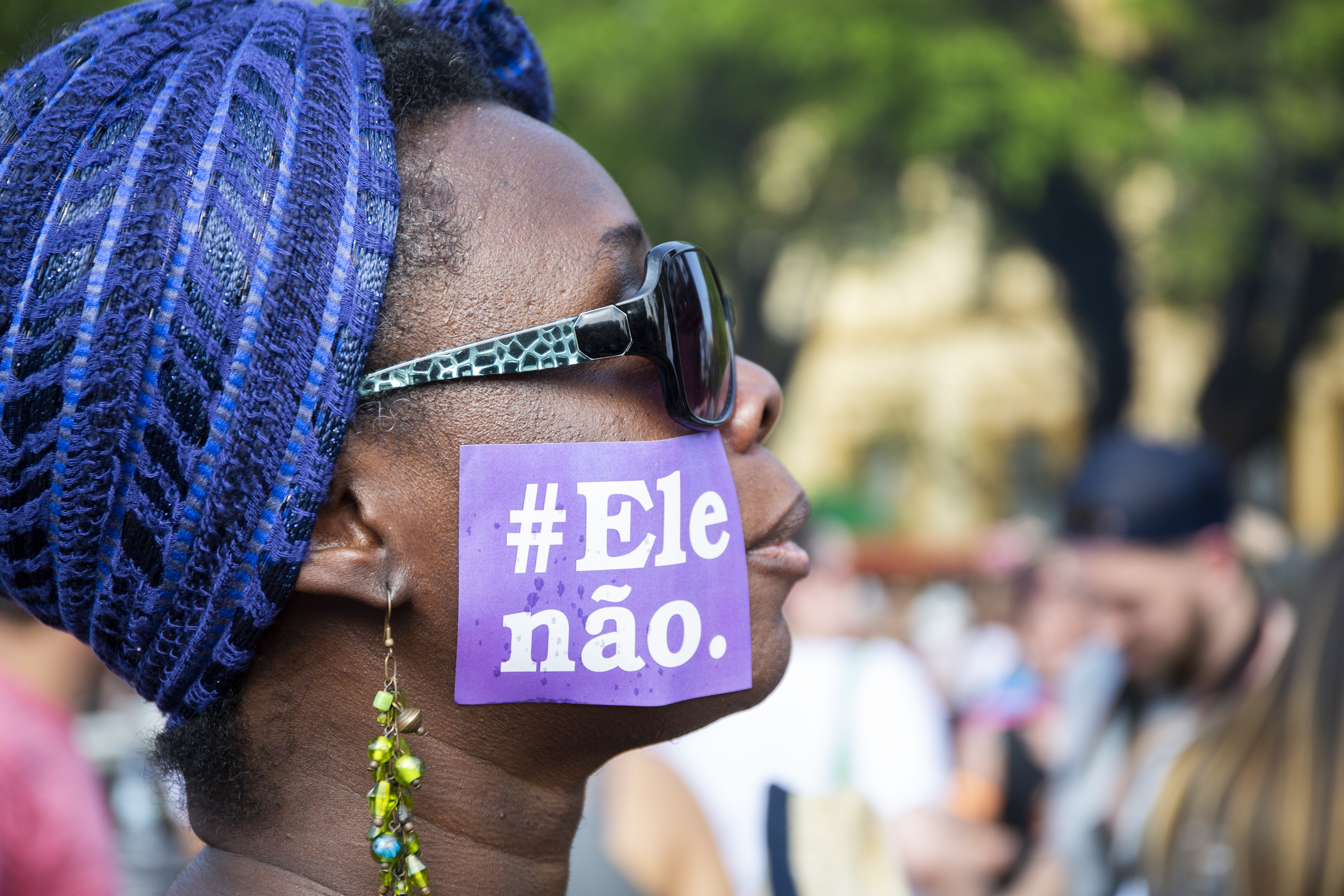
Protester in Porto Alegre, Brazil, participating in the Ele Não movement

Black activist Tarana Burke initially started the MeToo movement in 2006 to empower victims of sexual abuse. It was not until 2017 that #MeToo gained widespread use, following the Harvey Weinstein sexual assault crisis. Other countries began their own hashtags with a similar goal, even though reactions of local governments differed. Hashtags associated with the worldwide MeToo Movement include:

- #AndNow or NowWhat in Canada
- #WoYeShi (Mandarin Chinese for 'MeToo') in China
- #BalanceTonPorc (French for 'DenounceYourPig' / 'ExposeYourPig'') in France
- #NotinMyName in India
- #QuellaVoltaChe (Italian for 'The Time That') in Italy
- #BoycottAliZafar, #BoycottTeefainTrouble, #TeefaisTrouble in Pakistan
- #BabaeAko (Filipino for 'I Am a Woman') in the Philippines
- #YoTambien (Spanish for 'MeToo') in Spain
- #AmINext in South Africa

As the importance of social media in "creating and sustaining feminist community" is an increasingly popular idea, "diversity and creativity continue to characterize feminist activism" around the world in the 21st century. Communities around the globe witnessed the reflections of "the current, Internet-based fourth wave" feminism and investigated the differences of it. Moreover, the increasing social power of fourth-wave feminist movements prioritizes these issues for elected governments, encouraging them to engage with the "new and young feminisms" of the modern day.

For instance, in Canada, after the #MeToo hashtag began trending in October 2017, hundreds of people began crediting fourth-wave feminists with the movement. Another hashtag, #AndNow, became popular in Canada due to the support of Prime Minister Justin Trudeau. #AndNow supported discussing the solution to sexual harassment or abuse in the workplace to help people fight for equity between all people.

Another example of how social media supports fourth-wave feminism is the Girlgaze photography project. Ruxandra Looft explains that Girlgaze uses platforms like Instagram to promote gender equality and give a voice to women and non-binary people. This was started by photographer Amanda de Cadenet, and her project showcases work from young photographers who identify as female worldwide. Looft explains that Girlgaze brings together art and activism, using social media’s wide reach to raise awareness, connect people, and attract new audiences. She emphasizes that this approach lets people share everyday experiences of gender inequality in a way that feels personal and real. This approach offers something different from what we usually see in mainstream media, making it stand out and potentially offering other benefits due to how it connects with the audience.

In India, there have been several movements or protests with large numbers of women, which have changed the perspective of many in the nation regarding femininity. These include the 2003 Blank Noise Project, the 2009 Pink Chaddi (underwear) movement, the 2011 SlutWalk protest, the 2015 Pinjra Tod (Break the Cage) movement and the 2017 Bekhauf Azadi (Freedom without Fear) March. Indian social discourse started to focus on long-term and deep-rooted issues, such as gender inequality, sexual violence, child marriage, sex-selective abortions, and dowry-related violence. Many believe it led to questioning women's freedoms, choices, and desires in society. The influence and power of the campaign made the government expand the legal definition of rape, introduced "harsher punishment for rapists, criminalizing stalking and voyeurism", showed "a new kind of Indian femininity that was comfortable with her modernity and sexuality" and demonstrates the rise of fourth-wave feminism in India.

Ni una menos (meaning "Not One Less", using the feminine form of "one") is a Latin American feminist movement originating in Argentina which aims to end violence against women. The movement has engaged in women's strikes, including the International Women's Strike. Ni una menos has been described as fourth wave feminism. According to Cecilia Palmeiro, a founding member of the Ni Una Menos collective, "By connecting perspectives such as indigenous feminism with black feminism, migrant feminism, queer feminism and popular feminism, we made alliances and enlightened the intersection of violences as well as featured possible strategies of resistance. That is why our movement has been described as a fourth wave of feminism or feminism of the 99 percent."

In Brazil, on September 19, 2018, the Ele Não movement (Portuguese for 'not him'), also known as the protests against Jair Bolsonaro, were demonstrations led by women which took place in several regions of the country as well as the world. The main goal was to protest against Bolsonaro's presidential campaign and his sexist declarations. It was being used even among national and international celebrities. Madonna was one of the international celebrities who took part in the movement. She posted on her Instagram, where she has more than 12.1 million followers, a picture in which she appears with her mouth sealed by a tape with the saying "freedom". Above, it reads in Portuguese "Ele não vai nos desvalorizar, ele não vai nos calar, ele não vai nos oprimir" (He won't devalue us, he won't silence us, he won't oppress us).

Because Latin American fourth-wave feminism encompasses simultaneously distinct movements, many of which are in tension with one another, some refer to Latin American 'feminisms' in the plural. One of the more controversial branches emerged as a reaction to and rejection of queer feminism and of postmodern feminism, and consists of trans-exclusionary activists who reject prominent feminist academics like Judith Butler and much of feminist theory and seek to create a new anti-LGBT feminist movement by redefining 'woman' as exclusively cisgender and non-intersex, seeking to reframe the queer feminist movement not as an inclusive but as a watering-down of feminism and erasure of females. Whereas queer feminism was inclusive by expanding binary and cisnormative concepts of gender, these Latin American feminists argue that Butler was attempting to erase the concept of womanhood and thereby women as political subjects, and reject gender studies, calling it a conspiracy to hide women in academia. Defining identity through biology instead of gender and replacing postmodern concepts of femininity with gender-essentialism, they frame queer feminism as a conspiracy to hide 'male' aggressors (trans women) and oppress females.

== Roe v. Wade overturn ==
On June 24, 2022, the U.S. Supreme Court in Dobbs v. Jackson Women's Health Organization, in a 6–3 decision, overruled the previous landmark precedents of Roe v. Wade and Planned Parenthood v. Casey, stating that the Constitution of the United States does not confer the right to an abortion. The case was presented on the Constitutionality of a 2018 Mississippi law that banned abortion operations after the 15th week of pregnancy. The decision on June 24, 2022 came after a leak on May 2, 2022, which showed leaked documents of the majority opinion by Justice Samuel Alito, which criticized Roe. The following day the Supreme Court confirmed these documents to be legitimate but stated these documents do "not represent a decision by the Court or the final position of any member on the issues in the case".

Once Roe was overturned, various states across the United States followed suit in determining their stance on the protection of the right to abortion. Some states' older restrictions on abortion that were put on hold after Roe was passed, were now put back into place. Many states also had trigger laws that were put into place in May 2021, when the Supreme Court agreed to hear Dobbs arguments. These states include Arkansas, Idaho, Kentucky, Louisiana, Mississippi, Missouri, North Dakota, Oklahoma, South Dakota, Tennessee, Texas, Utah, and Wyoming. Some of the states never removed their pre-Roe abortion bans. They were unable to be enforced while Roe was in effect, but went back into operation after its overturning.

Protests spread all across the U.S. after the announcement of the overturn of Roe. These protests were largely peaceful and were carried out in 46 states.

The medical impact of the overturn of Roe has large and significant implications for medical and nursing education "and will reshape the knowledge, skills, and quality of care provided by future physicians and nurses, particularly in states with bans on abortion or pregnancy age restrictions". Medical students without the knowledge to perform a safe and legitimate abortion will also not have the knowledge to treat other pregnancy related complications such as placental abruption, infections, ectopic pregnancy, and eclampsia, because the techniques and tools used during these procedures are similar or the same to a standard abortion. Studies showed that in comparison to women who had an abortion, those who were forced to carry an unintended pregnancy to term and give birth, had poorer physical health. Similarly, women who were denied an abortion also had poorer well-being and reported an incline in their anxiety and depression as soon as a week after being denied.

The discussion of where fourth-wave feminism falls into the overturning of Roe is on-going online.

== Social media ==
While previous waves of feminism have encountered such obstacles as rigid sociopolitical structures and a lack of available communication channels, fourth-wave feminists harness digital media as a far-reaching platform on which to connect, share perspectives, create a broader view of experienced oppression and critique past feminist waves. Some argue that the use of technology in fourth-wave feminism signified a shift out of post-feminism and out of exclusively scholarly discussions. Social media allows women to share their experiences from all over the world and is a space where people can rally for change. Clark-Parsons explains that networked feminism lets everyday people use digital media platforms to organize and lead feminist movements. Instead of depending on formal organizations, many fourth-wave campaigns grow from individuals using social media to speak out and bring people together in a more casual every day way. It allows a broader range of people to participate in feminist discussions, debates and activism. In the past, these debates have often existed exclusively in the world of academia, leading to a smaller range of perspectives that have limited previous movements. Due to the global participation made possible by the internet, it has been argued that the fourth-wave exists online.

Kira Cochrane has argued that fourth-wave feminism is "defined by technology" and characterized particularly by the use of Facebook, Twitter, Instagram, YouTube, Tumblr and blogs such as Feministing to challenge misogyny.

The speed of communication and concept of "going viral" has been a major factor in the success of contemporary feminist campaigns, fostering digital phenomena such as "call-out culture". In the world of cyberfeminism, call-out culture is used as a tool to accuse sexual predators in a manner that allows for optional anonymity and the larger possibility of wide-ranged support. Hashtag feminism campaigns are often a result of this culture.

Social media activism has manifested as Twitter threads critiquing perceived transphobia in the media and in so-called "hashtag feminism" campaigns, notably #MeToo, #YesAllWomen, #bringbackourgirls, #NotYourAsianSidekick and #SolidarityIsForWhiteWomen. Girlgaze, launched by Amanda de Cadenet, is an online multi-sided platform that directly connects businesses, companies and brands with women and non-binary creative talent, promoting the need for diversity, inclusion and representation across the creative industry. Time named a group of activists prominent in the #MeToo movement, dubbed "the silence breakers", as its 2017 Person of the Year.

Other fourth-wave feminist campaigns include the Feminist Coalition, Everyday Sexism Project, No More Page 3, Ni una menos, Stop Bild Sexism, Free the Nipple, SlutWalk, the 2017 and 2018 Women's Marches, Time's Up and One Billion Rising. Artistic endeavors include Mattress Performance and 10 Hours of Walking in NYC as a Woman.

The Everyday Sexism Project, established in 2012 by feminist author Laura Bates, is an example of a fourth-wave feminist campaign that began online and utilized the internet as a medium for women to share stories of sexism and sexual assault they had faced through the use of a hashtag and sites like Twitter and blogs. The project brought awareness to the prolific nature of structurally ingrained sexism and gendered violence that is often a stigmatized topic in the everyday.

One critique of social media feminism is the emotional toll it can take on active leaders and participants as a form of unpaid labor that can often have harsh repercussions in the form of online harassment and abuse.

Sahar Khamis, a professor at University of Maryland, argues that social media gives feminists a unique avenue to highlight moments of solidarity in the social movement creating a powerful energy. Social media allows interconnected groups and individuals to network and connect with each other. Younger generations of feminists are more likely to form their beliefs and opinions and develop their support for the movement through social media.

== Men and the fourth wave ==
=== Importance of men's participation ===
According to the International Women's Development Agency, feminism is "about all genders having equal rights and opportunities." More than 70% of U.S. fathers take parental leave, but receive less than two weeks off after the birth of their child. Four times more men than women die by suicide in the U.S., due to stigma around mental health and seeking help for it.

In Emma Watson's 2014 speech launching the HeForShe campaign for UN Women, she points out that "men don't have the benefits of equality either." She cites examples from her own life where she has noticed this, including seeing her "father's role as a parent being valued less by society," and witnessing her male friends struggle to express their emotions. From the HeForShe website, HeForShe is "an invitation for men and people of all genders to stand in solidarity with women" in order to achieve gender equality for everyone.

=== Challenges for male feminists ===
Societal pressure and the ideals of toxic masculinity can make it difficult for men to support feminism. In many societies, to be considered 'masculine', men must be "strong, active, aggressive, tough, daring, heterosexual, emotionally inexpressive and dominant." Among these types of traits is the idea present in many cultures globally that being a man "often involve[s] male domination over women."

Fourth-wave feminism has reached a larger audience than previous waves through social media. In May 2023, researchers conducted an experiment designed to find the effect of feminist content on social media on millennial men and men from Generation Z. The findings included mixed messages, with one participant stating that so-called 'hashtag' feminism "[spread] real awareness of the struggles women face that [men] are not all the time aware of, and sometimes never aware of." The participants also felt that hashtag feminism was difficult for men to engage with, with one man stating that he doesn't "know how to engage with it in a way that doesn't come off as hostile."

=== Men's feminist media and advocacy ===
In more recent years, the number of men acting to publicly support feminism has increased; celebrities such as Justin Baldoni, Terry Crews, Matt McGorry, and Alan Cumming have spoken and acted in support of the movement. Baldoni's TED Talk, "Why I'm done trying to be man enough", asks questions like "are you brave enough to be vulnerable?" and "are you strong enough to be sensitive?" "Why I'm done trying to be man enough" touches on recognizing privilege, amplifying women's voices, and the importance of creating male friendships in which men can speak about real struggles together. In 2014, Terry Crews published his book, Manhood: How to Be a Better Man–or Just Live with One, a memoir discussing how to be a "good man, loving husband, and responsible father." Crews has also publicly voiced his support for gender equality in an interview with BUILD Series and on his Twitter account.

In addition to celebrities, former president Barack Obama authored an article titled "This is What a Feminist Looks Like", discussing gender roles and the need for everyone to fight sexism. Obama asserts that gender stereotypes "limit our ability to simply be ourselves" and that twenty-first century feminism is "the idea that when everybody is equal, we are all more free."

In September 2014, the Obama-Biden White House founded It's On Us, which became the largest nonprofit dedicated to preventing sexual assault on college campuses in the U.S.

In 2015, The Mask You Live In, a documentary film directed by Jennifer Siebel Newsom, premiered at Sundance Film Festival. The documentary details the environment and expectations that boys grow up with in the United States, using analysis from experts in various fields and firsthand accounts of experiences to illustrate how gender roles affect boys and men.

In 2017, Alec Baldwin, Michael Moore, Ian McKellen, Rufus Wainwright, and John Legend, along with a plethora of female public figures, attended women's marches across the country.

== Timeline ==
Date	Event/Campaign
2001	Gather the Women
2010	Hollaback Campaign
January 2011	The International Slutwalk
March 2011	#March4Women
October 2011	Project Unbreakable
2012	No More Page 3
April 2012	Everyday Sexism Project
2013	The Facebook Rape Campaign
January 2017	Women's March
October 2017	MeToo Movement
May 2022	United States abortion protests

== Criticism ==
Fourth-wave feminism has been criticised for its reliance on emerging digital technologies; it is necessary to ensure that underserved communities can engage with these technologies in an empowering manner. Ragna Rök Jóns argues that "[t]he key problem that this '4th Wave' will face will be the disproportionate access to and ownership of digital media devices", and that the fourth wave is left with the "inherent classism and ableism" created by giving the greatest voice to those who can afford and use technology, while the growth of social media in regions plagued by pervasive social injustice remains slow. North American sociologist Amanda E. Vickery claims that fourth-wave feminism marginalizes women of color who are fighting for inclusivity, neglecting the specific injustices they face to make way for the mainstream struggle.

Critics argue that efforts by large corporations such as Dove to capitalize on the movement through activist advertising may be inimical to fourth-wave feminism, which tends to be critical of capitalism as an economic system.

The conservative critique of fourth-wave feminism is that when women believe that the world is set against them through social systems such as patriarchy, they will abandon all efforts instead of competing with men as equals. Author Joanna Williams writes in The American Conservative that fourth-wave feminism encourages women to "call upon external helpmates, like the state and ugly identity politics that push good men away". Williams also associates the movement with the "regressive left", claiming fourth-wave feminists are authoritarian and illiberal by dictating acceptable ideologies and policing the speech of men and women.

It is also argued that when people participate in Internet activism, they may not feel the need to do anything else to help the effort and to make themselves feel good. This type of activism is addressed in feminist punk band Le Tigre's 2001 song "Get Off the Internet", from before social media came into the picture. Later, in 2015, Alex Guardado asserted in an article on Twitter activism for NewUniversity.org that after contributing their say, people "continue on with their day, liking other posts or retweeting". Some may think of themselves as activists while never attending a rally or extending their message beyond their Twitter fan base. While various feminist campaigns have spread via social media, the term slacktivism was coined to describe the mass media users who may speak out on their online platform but do little else to stimulate social action outside of their online platform. This forms part of a greater dialogue surrounding the roles and requirements of activism in an age where communities operate almost as equally online as they do face-to-face.

Jennifer Simpkins of The Huffington Post argued in 2014 that fourth-wave feminism had created a hostile, Mean Girls–like atmosphere, in which women are more likely to tear each other down. "I've actually never once been belittled and attacked by a man for believing in the cause of feminism ... but women are just about lining up to take a whack at the shoddy piñata of my personal tastes and opinions". British scholar Ealasaid Munro says that the call-out culture of fourth-wave feminism risks marginalizing and separating people over minor disagreements when they could serve better as allies.

Women and their gendered issues are not uniform and many variations in issues are a result of related issues such as race, sexuality and class and Munro also provides the critique that mainstream feminism is focused on the struggle of middle-class white women. Social campaigns that cast celebrities as the face of the movement, such as the Me Too movement, have been criticized, because celebrities often represent the privileged sectors of society, which in turn negate the efforts to expand upon the intersectionality of feminism.

The wave narrative itself is criticized due to perceptions that it is only inclusive of western feminist movements and that the fourth wave itself takes place in the global north, often neglecting the struggle of women in other regions. Critics also argue that using waves to define periods of feminism is no longer useful. They believe there is no need for it anymore and that it can get confusing. The wave narrative is also contested due to the overlapping nature of the waves of feminism and the lack of concrete definitions due to disagreements between scholars and activists as to what the waves respectively encompass.

Other critiques of fourth-wave feminism include its lack of clear evidence in most cases of social media use. Along with this, some argue that, though all issues should be addressed, smaller issues should not be inflated by the feminist movement. One example of this is Matt Damon's response to the Harvey Weinstein case, "I do believe that there is a spectrum of behaviour, right? [...] There's a difference between, you know, patting someone on the butt and rape or child molestation, right?" Social media also can be seen as ineffective as it brings down "bogeyman" individuals rather than, "invent[ing] a different language or logic that can excise or alter the structures of oppression" as Sarah K. Burgess describes.

== See also ==
- Anarcha-feminism
- Equity feminism
- Feminism and media
- Materialist feminism
- Political lesbianism
- Postcolonial feminism
- Postfeminism
- Radical feminism
- Riot grrrl
- r/Feminism
- Social justice warrior
- Transfeminism
- Who Needs Feminism?

== Citations ==
=== General and cited references ===
- Bates, Laura (2014). Everyday Sexism. London: Simon & Schuster. ISBN 978-1-4711-3157-8.
- Baumgardner, Jennifer (2011). F'em! Goo Goo, Gaga, and Some Thoughts on Balls. Berkeley, California: Seal Press. ISBN 978-1-58005-360-0.
- Chamberlain, Prudence (2017). The Feminist Fourth Wave: Affective Temporality. Palgrave Macmillan. doi:10.1007/978-3-319-53682-8. ISBN 978-3-319-53682-8.
