= Gender inequality in the United Kingdom =

Gender inequality is any situation in which people are not treated equally on the basis of gender. In the United Kingdom, some people say women are unequally impacted by economic policies, face different levels of media attention, and face inequality in education and employment, which includes a persistent national gender pay gap. Furthermore, according to numerous sources, there exists a pervasive lad culture which has decreased the ability of women to participate in different parts of society.

In response to gender inequality, the state has introduced various pieces of legislation, intended to protect individuals against sex-based discrimination and mandating equal pay for equal work.

== Legislation ==
In response to the concerns, the government has implemented various legislation, especially concerning gender discrimination, both institutional and personal, in the workplace; the Sex Discrimination Act of 1975 protects individuals from being discriminated against in employment, vocational training, education, the provision and sale of goods, facilities and services, premises and the exercise of public functions due to their sex/gender; this was amended by the Sex Discrimination (Election Candidates) Act 2002. The Equal Pay Act of 1970 mandates equal pay for equal work regardless of an individual's sex/gender, and the Sex Discrimination (Gender Reassignment) Regulations 1999 also protect the rights of individuals who intend to undergo, are undergoing, or have undergone sex reassignment. These Regulations pertain to pay and treatment in employment, self-employment and vocational training.

The Equality Acts of 2006 and 2010 served to codify and combine all equality enactments within Great Britain, and provide comparable protections across all equality strands.

The Equality and Human Rights Commission (EHRC) is a non-departmental public body which has responsibility for the promotion and enforcement of equality and non-discrimination laws in England, Scotland and Wales, while the Government Equalities Office is a government department charged with promoting and improving gender equality within the UK government itself, responsible for leading the Discrimination Law Review, and providing advice on all other forms of equality to other UK government departments. The GEO was formerly known as the Women and Equality Unit.

== Issues ==
=== Culture ===
It has increasingly been observed that a pervasive 'lad culture' has developed in the U.K., described as an ironic, self-conscious method for young males to adopt "an anti-intellectual position, scorning sensitivity and caring in favour of drinking, violence, and a pre-feminist attitude to women as both sex objects and creatures from another species". In April 2014, the UN special rapporteur on violence against women similarly concluded that Britain has a "boys' club sexist culture".

The culture has attracted wide criticism from feminist circles; Germaine Greer critiques it in her 2000 book The Whole Woman, while Kira Cochrane asserts that "it's a dark world that Loaded and the lad culture has bequeathed us".

Commentators believe that lad culture has affected politics and decreased the ability of women to participate, and studies of industries such as the architecture profession found that lad culture had a negative impact on women completing their professional education.

In April 2012, British feminist writer Laura Bates founded the Everyday Sexism Project, a website and social media presence whose aim is to document everyday examples of sexism as reported by contributors; the submissions are then collated by a small group of volunteers led by Emer O'Toole, a researcher at Royal Holloway, University of London. By April 2013 the site had collected 25,000 entries from 15 countries.

=== Media ===
Various U.K. media institutions have been labelled problematic with regards to sexism and gender discrimination - most notably being the Page 3 feature found in the British tabloid newspaper The Sun, which once consisted of a large photograph of a topless female glamour model usually published on the newspaper's third page. In August 2012, the No More Page 3 campaign emerged, sparking widespread discussion and receiving heavy support from Green MP Caroline Lucas and cross-party support from over 140 other MPs.

A YouGov survey in October 2012 found differences in attitude toward Page 3 among readers of different newspapers; 61% of Sun readers wished to retain the feature, while 24 percent said that the newspaper should stop showing Page 3 women. However, only 4% of Guardian readers said The Sun should keep Page 3, while 86% said it should be abolished. The poll also found wide differences by gender, with 48% of men overall saying that Page 3 should be retained, but just 17% of women taking that position.

=== Employment ===
The U.K. has a persistent gender pay gap, the most significant factors associated with which are part-time work, education, the size of the firm from which the sample is taken, and occupational segregation (women are under-represented in managerial and high-paying professional occupations.) When comparing full-time roles, men in the U.K. tend to work slightly longer hours than women in full-time employment. Depending on the age bracket and percentile of hours worked men in full-time employment work between 1.35% and 17.94% more hours than women in full-time employment. Even when taking the differences in hours worked into account, a pay gap still exists in the U.K., and typically increases with age and earnings percentile.

In 2015, 1.1% of men and 3% of women perceived gender-based discrimination in their workplace.

=== Education ===
Inequality in the context of education has greater implications in terms of future employment. Elements of the school curriculum still advocate certain gender-specific practices.

Boys lag behind girls at important educational milestones. At Key Stage 2 girls outperform boys. The proportion of students achieving level 4 and above in reading, writing and maths, in 2015, in England, was 77% boys compared to 83% girls. The gap is wider for students who receive a free school meal.

Girls outperform boys in headline GCSE results. In state-funded schools, the gap in those achieving 5+ grades a*-C including English and maths is around 10 percentage points.

Young women are more likely to enroll at university. In 2016 the gender gap in favour of women was the highest on record. "In England, young women are 36% more likely to apply to university and when both sexes are from disadvantaged backgrounds young women are 58% more likely to apply."

Relationship Education has been compulsory in the U.K. at both primary and secondary level since September 2020, but parents have a right to withdraw their child from Sex Education and in England and Wales, the optional curriculum focuses mainly on biological areas such as the reproductive system, foetal development, and the physical changes of adolescence, while information about contraception and safe sex is discretionary and discussion about relationships and gender roles is often neglected.

In April 2014, Bates remarked that "better sex and relationships education in schools is desperately needed" to teach areas around "healthy relationships, consent, respect and sexual abuse" in response to tackling everyday sexism earlier in life.

=== Economic policy ===
In England, austerity disproportionately affects women, because women use more public services and are the majority of welfare recipients.\

== See also ==
- Women's suffrage in the United Kingdom
