= Vagenda =

Vagenda, a portmanteau of vagina and agenda, may refer to:

- Vagenda, a series of tasks a woman carries out with sex in order to ensure the success of her plans.

First known use was in the Fox show, FRINGE, after it was discovered that Peter was sleeping with the alternate universe version of Olivia.

"It's all because of that temptress! She tricked my son with her carnal manipulations and he fell RIGHT into her vagenda." - Walter Bishop, FRINGE S3E8 - 2010

- The Vagenda, a feminist online magazine launched in January 2012.
- Hidden Vagenda, the fourth solo album by American singer-songwriter Kimya Dawson
