= Fix the System, Not the Women =

2022 nonfiction book written by Laura Bates

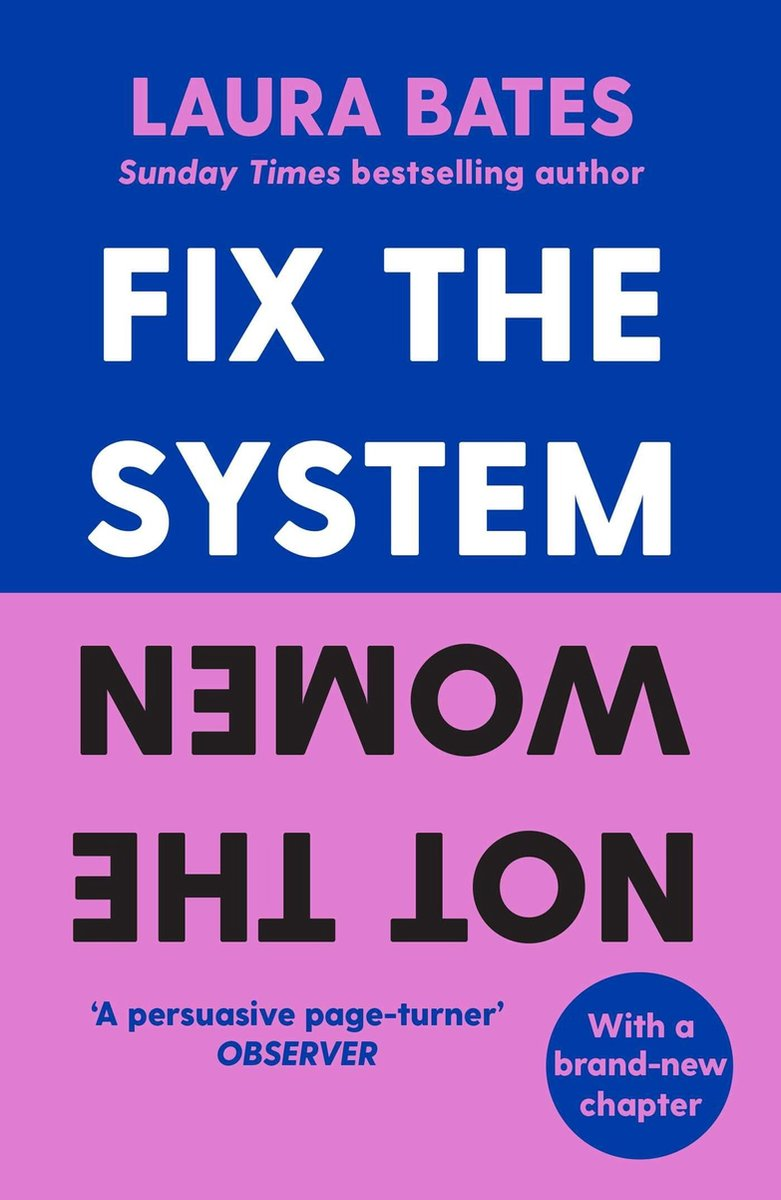
- Author: Laura Bates
- Language: English
- Subject: Feminism, gender inequality, systemic bias
- Genre: Nonfiction
- Publisher: Simon & Schuster
- Publication date: 2022
- Publication place: United Kingdom
- Media type: Print, eBook
- Pages: 224
- ISBN: 9781398523401
- Preceded by: Men Who Hate Women

Fix the System, Not the Women is a 2022 book by British feminist writer and activist Laura Bates. It critically examines systemic gender inequality across five key societal institutions—education, politics, media, policing, and criminal justice—and calls for structural reforms to address these issues rather than placing the burden on women to adapt.

== Overview ==
Laura Bates argues that societal structures perpetuate gender-based injustices by failing to accommodate women equitably. The book explores how entrenched biases in institutions contribute to discrimination and violence against women. Bates combines personal anecdotes, real-life stories from contributors to her Everyday Sexism Project, and statistical evidence to highlight these systemic failures.

Bates critiques systemic sexism in education, politics, media, policing, and criminal justice. She illustrates how these institutions fail to protect or empower women, often exacerbating inequality. The book challenges societal tendencies to blame women for their own victimization—whether for walking home alone or not demanding equal opportunities—and emphasizes the need for systemic accountability. Bates also addresses how gender inequality intersects with other forms of discrimination, such as race and class.

== Critical reception ==
The Observer described it as "an astute and persuasive page-turner", while the Sunday Times called it "powerful" in summarizing the injustices women face. Dr. Pragya Agarwal highlighted its optimism and urgency, describing it as "a blistering manifesto for change".
