= The New Age of Sexism: How the AI Revolution Is Reinventing Misogyny =

2025 book by Laura Bates

The New Age of Sexism
- Author: Laura Bates
- Language: English
- Subjects: Artificial intelligence, misogyny, feminism
- Publisher: Simon & Schuster
- Publication date: 15 May 2025
- Publication place: United Kingdom
- Media type: Print (hardcover), e-book, audiobook
- Pages: 320
- ISBN: 978-1-4711-9048-3

The New Age of Sexism: How the AI Revolution Is Reinventing Misogyny is a 2025 non-fiction book by British feminist writer Laura Bates. Published by Simon & Schuster, the book examines how artificial intelligence, virtual reality and other emerging technologies can reproduce or intensify existing forms of misogyny and gender inequality.

Bates argues that technological systems are shaped by the data, commercial incentives and social assumptions behind their development. The book discusses subjects including algorithmic discrimination, artificial intelligence-generated abuse, virtual assistants, AI companions and harassment in online environments.

== Synopsis ==
The book examines the relationship between technological development and longstanding inequalities affecting women. Bates argues that artificial intelligence is not inherently sexist, but that technology can reflect the biases present in its training data, design teams and commercial environment.

The book considers how automated systems may affect recruitment, financial services, healthcare and access to opportunities. It also examines the gendered design of virtual assistants, the development of artificial companions, harassment in the metaverse and the use of artificial intelligence to create abusive false images.

Bates draws on interviews with technology developers, researchers and women affected by online abuse. She also describes her own investigations into virtual environments, artificial companions and businesses using technology to simulate human relationships.

A central argument of the book is that debates about technological progress often give limited attention to who designs new systems, who profits from them and who is exposed to their risks. Bates connects this issue to the under-representation of women in artificial intelligence research, investment and corporate leadership.

== Reception ==
Barbara Ellen of The Observer wrote that the book might initially appear alarmist but found much of its evidence persuasive. She praised Bates for exposing the relationship between artificial intelligence and misogyny. Ellen also observed that books about rapidly developing technologies risk becoming dated and noted that Bates did not offer a complete answer to reversing the developments she described.

Writing in the New Statesman, Pippa Bailey described the book as a "profoundly disturbing tour" of emerging technology and the gendered power structures surrounding it.

Scarlett Harris of Wired highlighted the book's first-hand research and its use of interviews with developers and women affected by artificial intelligence-generated abuse. Harris presented the book as a warning that emerging technology could become a new means of restricting and exploiting women if it developed without effective regulation.

Coverage in The Independent focused on Bates's investigation of artificial companions and technology-based businesses. The article also included responses from industry representatives who disputed parts of her account, along with researchers who shared concerns about bias, consent and the effect of artificial relationships on human behaviour.

A review published by the National Organization for Women praised the book for connecting newer forms of online abuse with established patterns of misogyny and discrimination. The review argued that technological systems could reproduce unequal social structures when developers failed to recognise the assumptions built into them.
