= Other People's Clothes =

2021 novel by Calla Henkel

- First edition
- Author: Calla Henkel
- Language: English
- Genre: Suspense/Thriller
- Set in: Berlin, Germany
- Publisher: Sceptre
- Publication date: July 31, 2021
- Publication place: United States of America
- Media type: Print (hardcover)
- Pages: 320

Other People's Clothes is a novel written by German-American novelist Calla Henkel. Her debut novel, it was first published in 2021 by Sceptre, an imprint of Hachette.

== Reception ==
Rhiannon Lucy Cosslett writing for The Guardian called it a "A whirlwind of screwball comedy, murder and friendship that examines the cannibalisation of experience to feed social media".
