= Gendered impact of the COVID-19 pandemic =

Aspect of viral outbreak

COVID-19 affects men and women differently both in terms of the outcome of infection and the effect of the disease upon society. The mortality due to COVID-19 is higher in men. Slightly more men than women contract COVID with a ratio of 10:9.

School closures, lockdowns and reduced access to healthcare following the COVID-19 pandemic may differentially affect the genders and possibly exaggerate existing gender disparities.

== Sex differences in mortality ==
More men than women die after being affected by COVID-19. In Italy, the greater risk for men starts in their 50s, with the gap between men and women closing only at 90. In China, the death rate was 2.8 percent for men and 1.7 percent for women. However, in a few countries like India, Nepal, Vietnam, and Slovenia the fatality cases are higher in women than men.

The higher mortality rate in men is consistent with other respiratory diseases, which show a similar disparity. Genetic, social, and behavioral factors may play a part. Sex-based immunological differences, lesser prevalence of smoking in women and men developing co-morbid conditions such as hypertension at a younger age than women could have contributed to the higher mortality in men. However, since both professional and home care affairs are traditionally linked to women, they may have had a higher infection rate than men in some places. For example, in Spain since the sanitary crisis began, healthcare workers have been more affected than anyone else. Almost 50,000 of them have been affected, of whom 66% are women.

As of April 2020, the US government was not tracking sex-related data of COVID-19 infections. However, researchers and expert organizations such as UN Women have argued that data on COVID-19 infection should be sex-disaggregated. This would allow to develop solutions to the pandemic from a gender-equitable perspective, since sex-differences in fatality rates have been identified. Also, it would allow experts to deliver high-quality data separately to men and women.

Data has changed throughout the course of the pandemic, as much within as between countries. However, what has remained constant is the prevalence of women affected by COVID-19 in contrast to men, although the fatalities have not been as high as theirs. This was especially so at the beginning of the pandemic. This might be due to the fact that both professional and home care affairs have been an area relegated to women in history. These are obviously closer to the virus than other areas of work. Regarding age and sex, in India, for instance, COVID-19 cases between men and women did not represent a uniform ratio among different age groups. Mortality rates were higher in women, especially in the 40-49 year age group. Research has shown that other viral illnesses like Ebola, HIV, influenza and SARS affect men and women differently. For example, according to a report by the WHO in 2007, more than half the SARS cases at the beginning of 2000 were women.

== Impact on health ==
=== Women in medical roles ===
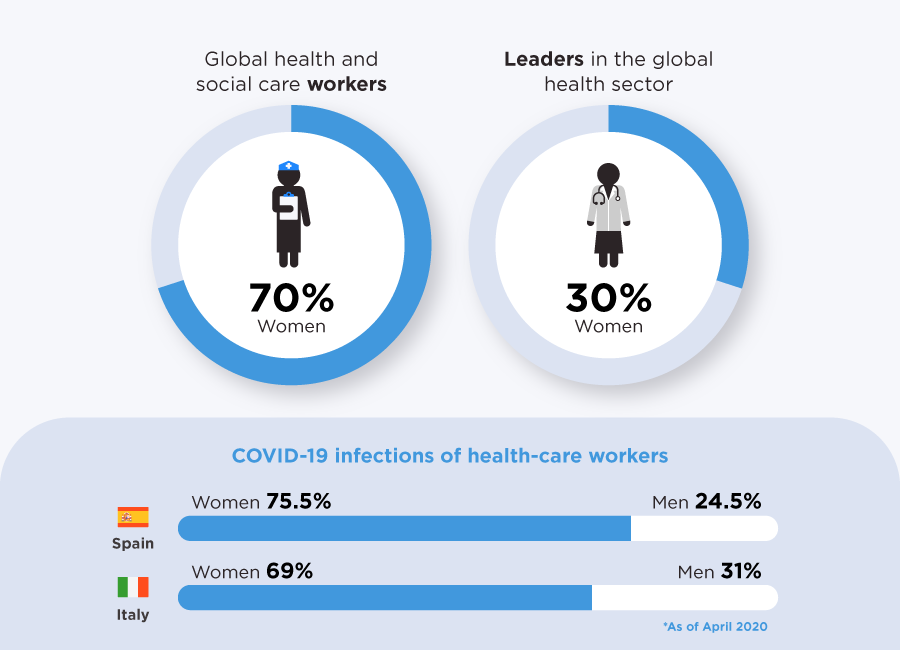
70% of global health and social care workers are women, 30% of leaders in the global health sector are women

Globally, women make up 70 percent of workers in the health and social sector. 90% of the healthcare workers in China's Hubei province (where the disease originated) were women and 78% of the healthcare workers in the USA are women. Women are playing a disproportionate role in responding to the disease, including as front line healthcare workers (as well as caregivers at home and community leaders and mobilisers). In some countries, COVID-19 infections among female health workers are twice that of their male counterparts. Women are still paid much less than their male counterparts in almost all countries and hold fewer leadership positions in the health sector. Masks and other protective equipment designed and sized for men leave women at greater risk of exposure.

As of 14 August 2020, the number of nurse deaths reported by COVID-19 was 1,097 in 44 countries. According to the Conselho Federal de Enfermagem (COFEN Brasil, the Brazilian Nursing Association), as of 11 August 2020, 351 deaths related to COVID-19 had been registered among nurses in Brazil, which is the highest number of deaths of nurses in the entire data set.

=== Women as students ===
College students are a vulnerable group and this community is among those most affected by the impact of COVID-19, especially women. More than ten studies conducted in the United States identify women as being at the greatest risk for psychological distress during the COVID-19 pandemic.

They are generally prone to depression and anxiety disorders and appear to be more strongly affected by the long-term psychological impacts of the pandemic. One study attributed these gender differences to greater emotional expression, lower tolerance for uncertainty, and less effective coping strategies among female students. In addition, these studies highlight certain factors that make women more likely to experience these problems, such as being of Asian origin, being in fair to poor health, having a lower than average family or personal income, and knowing someone in their community who has been infected with COVID-19.

=== Access to healthcare ===
Women and girls, who already faced health and safety implications in managing their sexual and reproductive health and menstrual hygiene without access to clean water and private toilets before the crisis, are particularly in danger. When healthcare systems are overburdened and resources are reallocated to respond to the pandemic, this can further disrupt health services unique to the well-being of women and girls. This includes pre- and post-natal healthcare, access to quality sexual and reproductive health services, and life-saving care and support for survivors of gender-based violence. Women are also refraining from visiting health facilities due to fears about COVID-19 exposure or due to movement restrictions.

The health impacts can be catastrophic, especially in rural, marginalized and low-literacy communities, where women are less likely to have access to quality, culturally-accessible health services, essential medicines or insurance coverage. Before the pandemic, around 810 women died every day from preventable causes related to pregnancy and childbirth—94 per cent of these deaths occurred in low and lower middle-income countries. Past pandemics have shown increased rates of maternal mortality and morbidity, adolescent pregnancies, and HIV and other sexually transmitted diseases. Multiple and intersecting inequalities, such as ethnicity, socioeconomic status, disability, age, race, geographic location and sexual orientation, among others, can further compound these impacts. It is essential to mention the age structure of the countries' populations. For example, the case fatality rate for COVID-19 is lower in India than in the US since India's younger population represents a larger percentage than in the US.

=== Reproductive health ===
During an outbreak, healthcare resources are diverted to combat the disease, which results in down-prioritizing reproductive health of women. The physiological changes in pregnancy puts women at an increased risk for some infections, although evidence is lacking particularly about COVID-19. Women had a higher risk of developing severe illness when affected with influenza virus (which belongs to the same family as COVID-19), so it is important to protect pregnant women from being infected with COVID-19. Women nurses were reported to have decreased access to tampons and sanitary pads while also working overtime without adequate personal protective equipment during the COVID-19 pandemic in mainland China. Moreover, the confinement measures themselves hinder access to health services, including sexual, reproductive and/or maternal health. Various researchers have speculated that coronavirus may harm male fertility, either from direct viral effects or from the immune response inflammation.

=== Pregnant women in the pandemic ===
==== Social perspective ====
The specialized medical journal BMJ sheds light on the risk COVID-19 poses to pregnant women and their babies. The article indicates that pregnant women with COVID-19 suspected or confirmed to have been cared for in hospital are often less likely to experience fever or muscle aches, but if they get a serious illness, they are more likely to need intensive care than non-pregnant women with COVID-19.

According to the ISGlobal (Barcelona Institute for Global Health), pregnant women are one of the groups most vulnerable to COVID-19 due to their morbidity and mortality in epidemics. During pregnancy, physiological changes in the lungs and adaptation of immunity may increase the susceptibility and clinical severity of COVID-19 pneumonia, so pregnant women are at increased risk of severe COVID-19 problems.

The Spanish Society of Gynaecology and Obstetrics (SEGO) presented a document based on experience during several epidemics where the close association of these infections with severe respiratory problems and even risk of death during pregnancy is exposed. There is increasing evidence that the mother can transmit the virus to the fetus, especially during the last months of pregnancy.

Another factor that has had a major influence on care for pregnant women during the pandemic is access to reproductive health programmes. There has been a marked reduction in face-to-face antenatal visits, which have been replaced by telephone consultations. Yet, in low-income countries, even these have not been replaced, putting prenatal and child health at greater risk.

In terms of reproductive health, there are two types of situations depending on the economy of the society and the country: in low-income countries, unwanted pregnancies have increased due to less access to family planning services and an increase in gender-based violence. Not only that, but there is also a marked increase in maternal mortality associated with unsafe abortions and girls and women dropping out of school. The impact on maternal and child health in low-income countries is therefore of great concern, as their resilience during COVID-19 and beyond is very difficult.

In contrast to low-income countries, we observe that, in high-income countries, there has been a decline in birth rates due to a decline in assisted reproduction due to a deterioration in family finances and changes in reproductive priorities.

===== Assistance and recovery =====
In research:

It is necessary to promote the inclusion of women in clinical trials of pharmaceutical products for the treatment and prevention of COVID-19, in addition to including disaggregated data (sex, age, pregnancy status in epidemiological studies...). It is worth mentioning that answering key questions and conducting qualitative studies to understand the effects of COVID-19 on emotional health and social impact during pregnancy would help to improve the management and prevention of infection.

In public health:

COVID-19 prevention guidelines should be established for pregnant women and their entourage, including that, following hygiene and safety protocol, they can attend antenatal visits and childbirth accompanied. In addition to adapting the frequency of face-to-face prenatal visits and complementing them with telematic monitoring. In order to identify pregnant women exposed to the virus in advance, it is advisable to record pregnancy status in contact tracing and prioritise them for COVID-19 diagnostic testing.

In communication

It would be supportive to publish COVID-19 news concerning pregnancy to improve reproductive health knowledge in the general population and thus provide an adequate risk perception with reality, including its corresponding dissemination for specific groups (pregnant women). Promoting an open dialogue, such as interviews, with people specialised in topics such as childbirth, obstetrics, paediatrics..., helps to provide families and/or pregnant women with quality information.

==== Medical perspective ====
SARS-CoV-2 is an encapsidated single-stranded RNA virus, so it requires a well-functioning immune system to fight it. However, the infection can cause a mild illness, and the immune system can effectively clear it, but it can also cause a more severe illness, which is why there are so many deaths. In pregnant women, the immune system is adapted to the development of the fetus. For this reason, special care must be taken with pregnant women, because in the event of contracting an infection, it can be harmful as their immune system is altered.

To understand the COVID-19 phenotype during pregnancy, it is important to understand the pathophysiology and molecular mechanisms of COVID-19 and examine these in the context of the modulated maternal immune response. This excessive inflammation is thought to be the cause of severe COVID-19 and is associated with high morbidity and mortality. The modulations of the maternal immune system in pregnancy may affect the response to infections, and specifically to viruses.

Alterations in the innate immune system, including the pattern recognition receptors, Toll-like receptors during pregnancy. COVID-19 infection causes pyroptosis of host cells and release of DAMPs, which can be TLR ligands and further enhance inflammation. The role that the innate immune system and TLRs play in the COVID-19 immune response still needs to be investigated to understand how pregnancy affects this particular aspect of the viral response.

These modulations in the maternal immune system have consequences for the clinical trajectory of COVID-19 and the treatment and prevention of COVID-19 in pregnancy. However, it remains to be determined whether these adaptations result in a higher susceptibility and/or morbidity or are, in fact, protective against COVID-19. It is unclear whether disease severity has consequences for COVID-19 immunity in the nonpregnant population. In addition to the systemic immunological changes of pregnancy that have the potential to have an impact on lung function, anatomical changes also are present in the respiratory system.

Although there is a 30–40 % increase in tidal volume, the reduction in chest volume leads to a decrease in functional residual capacity, end-expiratory volumes, and residual volumes from early in pregnancy. In the general population, COVID-19 is associated with high rates of thromboembolic complications, with a study including 184 critically unwell patients reporting that 31% had thrombotic events. Current guidelines recommend that all pregnant women with confirmed COVID-19 should have thromboprophylaxis until 10 days postnatal and that their clinicians have a low threshold for investigation of possible thromboembolism. Maternal vascular adaptation to pregnancy is critical for optimal pregnancy outcomes.

===== Placenta =====
There have been a series of case reports examining the placentas of women with COVID-19. Multiple studies have reported significant pathological changes in the placental tissue of SARS-CoV-2 positive mothers. SARS-CoV-2 was found on RT-PCR of swabs and biopsies following a spontaneous fetal loss at 19 wk. gestation, SARS-CoV-2 was also highly expressed in placental and umbilical cord biopsies following a termination of pregnancy at 22-wk gestation. The pregnancy was terminated as a result of placental abruption and severe maternal preeclampsia with thrombocytopenia and coagulopathy. The placentas were from babies born between 16 and 40 wk. gestation, with 11 of the maternal SARS-CoV-2 infections diagnosed around the time of birth, and five diagnosed earlier in pregnancy.

An international study suggests that rather than fetal death being caused by infection, the effect of the virus on the placenta leads to a lack of oxygen, a condition the study called "SARS-CoV-2 placentitis". This condition leads to reduced blood flow and oxygen in the placenta. The study also focused on the defenses offered by the placenta is protecting the fetus from COVID-19: "The placenta is likely putting many defense mechanisms in place to combat SARS-CoV-2 at the maternal-fetal interface".

===== Vertical transmission =====
Viral infection of placental cells does not necessarily mean fetal infection or fetal harm. So far, 15 reports include neonatal test results for SARS-CoV-2 with positive cases occurring only in the minority. Significant neonatal respiratory diseases appear to be rare, even in the presence of SARS-CoV-2 positivity. Circulating SARS-CoV-2 IgM in the neonate, indicates vertical transmission of the virus, although all the infants in reports so far have been asymptomatic and tested negative for SARS-CoV-2 viral RNA at birth.

In the lungs, SARS-CoV-2 uses the ACE2 receptor to enter cells, and serine protease TMPRSS2 is implicated in cleaving the spike glycoprotein to allow fusion. Given the lack of ACE2 and TMPRSS2 coexpression in the placenta, it, therefore, seems likely that SARS-CoV-2 enters the placental tissues via an alternative mechanism. SARS-Cov-2 viral RNA has been detected in the amniotic fluid in case reports of serious maternal disease, although neonatal positivity at birth was variable. Many viruses have established effects on the mother and the fetus during pregnancy and may provide information on the potential impact and mechanism of COVID-19 in pregnancy.

===== Fetus =====
A study using birth registry data in the United States found that early pregnancy coinciding with high population levels of seasonal influenza was significantly associated with preterm birth, neonatal and infant mortality. A 13-yr cohort study in Nova Scotia found that women hospitalized with influenza during pregnancy were significantly more likely to have a baby who was small for gestational age. In a UK cohort, H1N1 infection during pregnancy was associated with an increase in preterm birth and perinatal mortality.

===== Breastfeeding =====
There has been one case study in which breast milk tested positive for SARS-CoV-2 on four different occasions. In another study, samples of breast milk of nine SARS-CoV-2-positive mothers were tested, and none were positive. Given that neonatal infection is generally mild and often asymptomatic, the benefits of breastfeeding may outweigh the potential transmission risk.

===== Asymptomatic disease =====
The clinical significance of having asymptomatic infection during pregnancy at any gestation is unknown. The unintended consequences of the COVID-19 pandemic pose a threat to the health of pregnant women. We can expect the downstream effects of COVID-19 to be apparent for several years. From the current evidence base, it is difficult to draw absolute conclusions on whether pregnant women are at increased risk of severe consequences of COVID-19.

The lack of universal COVID-19 testing means that it is likely that the majority of cases go undetected. There are many unknowns, in particular, whether COVID-19 is an independent risk factor for preterm birth, whether infection during pregnancy is likely to lead to long-term adverse effects in offspring, and whether this effect is dependent on gestational age at infection. To answer these questions, the establishment of both data repositories and biobanks of women with confirmed or suspected COVID-19 is crucial. Despite concerns about the increased vulnerability of pregnant women to COVID-19, in more than 300 clinical trials investigating potential therapeutic options, pregnant women are almost universally excluded.

Very few clinical trials include pregnant women, even those investigating treatments with a well-established safety record in pregnancy, such as hydroxychloroquine.

===== Vaccination =====
With all these data, the World Health Organisation (WHO) has issued advice on the COVID-19 vaccines from Pfizer-BioNTech and Moderna and does not recommend vaccination of pregnant women. The WHO recommends that if a pregnant woman works as a health worker, she should be vaccinated.

The reason pregnant women are not included is that, according to Dr Ruth Faden of Johns Hopkins University, pregnant women cannot be included in clinical trials and involve certain risk to either the mother or the baby, as has been the case since before the pandemic. According to Carleigh Krubine, with the pandemic, the lack of data may cause many to hesitate to use highly beneficial and ultimately safe vaccines leading them to vaccination, which will protect and promote both, maternal and neonatal health.

Different countries are taking different approaches to the vaccination of pregnant women. In the UK, if a pregnant woman meets the definition of being clinically extremely vulnerable, then she should discuss COVID-19 vaccine options with her obstetrician and/or doctor. Others, such as Israel, are including pregnant women with high morbidity risk factors among those with priority access to COVID-19 vaccines, without considering the risks to them or their fetuses. In contrast, India has explicitly stated that pregnant and breastfeeding women should not receive the injections until further studies are conducted.

However, data from such clinical trials involving pregnant women may take months or years, says Huma Farid, an obstetrician and gynaecologistat Beth Israel Deaconess Medical Center in Boston, USA, and an instructor at Harvard Medical School. Nevertheless, preliminary data on how the coronavirus may affect pregnant women offer a mixed picture. Most pregnant women experience only mild or moderate symptoms.

On the other hand, the question of what pregnant women should do arises, and according to Dr Huma Farid, for many doctors, the mere suggestion of a serious infection is worrying as there is an increased risk for pregnant patients who have COVID-19 and we also know that, in general, the vaccines are safe. She refers especially to the Moderna and Pfizer messenger RNA vaccines, which use a small fragment of the genetic code of the virus.

Another paradigm that arises is whether it affects breastfeeding mothers equally. There is a consensus among experts that there is no reason for breastfeeding women to avoid COVID-19 vaccination if they are eligible for it. Dr Huma Farid has recommended that breastfeeding mothers get vaccinated, as any antibodies they create against the virus will be passed on to their babies through their breast milk and that will protect them from the virus. According to the WHO, so far there is no evidence that breastfeeding mother or their babies are at high risk of severe COVID-19.

For women who are trying to become pregnant, experts have looked at the initial evidence and say there is no need to avoid pregnancy after vaccination. According to Carleigh Krubiner, there is no evidence to suggest that COVID-19 vaccines will affect fertility, nor any biologically plausible mechanism for how they might impact fertility.

===== Contraceptives =====
Supply chain disruptions are limiting availability of contraceptives in many places, and stock-outs of many contraceptive methods are anticipated within the next 6 months in more than a dozen lowest- income countries by UNFPA. Product shortages and lack of access to trained providers or clinics mean that women may be unable to use their preferred method of contraception, may instead use a less effective short-term method, or may discontinue contraceptive use entirely. 47 million women in 114 low and middle-income countries are projected by UNFPA to be unable to use modern contraceptives if the average lockdown, or COVID-19-related disruption, continues for 6 months with major disruptions to services: For every 3 months the lockdown continues, assuming high levels of disruption, up to 2 million additional women may be unable to use modern contraceptives. If the lockdown continues for 6 months and there are major service disruptions due to COVID-19, an additional 7 million unintended pregnancies are expected to occur by UNFPA. The number of unintended pregnancies will increase as the lockdown continues and services disruptions are extended. Reduced access is likely to more adversely affect younger, poorer and more vulnerable and marginalized populations.

===== Abortion policies =====
The government of Argentina was planning to submit a bill to the Congress to grant abortion rights to women in March 2022, after the official announcement of president Alberto Fernández in his speech opening the Congress sessions. However, the submission of the bill was postponed due to the coronavirus crisis and the lock down of the country. Provision of abortion services under the current law is still being granted in the country, albeit with challenges due to some provinces that have historically opposed abortion. The Ministry of Women of Argentina is working to facilitate abortion through the establishment of a helpline that women can call to obtain information. In December 2020, Argentina passed legislation to legally allow abortion.

===== Menstruation =====
In a number of countries, the provision of sanitary supplies were considered non-essential. In Wales, Tesco was forced to apologise after it included sanitary towels and tampons within its ban of 'non-essential items during a 17-day lockdown'. In India, there was a 'sanitary pad crisis' after the coronavirus lockdown meant delivery of sanitary napkins was heavily impacted. This was attributed to the closure of schools where pads are usually supplied to all female students. The provision of these supplies at school were introduced following a study which found nearly 23 million women in India had dropped out of school due to the lack of sufficient menstrual hygiene supplies. Issues with supplies in India were also reported on 25 March after sanitary napkins were not classified as essential items and were therefore included in the restrictions.

=== Clinical trials ===
Women are underrepresented in clinical trials for vaccines and drugs, as a result of which sex-differences in disease response could be ignored in scientific studies.

Women might respond to COVID-19 infection differently and they might have a different response to various treatments. According to data available at the digital repository PMC, COVID-19 seems to infect men and women similarly, though men appear to have a higher risk of death or acute respiratory distress syndrome (ARDS) than women.

In addition, the restrictive measures have different repercussions on men and women separately, given that women have needs that are different from those of men, in terms of health, safety, or everyday activity.

Therefore, gender equality should be always guaranteed, various health and scientific organizations should hear the voice of women in any decision-making for the COVID-19. the obligation by various health and scientific organizations to hear the voice of women in any decision-making for the COVID-19.

=== Nutrition ===
During public health emergencies, women are at an increased risk of malnutrition.

== Gender disparity in leadership ==
In Spain, the situation is similar, the late response by the Minister of Health or the President of the Government, all male characters as in the United States, caused a considerable increase in the number of infected people in the country due to their poor instructions. According to our leaders, everything was under control in Spain until there was a collapse in the country's hospitals and health centers.

For this reason, health workers, especially female characters such as nurses and doctors decided to accomplish a clear proposal that received the name of #QuédateEnCasa through social networks. It was a complete success, reducing the number of deaths and those infected by COVID-19. In addition, the use of social networks was completely successful due to nowadays millions of people use them today, which made the fundamental message diffuse faster and better.

In conclusion, female health workers have achieved what others have not been able to, therefore, it is necessary to raise awareness that women can also propose good ideas.

== Economic impact on women ==
According to multiple sources, including the United States Senate Committee on Small Business and Entrepreneurship and the United States Chamber of Commerce , the pandemic has disproportionately impacted women-owned businesses. The United States Senate Committee said that "women-owned small businesses were particularly hard hit" and the report found that while 62% of male business owners reported their business was doing well, only 47% of female business owners reported the same confidence. In many countries, women have been hit hardest by COVID-19 lockdowns.

=== The serious impacts of the pandemic on gender inequalities ===
The Latin American Council of Social Sciences states that the burden of care falls on women and that the appearance of new gender divisions at work, as a result of this pandemic that we are having to live, are increasingly unsustainable. In Latin America, for example, women were 50% more likely to lose a job during the first months of the pandemic. Their main concerns are: more than half of women work on a temporary basis or in very low-quality conditions, so they are more likely to lose their jobs. Moreover, women tend to be employed in vulnerable sectors such as retail, restaurants and hospitality. They also often work in informal jobs, from selling wares on the streets to sewing at home, that lack protections such as paid sick leave or unemployment insurance. To this we must add that, with the closure of schools, many women have no one to leave their children with. Many migrant domestic workers have lost their jobs and, similarly, those working in Europe may be forced to return to their countries without any income. "Stay at home" has been a burden for women who have to take care of their children, elderly or other dependents. With home working, women are forced to take care of the home and their work responsibilities at the same time. It is women who mainly care for COVID patients, so their risk of infection increases. Most of the health sector is made up of women (nurses, auxiliaries, cleaners...), they work in precarious situations with low salaries, and, in addition, they do not have sufficient protections. It is the state that has to take charge of guaranteeing the basic rights of its citizens in order to create a more egalitarian post-pandemic scenario. Commissions formed by experts to advise governments have almost no women at all, when it is women who are on the front line. Experiences in past crises such as the Ebola crisis in conflict regions such as the Democratic Republic of Congo showed that school closures exacerbated inequalities, as girls are less likely to return to school than boys. A global analysis in The Lancet found that women were more likely than men to experience employment loss during the COVID-19 pandemic, women and girls were also more likely to drop out of school and faced higher levels of gender-based violence. They are also constrained in finding work or forced to take on extra household chores. The under-representation of women in informal and agricultural jobs can also exacerbate economic inequalities. In situations of fragility, conflict and violence, only 4 women out of 10 are formally employed, a figure that drops to 2 out of 10 in situations of ongoing conflict. Various studies also show that the socioeconomic challenges and burdens that disproportionately affected women are known to be associated with greater negative mental health changes and stress compared to men.

Moreover, poor hygienic conditions in underdeveloped countries such as the Dominican Republic, where there is also a gender, class, and ethnic gap, complicate the whole process of COVID-19 prevention. Not all households have access to some basic necessities. In the Dominican Republic, 46% of households do not have access to safe drinking water. Only 44.9% receive drinking water at home every 2 or 3 days.

=== Changes in employment during the lockdown ===
In Spain before lockdown, employment rates were higher for men and only 13% of them were unemployed, compared with almost 28.6% of women. About 7% of men and women were left without work during lockdown, while 16.8% of men and 18% of women were dismissed. At the time of the survey, 63.5% of men were working, compared to 45.9% of women.

In the United States 2.5 million women had left the workforce by February 2021, which Vice President Kamala Harris called a "national emergency".

=== Women and Ebola Virus ===
This situation has happened during previous sanitary crises such as the Ebola crisis. The restrictions as well as the strict quarantines significantly reduce the working activity of many women, which has caused a rise of poverty and bad living conditions.

Sanitary crises constitute an obstacle for the realization of everyday tasks, especially in underdeveloped countries. This fact was visible during the Ebola pandemic in Liberia, a country in which 85% of all daily market traders are women who were unable to make profit because of the travel restrictions. Working in an informal economy means depending on social interaction and public gathering, something that has been nearly prohibited during the actual sanitary crisis.

According to a report by the International Labour Organization (ILO), women have been greater affected by the COVID-19 pandemic that men. The sanitary crisis has caused an economic impact on women that implied a 30% reduction in business activities.

Wages have decreased or even stagnated in two-third of the countries. In the remaining ones, there was a growth in average wages because of the loss of low-income jobs. Wages decreased by 8.1% in the case of women and only by 5.4% in the case of men.

=== Global Gender Inequality ===
The earnings gap globally between men and women is at 16%, though in many countries it may rise to 35%. This reality of inequality has been intensified due to the current sanitary crisis. Moreover, women can have an outsized impact on economic recovery, particularly in low- and middle-income countries. World Bank research, for instance, shows Niger's per capita GDP could be more than 25% larger if gender inequality were reduced. The glass ceiling is not the only barrier for women that has grown thicker during the COVID pandemic. If the difficulties of access to health, education and employment are severe due to the COVID pandemic and the measures imposed by governments, the effects are amplified in situations of conflict and violence in developing countries.

== Impact on sexuality ==
Relationships and sexuality have seen multiple types of impacts during the pandemic. Reasons for this change are various. With children staying at home for longer than usual, couples may experience more problems in their relationship due to stress.

The internet has continued to play a big role in this crisis. Many couples who do not live together have the possibility to "meet" via voice call or SMS and studies have shown an increase in sexting during the pandemic.

The use of sex toys has also increased. One Australian study indicates that more than half of the people studied have had less sex during lockdown. 14% declared having used more sex toys than before.

Another study in Spain shows that the confinement in Spain has had a bigger impact on women than on men. 37% of women and 29% of men declared an increase in their sexual desire, but 39% of the woman and 34% of the men admitted a decrease.

== Socio-economic impact ==
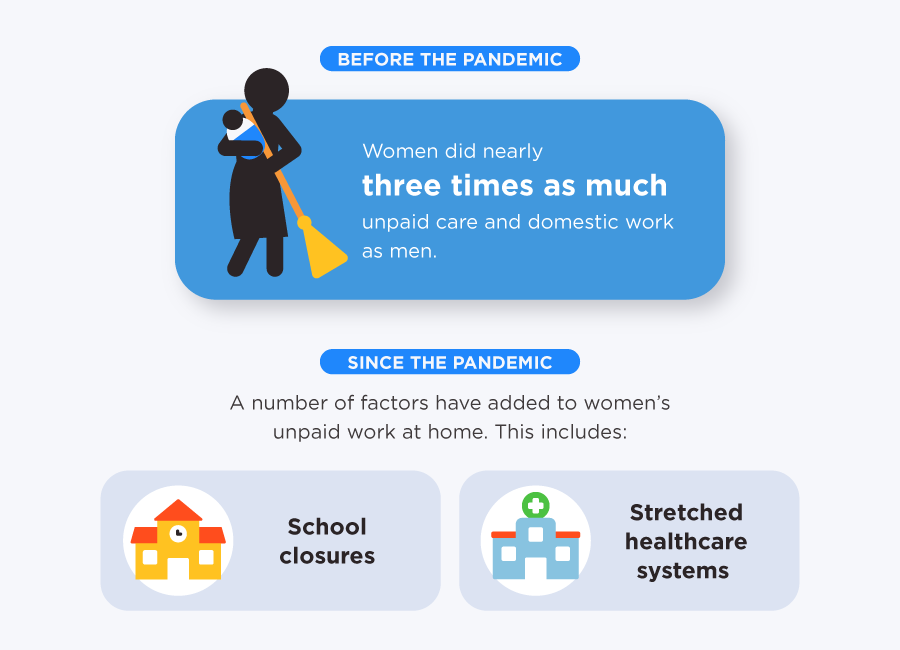
Unpaid work before and since the COVID-19 pandemic started

Women constitute a larger part of informal and part-time workers around the world. During periods of uncertainty, such as during a pandemic, women are at a greater risk of being unemployed and being unable to return to work after the pandemic is over. An analysis of an online survey conducted in the Argentinean city of Mar del Plata on preventive and compulsory social isolation (PCSI) during its second phase for COVID-19 concluded that teleworking was made more difficult for many women because of the clear gender differentiation in unpaid domestic and care work, such as taking care of children or dependants. In this case, it was women, who suffered the most, being overburdened and stressed. Quarantine experience can be different for men and women, considering the difference in physical, cultural, security and sanitary needs for both genders.

In Taiwan, for example, anyone injured, ill, physically or mentally disabled or who dies due to the implementation of measures to combat COVID-19, can receive up to 10 million Taiwan dollars (US$333,333) maximum. Compensation is often done in a single agreement. Additionally, some countries pay a regular salary to healthcare workers caring for people infected with COVID-19.

=== Domestic workers ===
Domestic work is largely dominated by women and has important levels of informality. In particular, migrant domestic workers are in a more vulnerable situation, with unclear immigration status and lack of legal protection. In situations where those migrant domestic workers come from less-developed countries, their families back home are dependent of their remittance to survive in the country of origin of the worker. In Philippines, those remittances account for 9% of their GDP, therefore impacting their country of origin's economy. In Argentina, they have established a unique-payment for all domestic workers, and childcare and elderly care is deemed an essential activity so they are allowed to circulate even with the lock down.

The U.S. Congress included $3.5 billion in grants for childcare providers in the CARES Act in March 2020. However, this is insufficient to sustain most childcare providers who have lost work. The Center for Law And Policy estimated that childcare providers in the United States will need $9.6 billion per month to economically survive the effects of a hypothetical six-month period of reduced activity.

=== Increase in unpaid care work ===
Before the crisis started, women did nearly three times as much unpaid care and domestic work as men, completing 75% of total unpaid care work. Since the start of the pandemic, women in the US have reported spending an additional 1.5 – 2 hours on these increased caregiving responsibilities. Social distancing measures, school closures and overburdened health systems have put an increased demand on women and girls to cater to the basic survival needs of the family and care for the sick and the elderly. With more than 1.5 billion students at home as of March 2020 due to the pandemic, existing gender norms have put the increased demand for unpaid childcare and domestic work on women. This constrains their ability to carry out paid work with 1 in 5 mothers decreasing their working hours to manage this increased demand for childcare and domestic work. The lack of childcare support is particularly problematic for essential workers and lone mothers who have care responsibilities.

Discriminatory social norms are likely to increase the unpaid work load of COVID-19 on girls and adolescent girls, especially those living in poverty or in rural, isolated locations. Evidence from past epidemics shows that adolescent girls are at particular risk of dropping out and not returning to school even after the crisis is over. Women's unpaid care work has long been recognized as a driver of inequality with direct links to wage inequality, lower income, and physical and mental health stressors. As countries rebuild economies, the crisis might offer an opportunity to recognize, reduce and redistribute unpaid care work once and for all. More recently, the European Commission has released a Gender Equality Strategy which aims to promote a more balanced division in this unpaid care work. For example, one area is focused on increasing accessibility and availability to childcare to reduce the burden of this care work.

== Gender based violence ==
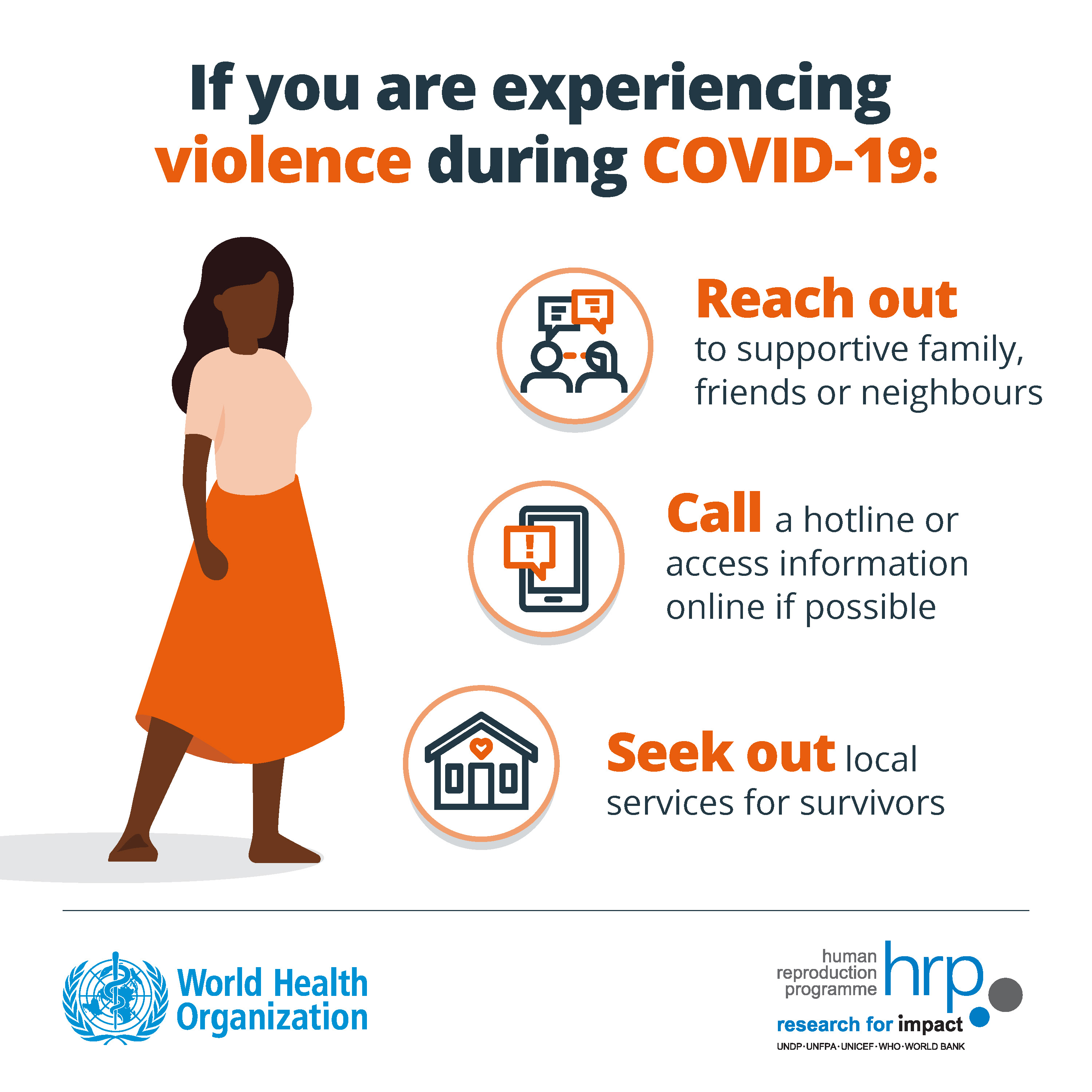
A poster from the World Health Organization on measures that can be taken by victims of domestic violence

Due to increased tension in the household during a pandemic, women and girls are likely to experience higher risk of intimate partner violence and other forms of domestic violence. In Kosovo, there has been a 17% increase in gender based violence during the pandemic. During periods of lockdown, women experiencing domestic violence have limited access to protective services. In Sint Maarten, the sale of alcohol was temporarily halted to prevent more domestic violence from occurring. In developing countries, other forms of violence, such as arranged and forced marriages, have increased along with an aggravation of marital violence, paralleling the resurgence and increased frequency of practices such as female genital mutilation. UN Women provides access to these issues and supports programs to combat gender-based violence. During the COVID-19 pandemic, UN Women is working to prevent violence and facilitate access to essential services, such as health services, hotlines for those experiencing domestic violence. Therefore, UN Women shares some ways in which people can help these women and girls, such as by donating, by sharing news on social media or by subscribing electronically to stay up to date with UN Women's news.

More than 70% of ICN associations have documented cases of violence or discrimination against health workers on the front lines of the fight against COVID-19. Retaliation has been observed within communities after false reports that healthcare workers carry and spread the virus. In particular, a growing number of attacks against nurses in Mexico have been reported: for example, a nurse was doused with bleach on the street, the homes and vehicles of health workers were burned and they were physically assaulted.

=== Gender based violence in terms of migration ===
The United Nations High Commissioner for Refugees (UNHCR) expressed its worries, in the International Women's Day, about how COVID-19 pandemic is impacting on lives and rights of refugees, migrants and stateless women and girls.

Cases of violence against women, domestic violence, forced marriage and children exploitation increased because of the impact COVID-19 pandemic.

Regarding violence, forced marriages and sexual exploitation of migrant and refugee women, Gillian Triggs, Under-Secretary-General of the United Nations, stated that the effects of the pandemic are also devastating for girls as they are forced to leave their education to work, be sold or forced into marriage. A total of 13 million girls are at risk of forced marriage as a result of the pandemic.

Socioeconomic pressure, prior to pandemic and worsened during COVID-19, affects migrant women and girls in a context of extreme poverty, in which they are economically dependent on their abusers, most of the claims have been dismissed due to the women's lack of independence (especially economic). As a result, the pandemic has destroyed all the efforts and goals achieved in recent years in terms of equity between men and women.

== Equitable participation ==
Including women in economic and social life is a must: when women are involved in the process of reaching a peace agreement, they have a better chance of success.This applies to women's participation in formal high-level mediation procedures, as members of delegations, mediators and consultants. There is a need to increase support for women and promote their activities to resolve conflicts and promote peace. They will be of great help in this historic moment and their collaboration will be essential to finally get us out of the coronavirus crisis.

== Opposition parties, speech strategies, March4Women and COVID-19 in Spain ==
As in many other countries as UK, Italy or France; in Spain is also celebrated the March4Women day on 8 March with the objective of defending the women's rights and the gender equality as well as the feminist movement. In Spain, on 13 March 2020, the Spanish president, Pedro Sánchez, ruled the State of Alarm and the lockdown in the entire country through the Royal Decree 423/2020. Related to the March4Women demonstrations that had had place the previous week and the COVID-19 pandemic, the main parties of the Spanish opposition as VOX, PP and Ciudadanos, started a list of strategies to reduce the strength of the Spanish government on social media, in the Congress of Deputies, specially against Pedro Sánchez and Pablo Iglesias Turrión. In particular, the extreme right wing party, VOX, its president Santiago Abascal and other members of the party as Macarena Olona (specially on Twitter), started some strategies against the government to discredit them and the feminism also in relation with COVID-19 pandemic and the recent demonstrations. The strategies used on Twitter are below:

- Publications and content to discredit and to blame the March4Women day because of the COVID-19 pandemic and the relation between it, the demonstrations, and the increase of the COVID-19 cases in the country.
- Content to discredit and to humiliate the feminist movement, the demonstrations, and women in general. Santiago Abascal also in the Congress of the Deputies give speeches against feminism and government. For example: he asked Pedro Sánchez to resign as president due to this problem.
- Speech and content about the change of the gender's violence law by their own law (a law created for the entire society, not only for women and created by them).
- Content, publications and, speeches (also in the Congress of Deputies) to nurture the social controversies and trying to divide the society by the discrediting of the feminist movement, the gender equality and the women who defend the movement and the ideas of feminism and women.

== Women's groups in risk situations in the American continent according to the CIM and the OEA ==
The CIM is the main forum that generates policies to promote the women's rights and the gender equality from North America to South America. It was created in 1928 and it is the first intergovernmental body established for the only purpose of promoting the women's rights and equality. The OAS is the American States Organization that gather occidental hemisphere countries to promote the democracy, the human rights, to encourage the economic develop, the peace, the security, the cooperation and, overall, to advance to get common objectives.

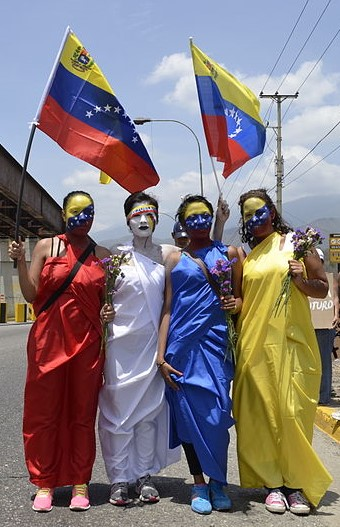
Venezuelan women

Women's groups in risk situation related to the COVID-19 pandemic:

- Migrant women: refugees or displaced women that have any emergency or problem in their countries run the risk of not to have access to the essential sanitary services. An example is the migration is the migration in Venezuela. Currently, there are more than 5,4 millions of migrants that are Venezuelan citizens.
- People belonging to the LGTB group: this women's group can suffer discrimination because of their sexual nature when it comes to access to the health services as hospital, drug stores, etc. This is important because of the current COVID-19 pandemic.
- Homeless women or bad conditions homes: this women's group will not have the enough sanitary conditions for life (houses with any resources to clean them up, for example). It is also possible that many women (or many people) live in the same house, so this is an overcrowding situation.
- Women/children who live conflict situations in their countries: as it happens with the first group, it happens with this one. The only difference is that the first group migrate from the country to another, and this group of women will stay in their countries. This group will have very difficult the access to the health services or even food and water.
