= Men Who Hate Women (Bates book) =

2020 nonfiction book written by Laura Bates

- Author: Laura Bates
- Language: English
- Genre: Nonfiction
- Publisher: Simon & Schuster
- Publication date: 2020
- Publication place: United Kingdom
- ISBN: 9781471194337

Men Who Hate Women: From Incels to Pickup Artists: The Truth about Extreme Misogyny and How it Affects Us All is a 2020 nonfiction book written by Laura Bates.

== Critical reception ==
The Guardian wrote "For this brilliantly fierce and eye-opening book, Bates has descended into the vast underworld sewage system of online misogyny, and brought back a persuasive and alarming thesis. But first she guides the reader through the various hellish circles of what is called the 'manosphere'." Based on her years of experience navigating the online world of misogyny and incels, Bates' Men Who Hate Women explores society’s underlying bias and violence against women.

NPR called Men Who Hate Women "an often harrowing read; an uncompromising guide to the misogynistic backlash of the past decade or so."
