= Emer O'Toole =

Irish academic and writer

- Born: Ireland
- Occupations: Scholar, writer, feminist

Emer O'Toole is an Irish researcher and writer who contributes to various online publications, including The Guardian and The Vagenda. She is from the west of Ireland and lives in Montreal, where she is associate professor of Irish performance studies at Concordia University.

== Education and career ==
O'Toole completed a BA in philosophy and English literature at the University of Galway, and then a master of philosophy degree in Irish theater and performance at Trinity College Dublin. She started a PhD at Royal Holloway, University of London, which she completed in 2012. Her dissertation examined the ethics of intercultural theatre practice. She published articles based on this research in journals such as Target and the Journal of Adaptation in Film & Performance.

O'Toole spent a year doing postdoctoral research on the Indigeneity in the Contemporary World project at Royal Holloway. She is currently an associate professor of Performance Studies, at the School of Irish Studies at Concordia University in Montreal. Her research explores the relationship between contemporary Irish performance and activism. She is a regular contributor to newspapers and magazines, such as The Irish Times and The Guardian, writing about feminism and Ireland. She wrote for the feminist magazine The Vagenda, and recites short stories for audio magazine 4'33". She was a fellow of Concordia's Simone de Beauvoir Institute.

In 2012, O'Toole caused an Internet storm when she appeared on a morning talk show and revealed her decision to stop removing her body hair. She discussed the negative responses this often engenders, but stated: "Our bodies should be there for us to enjoy - express ourselves. Instead, there’s a capitalist pressure on us where we are being coerced into buying a service or products, and told if you don’t then you are unhygienic or outdated."

In her first book, Girls Will Be Girls: Dressing Up, Playing Parts, and Daring to Act Differently, O'Toole explores how gender roles are performed. She draws on personal experience as well as academic sources, and has said that she hopes the book makes "Judith Butler's theory of performativity accessible [...] to a wide demographic."

== Personal life ==
O'Toole is bisexual and polyamorous. She and her partner have two children.

== Publications ==
=== Books ===
- Girls Will Be Girls: Dressing Up, Playing Parts, and Daring to Act Differently. London: Orion, 2015
- Ethical Exchanges: Translation, Adaptation and Dramaturgy. Edited with Andrea Kristic Pelegri and Stuart Young. Brill, 2017
- Do It Yourself. Madeira Park, British Columbia: Douglas & McIntyre, 2026

=== Chapters ===
- "Intercultural Adaptation: The Ethics of Peter Brook's 11 & 12." Ethical Exchanges: Translation, Adaptation and Dramaturgy. Eds. Emer O’Toole, Andrea Kristic Pelegri and Stuart Young. Brill, 2017
- "The Eternal Interculture Wars: Reading the Controversy Surrounding Bisis Adigun and Roddy Doyle's Playboy of the Western World." Irish Migrant Adaptations: Memory, Performance and Place. Eds. Jason King, Matthew Spangler and Charlotte McIvor. 2018

Peer-reviewed journal articles

- O'Toole, Emer. 'Panti Bliss Still Can’t Get Hitched: Meditations on Performativity, Drag, & Gay Marriage' Sexualities, 2018
- 'Guerilla Glamour: The Queer Tactics of Dr. Panti Bliss.' Eire-Ireland 52.4, 2017.
- 'Waking the Feminists: Re-imagining the Space of the National Theatre in the Era of the Celtic Phoenix.' Lit: Literature Interpretation Theory 28.2 (2017): 134-152.
- ‘Cultural Capital in Intercultural Theatre: A Study of Pan Pan Theatre Company’s The Playboy of the Western World.’ Target 25.1 ,2013. P. 407- 426.
- ‘Towards Best Intercultural Practice: A Study of Tim Supple’s Pan-Indian A Midsummer Night’s Dream.’ Journal of Adaptation in Film and Performance, 4.3, 2011. P. 289-302
