= The Vagenda =

Defunct feminist online magazine

- Editor: Holly Baxter; Rhiannon Lucy Cosslett
- Categories: Online feminist magazine
- Founded: 2012
- Final issue: Summer 2015
- Country: United Kingdom
- Based in: London
- Language: English
- Website: Vagendamag

The Vagenda was a feminist online magazine launched in January 2012. It used the tagline "Like King Lear, but for girls," taken from Grazia magazine's summary of the film The Iron Lady, a biography of Margaret Thatcher. The Vagenda was run by British journalists Holly Baxter and Rhiannon Lucy Cosslett; it was founded by ten London-based women journalists in their twenties and was then written by a large group of anonymous contributors from all over the world, both women and men. The editors stated: "the women's press is a large hadron collider of bullshit, and something needed to be done". Cosslett described her creation as "a media watchdog with a feminist angle". In its last issue, July 2015, it announced a 'summer hiatus' in publication.

== Background ==
In the first few hours of its launch it had 10,000 hits; in the first 16 days 150,000, accruing 250,000 hits in its first month and approximately eight million in their first year. Contributing journalists also wrote other publications such as The Guardian and the New Statesman. The Vagenda editors say that they were heavily influenced by The Times columnist Caitlin Moran and her best-selling memoir How to Be a Woman. Contributing journalist Natalie Cox commented that she hoped it would become an "online feminist Private Eye". The New Statesman described the magazine: "humorous and topical with a searing, critical streak, The Vagenda exposes the mainstream female press for its insidious elements - and its frequent ridiculousness." The Times newspaper featured the magazine in an extended spread in March 2012 and Cosslett featured on BBC Radio 4's Woman's Hour, discussing the launch.

Vagenda editors commented:

A vagenda is a woman with an agenda, or specifically a vagina with an agenda. Today’s media is full of them. Unfortunately, more often than not, these vagendas are not your friend - particularly in the context of women’s fashion and lifestyle magazines, which, quite frankly, have come to constitute one of the most underhanded instances of woman-on-woman crime. Fact is: Vogue has a vagenda, Cosmo has a vagenda, and even American teen mag Seventeen has a vagenda - and the vibe in there is not friendly... The fact is that women's magazines nowadays constitute a minefield of body fascism. When you flick through one ("read" is probably too strong a word for the image-and-Tweetspeak-heavy content on offer), you're always dodging another insecurity explosion. Whether it's Rihanna's 25-minute underwear workout (yes, it’s a real thing) or snake venom infused lip-gloss, the underlying message throughout is that you are your body, and your body isn't good enough.

== Book ==
In September 2012, the publisher Square Peg, owned by the Random House group (Vintage Press), outbid 12 competitors to win rights to a book by the two editors of The Vagenda. A six-figure deal was agreed, with a view to a book release in 2013, in the UK. It was pitched in The Bookseller as a "(wo)manifesto, exploring some of the most popular themes and topics in greater depth but with their customary humour, insight and irreverence, not to mention wonderful writing".

The book was released in the spring of 2014 and was widely reviewed, often in tandem with the first book by another young British blogger, Everyday Sexism by Laura Bates.

The site attracted criticism when it emerged that blog contributors had complained of not being fully credited. Germaine Greer, writing in the New Statesman, claimed "Baxter and Cosslett took a leaf out of the golden notebook of Arianna Huffington when they accepted submissions to their blog and published them without payment or full credit (the Vagenda’s policy is to include the author’s initials but not their full name) ... The six figure advance paid for the book will presumably not be shared with those who helped to build the brand."

Rachel Cooke in The Observer criticised the book as "grotesquely mannered, woefully researched and bizarrely dated ... The Vagenda achieves the rare feat of patronising the very people it purports to support." Zoe Williams in The Guardian claimed that "the fact-checking is extremely uneven. It is often difficult to tell the difference between their comical hyperbole and examples of things that happened in print; these distinctions are important if you want to make a dent in an industry ... you cannot on the one hand accuse outlets such as the Daily Mail of poisoning women's relationship with themselves, while on the other using exactly their tactics – distortion, exaggeration, poor footnoting – to petrify people in the other direction." Germaine Greer's review in the New Statesman claimed that some of the book's writing on sex contained "a level of ignorance that is positively medieval". Helen Rumbelow in The Times had a more generous appraisal, writing that "they are pitched so squarely at the internet generation I think Germaine Greer wouldn’t even have the vocabulary to know what they are on about". She added: "It’s a book written as a gift for a teenage girl in an age that has long been confusing ... It’s unfair of us to ask too much of The Vagenda – to unravel the deeper causes of female insecurity, for instance, or to solve anything. They’re just trying to be good mates to those who come after them, and make them laugh".

Cosslett countered the criticism in a blog post, writing that "Much of this criticism (well, what which didn’t come from journalists who completely coincidentally ALSO WRITE FOR WOMEN’S MAGAZINES) came from middle class women in their late middle age who were lucky enough to have benefited from much feminist consciousness-raising when they were attending their progressive Russell Group Universities – talk to a state school educated girl who grew up in the feminist vacuum of the nineties (hiya!) and it is, of course, a different story." Baxter and Cosslett also addressed the criticisms in an article in the New Statesman, writing that: "vocally criticising the women’s magazine industry has not been an easy ride, and the media has not always been receptive. Perhaps it is because those who are already comfortably ensconced within a narrative are just not that interested in challenging the assumptions that potentially contradict it. Or perhaps it is because an older generation of journalists don’t quite realise just how absent feminism’s challenging of stereotypical gender roles has been from the lives of the younger generation.".

Author Jeanette Winterson selected the book as one of her 2014 holiday reads, saying "The Vagenda... is a brilliant exposé of women's mags and marketing – laugh-out-loud and painfully funny. This gives me hope for women and for feminism and for fun".

The site raised money for a relaunch after the book deal through Kickstarter, a decision that was criticised following Holly Baxter's December 2013 article in The Guardian appeared to suggest that musician Dev Hynes should not receive donations following a house fire that destroyed his studio and in which his dog died, in which she called it an "undignified charity case."
