= 2018 Chilean feminist protests and strikes =

The 2018 Chilean feminist protests and strikes is mass protests and unrest, rallies, demonstrations and marches against the government and violence against women in Chile. The protests took place in 2018.

== Overview ==
The 2018 feminist demonstrations in Chile, also nicknamed the Chilean feminist wave or the Chilean feminist revolution, correspond to a series of demonstrations and mobilizations in Chile in 2018. These demonstrations demanded a process of social change to eradicate—from the feminist point of view—the prevailing machismo and the patriarchal system that has been structural in that country, with a view to guiding the Chilean State towards the pillars of feminism. These premises are based on denouncing the situation of inequality in which women find themselves, criticizing the widespread education and making gender issues visible, including repeated harassment and abuse throughout the country's history.

The 2018 feminist student mobilization in Chile, also known as the feminist tomas de 2018 or the New Chilean feminist wave, corresponds to a series of demonstrations carried out by university and high school students from Chile that began in April 2018. The movement's demands include taking measures against academics accused of abuse, eliminating abuse from education, making changes to the curriculum, and training on gender equality among other issues.

Between 2012 and 2017, there was an average of 19 feminist protest events per year. In 2018, there were 151 feminist protests throughout the country, with the majority occurring in the capital, Santiago. The majority of protests occurred between May and June 2018. According to a Cadem survey taken in July 2018, 55% of Chileans approved of the marches while only 37% approved of the student protests.

According to scholar Sergio Martinez, the feminist agenda in Chile has focused on the unstable employment situation for women. This includes the pay gap for women, along with the expectation that women provide domestic and care work without pay. Lawsuits were filed against the government to provide young people with an education that is not sexist. Another demand was for work and study places to be safe and free from gender-based harassment.

== Causes ==
=== Causes for demonstrations ===
The mobilization had been developing at first due to the international context. The "Ni Una Menos" and Me Too movements arrived in Chile and, based on the case of Nabila Rifo, generated marches in Santiago in November 2016 and March and October 2017 demanding an end to violence against women. The matter was exacerbated when in April 2018 there were massive complaints of harassment and abuse against teachers and students in different universities in the country, which in the face of deficient processes and lacking response, motivated takeovers and stoppages that by June 2018 already added to 32 universities, producing a massive feminist student mobilization throughout the country.

Along with these events, various television and theater actresses began in April 2018 to report cases of harassment and abuse by the renowned television director Herval Abreu, which generated in Chile a phenomenon similar to the Weinstein Effect in the United States, where various public figures came out with the banner of feminism to denounce these situations. Other actresses, for their part, decided to make public the large wage gap between men and women that has not changed to date. According to renowned historians and sociologists, such as María José Cumplido, María Emilia Tijoux and Teresa Valdés, it would be the largest feminist rebellion in the history of the country, as well as the consecration of the third feminist wave in Chile. The Plaza Pública de Cadem showed that there was a majority supporting the mobilizations: 68% of those surveyed were in favor of feminist mobilizations and 69% in favor of women's marches on public roads.

=== Causes for student demonstrations ===
One cause for the protests was the case against law professor Carlos Carmona, who taught at the University of Chile. In August 2017, a student who worked as an assistant to Carmona accused him of assault. The University of Chile made the student's statements public and suspended Professor Carmona for three days. Other professors advocated for a union between students and teachers to resolve this issue. Carmona resigned from his position as a tenured professor in 2018. The mobilisation had been developing at first due to the international context. The Ni una menos and Me Too movements arrived in Chile and, based on the case of Nabila Riffo, generated marches in Santiago in November 2016 and March and October 2017 demanding an end to violence against women. The matter was exacerbated when in April 2018 there were massive complaints of harassment and abuse against teachers and students in different universities in the country, which in the face of deficient processes and lacking response, motivated takeovers and stoppages that by June 2018 already added to 32 universities, producing a massive feminist student mobilisation throughout the country.

A study measuring sexual violence victimization at Pontifica Universidad Catolica de Chile (PUC) was conducted in April 2018. They found that women were likely to be victimized more than men, with 22% of women and 10% of men. Most cases had men as perpetrators (89%) and were known to the victim (72%) either as a partner or friend. They concluded from this study that those with a sexual interest in men were at higher risk than those with no interest. This study found that most victims confided in friends or family, with only 3% of victims reporting to the university. Also, two-thirds of students who reported their experience to the university were unsatisfied with the support they received.

== Protest activities ==
Slogans used by the protestors included "Cuidado! El Machismo Mata!" translated to "Careful! Machismo Kills!" Recently they have used "Ni Una Menos" to protest violence against women, including femicide and slow judicial responses.

Women used posters, canvases, costumes, songs, and stagings in major plazas and roadways. Researcher Sergio Martinez used fieldwork from the protests in Santiago to describe the nature of the protests. Most of the signs listed demands and focused on sexual violence and freedom of expression. Some said "I want to walk home without fear", "This body is mine", "We don't want power over men, but power over ourselves". Many posters also demand recognition for domestic and reproductive work. Other posters mentioned the sexist education and cases of abuse that take place in the schooling system.

The mood set by the protestors serves different purposes. The joyful dancing and games is a way for women to claim joy in the face of fear and violence. The songs they sing express their frustration with the judicial system, claiming "They kill us and assault us and no one does anything" from one protest song heard. Another form of protest is to honor the victims of femicide by recreating wakes and telling the stories of victims. One demonstration used burned pieces of cloth to represent victims, and installed them on a large canvas. In an effort to reclaim control over their bodies, one protest of women marched with their faces covered and their torsos uncovered.

== Reactions ==
=== University reactions ===
The protests at the University of Chile led the institution to review its protocols for sexual harassment and violence. The Ministry of Education has established a working group to discuss these issues.

In early May, student protests ceased because feminist student organizations were negotiating with their universities. In 2018, twelve women and five men won presidential elections to university boards. This includes the election of the first transgender woman to the Student Federation of the University of Chile.

=== Government reactions ===
In January 2018, the Juliet Kirkwood Feminist Bank was founded to promote bills on gender equality. This group responded to the student protests by advocating for a permanent commission for Women and Gender Equity.

President Piñera signed a constitutional reform on May 28, 2018, which confirmed equal rights between men and women. Critics of this reform claim that the definitions of "violence, abuse, and harassment" are too ambiguous. He also introduced a Gender Equality Agenda in May 2018 which focused on gender violence and women in the workforce.

== Gallery ==
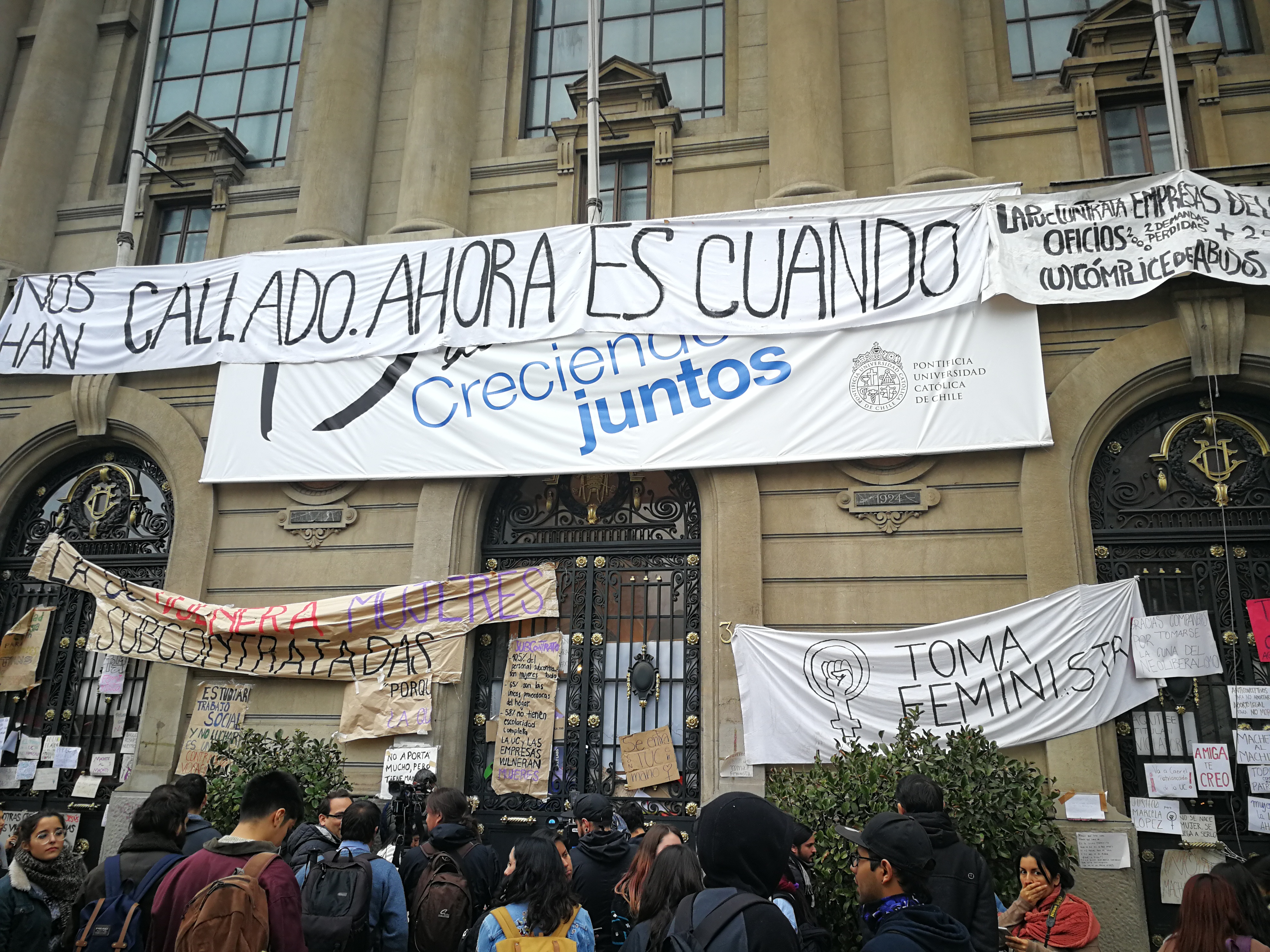

== See also ==
- 2011–2013 Chilean student protests
- 2006 student protests in Chile
