= R/Feminism =

Feminist subreddit

- The feminism symbol is used as the logo for the subreddit
- Website type: Subreddit
- Website: https://www.reddit.com/r/Feminism/
- Commercial: yes
- Users: ~321,000 As of August 2025
- Launched: January 10, 2009; 17 years ago

r/Feminism is a feminist political subreddit discussing women's issues. The subreddit discusses issues that impact women and minorities, including workplace abuse and harassment, rape, domestic abuse, pink tax, cultural appropriation, and representation. Users of r/feminism are similar to the users of r/MensLib, a men's liberation subreddit; and r/againstmensrights, a subreddit against r/MensRights. The subreddit sends people wanting to talk about men's issues to r/Masculism, which has been described as a "a comparably essentialist approach to feminism". About 54% of posts on r/Feminism are predominantly negative.

== Research ==
In a survey of non–feminists in the subreddit in 2018, non–feminists said that they wanted to disrupt the community. Feminists in the subreddit have noted a level of anti–feminists in the comments. In the first quarter of 2020, about a thousand members were banned from the subreddit per month. Due to disruption, it can be difficult to differentiate good-faith and bad-faith, and feminists within the subreddit may feel uncomfortable voicing their opinions due to negative reactions by other feminists.

A study of news reports of the People v. Turner on Reddit, comparing r/News, r/Feminism, and r/MensRights found that r/Feminism was the only subreddit to call Turner an "offender". r/Feminism was the only subreddit that linked to external webpages using the words "crime" or "rapist", indicating that r/feminism had a much stronger view on Turner than the other subreddits. 30% of the posts in r/feminism would reword news articles about the case, and 62.5% in r/MensRights. When comparing r/Feminism and r/MensRights, the feminist subreddit was likely to link to progressive websites, and r/MensRights were likely to link to conservative websites, meaning that both of the subreddits preferred sources which agreed with their beliefs.

Users on r/Feminism have an average of 5 posts, and 0.86% of members have made over 100 posts. A 2023 study in the Discourse & Society journal looking at 496 thousand posts on r/Feminism found that 54.31% of posts on r/Feminism are predominantly negative.

A 2020 study suggested that users of r/Feminism are similar to r/MensLib. A November 2023 study in the Behavior Research Methods journal concluded that this is not due to random chance. The study also looked at r/MensRights, and wrote that "our results show that there is some evidence that r/MensLib shares more information in common with r/Feminism (and vice versa) than either do with r/MensRights. This provides good evidence that content from r/MensRights is conceptually more similar, and thus more closely converges with, rhetoric espoused by other feminist groups than rhetoric espoused by other groups within the manosphere."
