= Rhiannon Lucy Cosslett =

British journalist and writer

Rhiannon Lucy Cosslett is a British journalist and writer.

== Biography ==
Cosslett was born in London, raised in Wales, and has lived in France and Italy; she now lives in North London. She won the 2011 Guardian Student Media award for columnist of the year. She co-founded and edited the feminist blog The Vagenda. She is a columnist for The Guardian and writes for Vogue, Elle and The Independent.

== Works ==
- The Vagenda: A Zero Tolerance Guide to the Media (with Holly Baxter), Random House, 2014. ISBN 978-1-4481-6172-0
- The Tyranny of Lost Things, Sandstone Press, 2018. ISBN 978-1-912240-14-2
- The Year of the Cat, Headline, 2023. ISBN 978-1-4722-9072-4
- The Republic of Parenthood: On Bringing Up Babies, September Publishing, 2025. ISBN 978-0-7156-5585-6
- Female, Nude, Headline, 2026. ISBN 978-1-03-541382-9
