= March4Women =

Gender equality campaign

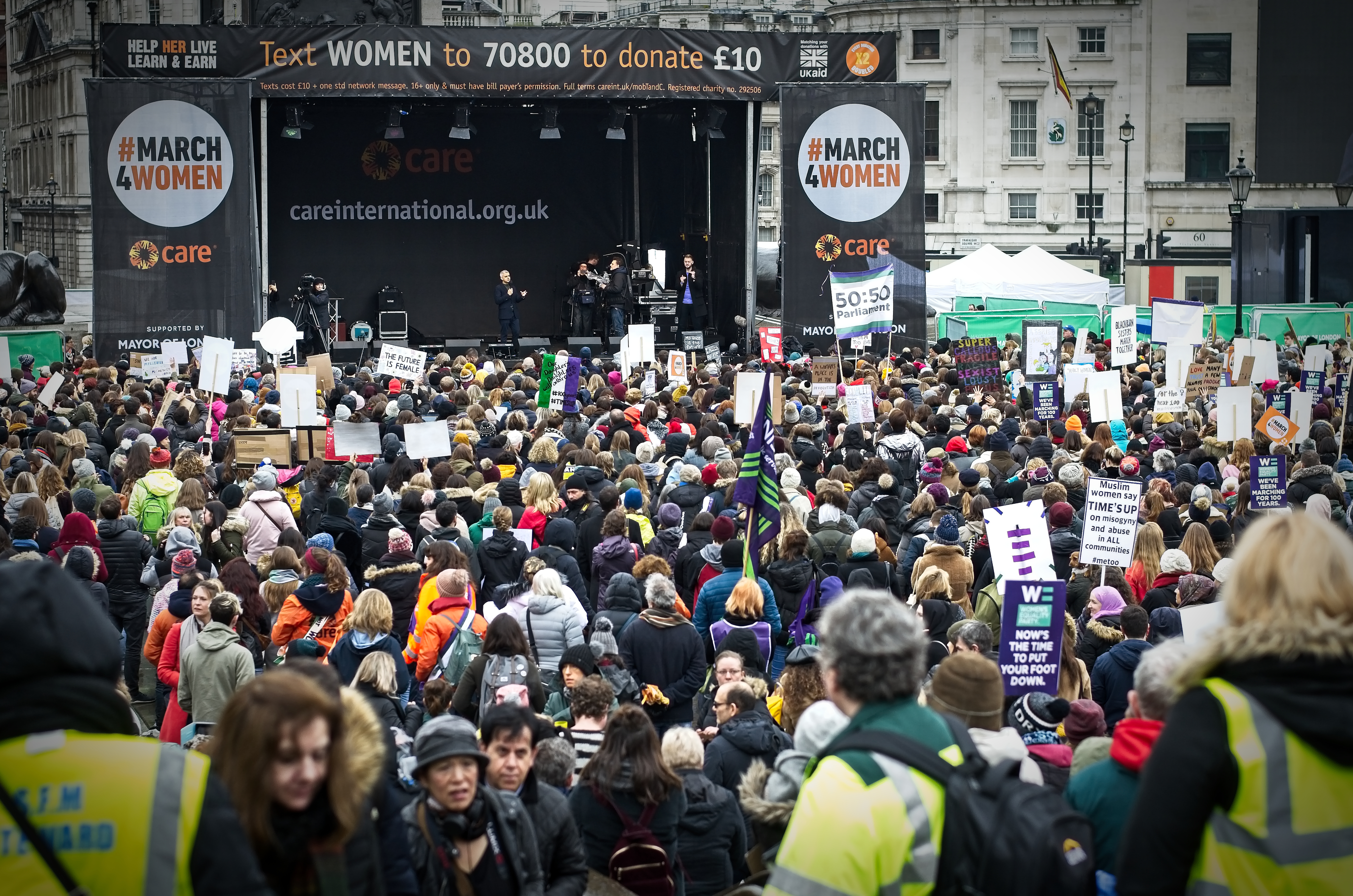
2018's March4Women

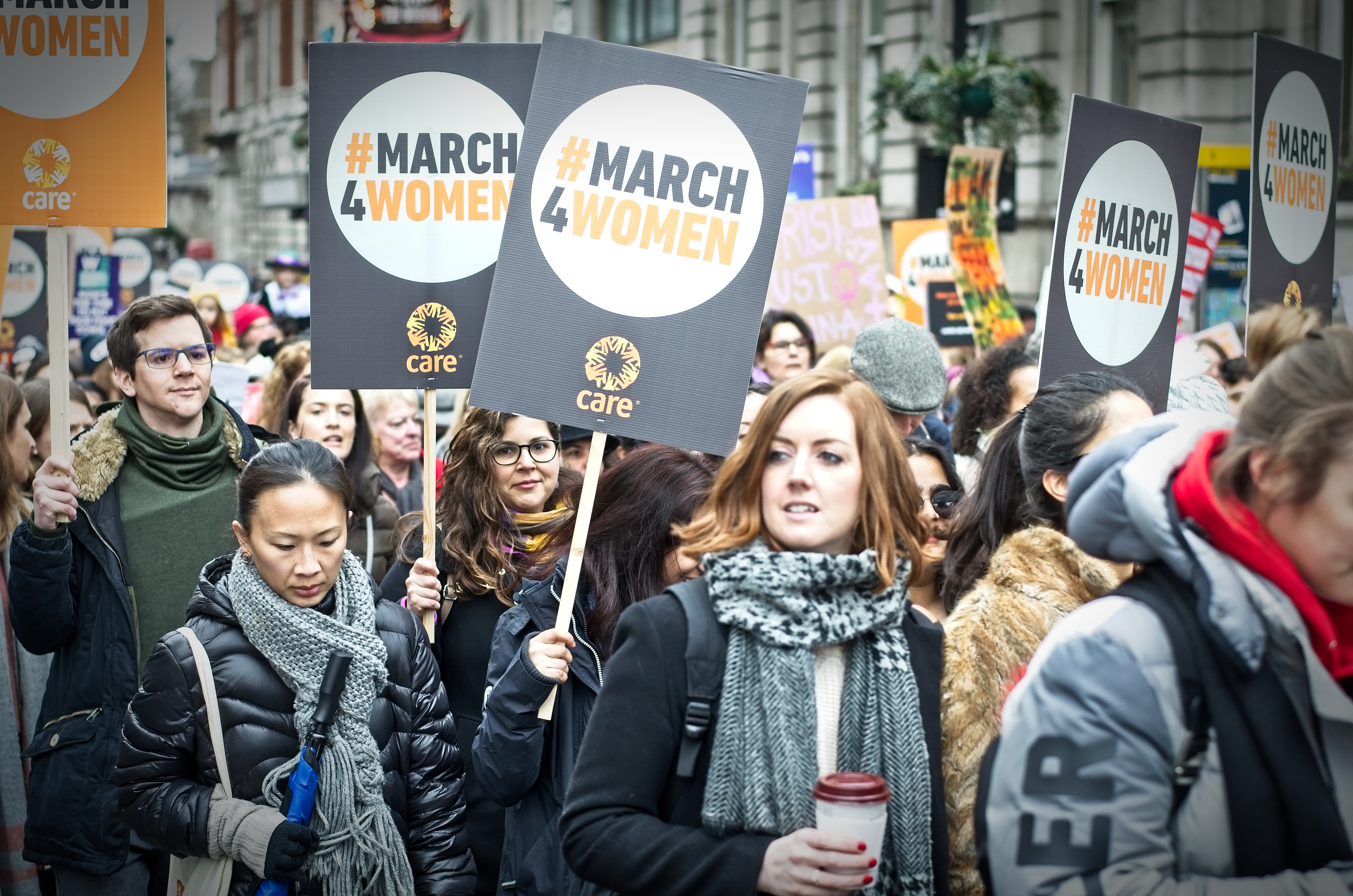
Attendees at the March (2018)

March4Women is a global movement and campaign for gender equality run by the international development charity CARE International. Since 2011, thousands of people have joined an annual march in central London held on or near International Women's Day on 8 March.

== Themes and history ==
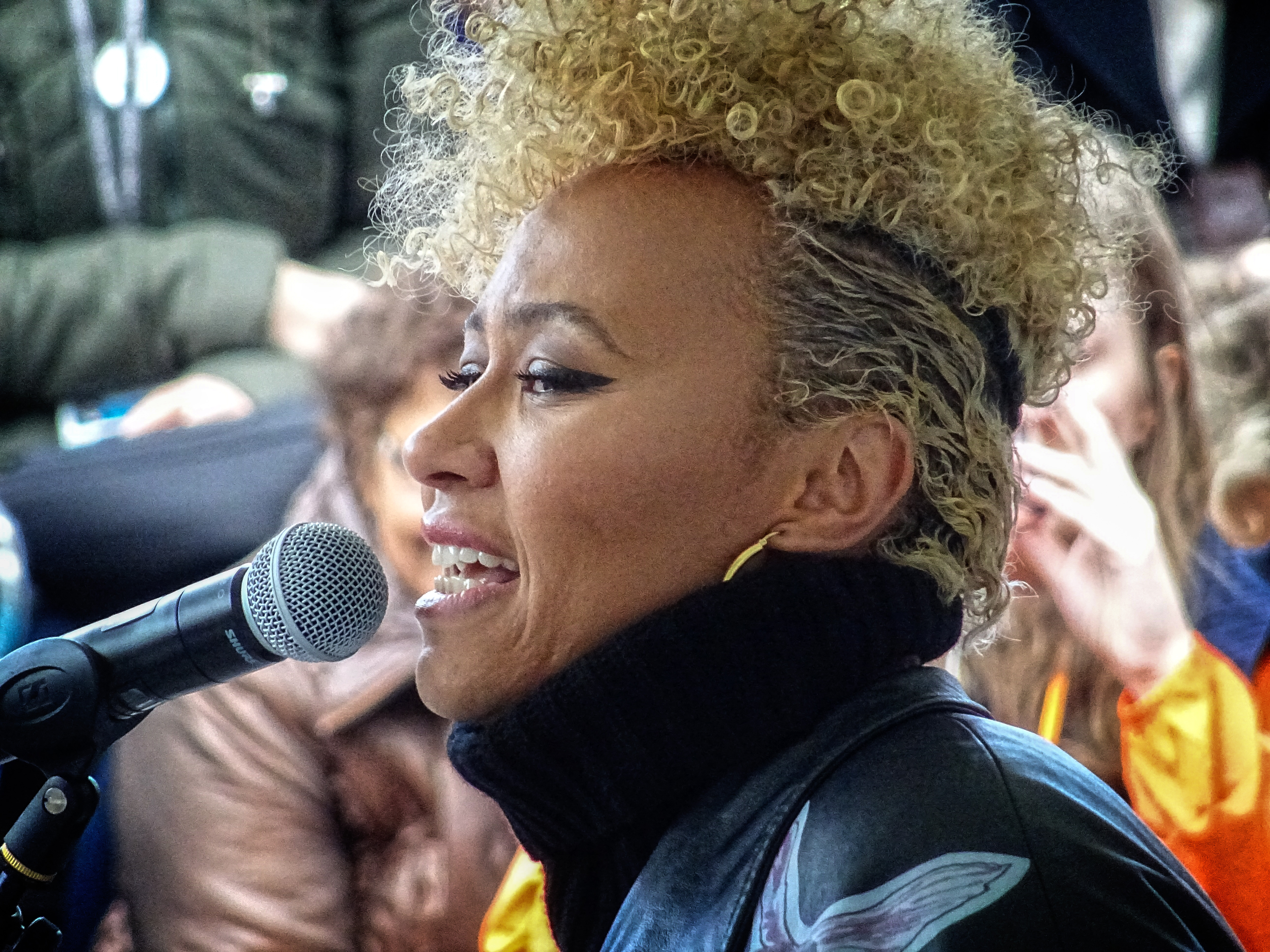
Emelie Sande performing at March4Women

=== 2021 - Stop telling half the story ===
The 2021 event was a remote event due to the COVID-19 pandemic; participants included actress Helena Bonham Carter and actor Stephen Fry.

=== 2020 - There is no climate justice without gender justice ===
2020's theme focused on the gendered impact of the climate emergency. The theme highlighted how women are often at the forefront of the battle against climate change, whilst also most vulnerable to its impact.

Attendees included actresses Natalie Dormer and Nicola Coughlan, singer Emeli Sandé, Mayor of London Sadiq Khan, singer Ricky Wilson and actor George MacKay plus Labour MP Jeremy Corbyn.

=== 2019 ===
In 2019, the campaign celebrated the centenary anniversary of women being able to become lawyers and advocated for the UK government to sign into law a global convention to protect workers from workplace harassment.

Attendees included Bonham Carter, actor David Tennant, jurist Lady Hale, actress Nicola Thorp, activist Gina Martin, singer-songwriter Annie Lennox, singer and actress Beverley Knight and singer Imelda May.

=== 2018 ===
Theresa May, then British Prime Minister, tweeted support to participants in the 2018 march. March attendees included broadcaster and co-founder of the Women's Equality Party, Sandi Toksvig, Labour MP Dawn Butler, and singer Natalie Imbruglia.
