= Everyday Sexism Project =

Website by Laura Bates

- Website type: User-generated content
- Available in: At the discretion of the poster
- Owner: Laura Bates
- Creator: Laura Bates
- Website: everydaysexism.com
- Commercial: No
- Registration: None, and posters may use a pseudonym
- Users: Over 50,000
- Launched: 16 April 2012; 14 years ago
- Current status: Online
- Content license: Hosted by Blueshot Inc
- Some of the stories have been collated into a book - Everyday sexism by Laura Bates.

The Everyday Sexism Project is a website founded in 2012 by Laura Bates, a British feminist writer. Its aim is to document sexism from around the world.

== History ==
After graduating from Cambridge University with a degree in English Literature, Bates worked as a nanny and found that the young girls she looked after were already preoccupied with their body image. She set up the Everyday Sexism Project in April 2012 after finding it difficult to speak out about sexism. Everyday sexism can be defined as daily interactions between people that play into stereotypes of gender. These interactions can range from small infractions to large, unmissable demonstrations of sexism. It is common for incidents of everyday sexism to go unnoticed and unmentioned.

Entries may be submitted directly to the site, or by email or tweet. Additionally, users have the option to insert their name into the entry or use a pseudonym if they prefer. The accounts of abuse are collated by a small group of volunteer researchers that operate on a rotational schedule. These researchers are coordinated by Emer O'Toole.

Nearly a year after beginning the website, Bates reflected on the common response she had received. "Again and again, people told me sexism is no longer a problem – that women are equal now, more or less, and if you can’t take a joke or take a compliment, then you need to stop being so 'frigid' and get a sense of humor," she said in April 2013. "Even if I couldn’t solve the problem right away, I was determined that nobody should be able to tell us we couldn’t talk about it anymore."

At the time of the 2012 foundation of the Everyday Sexism website, Bates had "hoped to gather 100 women's stories," but a year after the launch she wrote that it had grown very rapidly. Today, this project has been made available to 25 countries around the world.

The Financial Times journalist Lucy Kellaway said of herself, after encountering Bates and the project in the summer of 2014, the project affected her "in a way that the writings of Camille Paglia, Natasha Walter or Naomi Wolf never have. For the first time since the 1970s, I find myself cross on behalf of women, and rather inclined to take up cudgels. What has swayed me are not statistics or arguments but real stories of sexism. So far she has collected more than 60,000 of them, which sit there online, hard to ignore or dismiss."

Bates was named as one of Britain's most influential women in the BBC Woman's Hour Power List 2014.

== Legacy ==
Two years after the launch of the Everyday Sexism Project in 2012, Laura Bates published a book that compiled entries received from those two years entitled Everyday Sexism. The book uses a case-based format and its organization is structured on the common themes found within the entries. Some reviews of this book viewed the book as a strong backing for modern feminism. Some critics believe that this book offered no advancement of modern feminism. One feminist critic has been uncomplimentary. "Simply coughing up outrage into a blog will get us nowhere," wrote Germaine Greer in the New Statesman when she reviewed Bates' book in May 2014. Another critic, Rachel Cooke, said in her review of Everyday Sexism in April 2014, that this book, "is a wasted opportunity: little more than another repository for anger and frustration." Even with mixed reception, Everyday Sexism was named one of the Bookseller's Top 10 Non-Fiction books of the year. It was also shortlisted for the Waterstone's Book of the year award.

== Other activities ==
In January 2014, Everyday Sexism successfully campaigned for the removal of the mobile app Plastic Surgery & Plastic Doctor & Plastic Hospital Office for Barbie Version from the App Store and Google Play, for its promotion of a poor perspective on the concept of body image to those of a young age.

The Everyday Sexism Project has advised British Transport Police on the training of their officers to respond to complaints of unwanted sexual behaviour as part of Project Guardian, an initiative to increase reporting of sexual offences on public transport in London.

Bates said in April 2015: "The entries have been used to work on policy with ministers and members of parliament in multiple countries, to start conversations about consent in schools and universities, to tackle sexual harassment in businesses and workplaces and to help police forces raise the reporting and detection rates on sexual offences."

== See also ==
- Everyday Lesbophobia, website about the negativity and discrimination faced by lesbians
