= Laura Bates =

English feminist writer (born 1986)

Laura Bates BEM FRSL
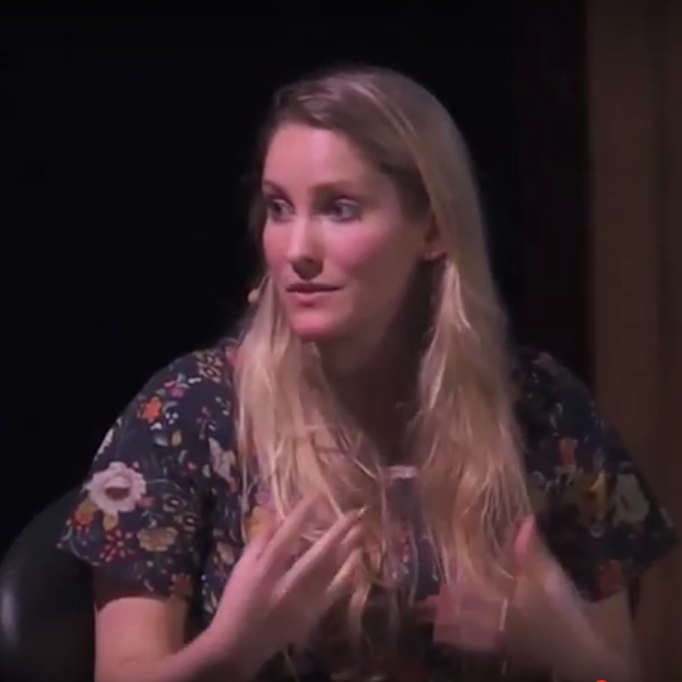
- Bates in 2014
- Born: Laura Carolyn Bates; 27 August 1986 (age 40); Oxford, England
- Education: King's College, Taunton; University of Cambridge
- Spouse: Nick Taylor (m. 2014)
- Writing career
- Subject: Feminism
- Notable works: Everyday Sexism Project; Men Who Hate Women; Fix the System, Not the Women
- Notable awards: British Empire Medal
- Website: www.laurabates.co.uk

Laura Carolyn Bates (born 27 August 1986) is an English feminist writer. She founded the Everyday Sexism Project website in April 2012. Her first book, Everyday Sexism, was published in 2014.

== Education and early life ==
External videos
- Everyday sexism: Laura Bates at TEDxCoventGardenWomen, TEDx Talks, 16:05, 17 January 2014

External videos
- Shouting Back: Laura Bates, Caroline Criado-Perez and Samira Ahmed at Conway Hall 19:30, 9 October 2014

Bates' parents are Diane Elizabeth Bates, a French language teacher, and Adrian Keith Bates, a physician. She grew up in the London Borough of Hackney and Taunton, and has an older sister and a younger brother. Her parents divorced when Bates was in her twenties. She was privately educated at King's College, Taunton, and subsequently studied English literature at University of Cambridge where she was an undergraduate student at St John's College and graduated in 2007.

== Career ==
After graduating, Bates remained in Cambridge for two and a half years as a researcher for psychologist Susan Quilliam, who was working on an updated edition of The Joy of Sex. Bates then worked as an actor and a nanny, a period during which she has said she experienced sexism at auditions and found the young girls she was caring for were already preoccupied with their body image.

The Everyday Sexism Project website was founded in 2012. Around the third anniversary of the website, in April 2015, Everyday Sexism had reached 100,000 entries. Bates' first book Everyday Sexism, based on the project, was published by the London subsidiary of Simon & Schuster in 2014.

After Everyday Sexism, Bates published several more books about sexism. Bates has said that she has faced abuse online in relation to these projects. After her publication of Men Who Hate Women in 2020, Bates said she received deepfake pornography images of herself performing sexual acts on the sender.

Bates is a contributor to The Guardian, The Independent, the Financial Times, and other publications. She is a contributor to the New York–based Women Under Siege Project.

== Honours and awards ==
- 2013: Cosmopolitan Ultimate New Feminist
- 2014: BBC 100 Women
- 2015: British Empire Medal
- 2018: Fellow of the Royal Society of Literature
- 2020: Honorary Fellow of St John's College, Cambridge
- 2022: Evening Standard "London women changing the world"
- 2024: Honorary doctorate from Anglia Ruskin University

== Publications ==
- Everyday Sexism: The Project That Inspired a Worldwide Movement. London: Simon & Schuster. 2014. ISBN 978-1-4711-3157-8.
- Girl Up: Kick Ass, Claim Your Woman Card, and Crush Everyday Sexism. Simon & Schuster. 2016. ISBN 978-1-4711-4950-4.
- Misogynation: The True Scale of Sexism. London: Simon & Schuster. 2018. ISBN 978-1-4711-6924-3.
- The Burning. New York: Simon & Schuster. 2019. ISBN 978-1-4711-7020-1.
- Men Who Hate Women: From Incels to Pickup Artists, the Truth About Extreme Misogyny and How It Affects Us All. London: Simon & Schuster. 2020. ISBN 978-1-4711-9433-7.
- Fix the System, Not the Women. London: Simon & Schuster. 2022. ISBN 978-1-3985-1433-1.
- Sisters of Sword and Shadow. New York: Simon & Schuster. 2023. ISBN 978-1-3985-2004-2.
- Sisters of Fire and Fury. New York: Simon & Schuster. 2024. ISBN 978-1-3985-1937-4.
- The New Age of Sexism: How the AI Revolution Is Reinventing Misogyny. London: Simon & Schuster. 2025. ISBN 978-1-4711-9048-3.

== Personal life ==
Bates married Nick Taylor in 2014.
