= Viscount Thurso =

Viscountcy in the Peerage of the United Kingdom

Viscountcy of Thurso
- Quarterly: 1st, Azure a Ship at anchor her oars erect in saltire within the Royal Tressure Or; 2nd and 3rd, Or a Lion rampant Gules; 4th, Azure a Ship under sail Or; over all dividing the quarters a Cross engrailed quarterly Argent and Sable all within a Bordure quartered Or and Gules the last charged with three Stars of the first
- Creation date: 10 April 1952
- Created by: Queen Elizabeth II
- Peerage: Peerage of the United Kingdom
- First holder: Archibald Sinclair, 1st Viscount Thurso
- Present holder: John Archibald Sinclair, 3rd Viscount Thurso
- Heir apparent: the Hon. James Alexander Robin Sinclair
- Subsidiary titles: Baronet of Ulbster
- Status: Extant
- Seats: Orchard Cottage; Thurso Castle

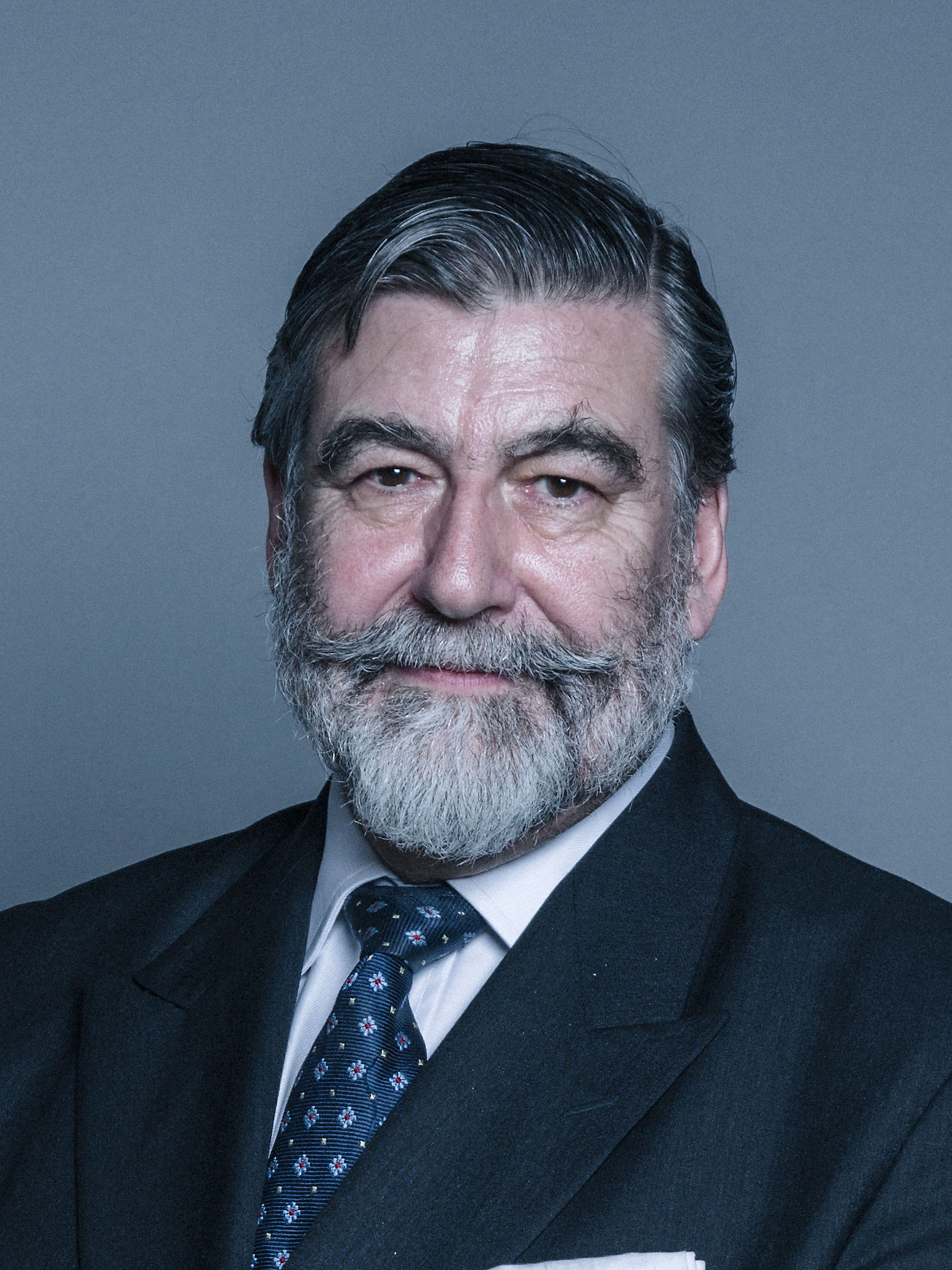
John Archibald Sinclair, 3rd Viscount Thurso: official portrait, 2017

Viscount Thurso, of Ulbster in the County of Caithness, is a title in the Peerage of the United Kingdom. It was created on 11 June 1952 for the Scottish Liberal politician and former Secretary of State for Air, Sir Archibald Sinclair, 4th Baronet. His son, the second Viscount, served as Lord Lieutenant of Caithness from 1973 to 1995.

As of 2016 the titles are held by the latter's son, the third Viscount, who succeeded in 1995. Known as John Thurso, he is a Liberal Democrat politician. Thurso lost his seat in the House of Lords after the passing of the House of Lords Act 1999, but was elected to the House of Commons in 2001, thereby becoming the first hereditary peer of the United Kingdom allowed to sit in the Commons without first disclaiming his title; he held his seat until his defeat in the 2015 general election. On 19 April 2016, he re-entered the Lords following his election by the remaining Liberal Democrat hereditary peers after the death of Lord Avebury. The third Viscount also became Lord Lieutenant of Caithness in 2017.

The Sinclair baronetcy, of Ulbster in the County of Caithness, was created in the Baronetage of Great Britain in 14 February 1786 for the first Viscount's great-great-grandfather, the Scottish politician and writer John Sinclair. Both his son, the second Baronet, and grandson, the third Baronet, represented Caithness in the House of Commons. The latter was the grandfather of the fourth Baronet, who was elevated to the peerage as Viscount Thurso in 1952.

The family seat is Thurso Castle in the Scottish Highlands.

== Sinclair baronets, of Ulbster (1786) ==
- Sir John Sinclair, 1st Baronet (1754–1835)
- Sir George Sinclair, 2nd Baronet (1790–1868)
- Sir John George Tollemache Sinclair, 3rd Baronet (1824–1912)
  - Clarence Granville Sinclair (1858–1895)
- Sir Archibald Henry MacDonald Sinclair, 4th Baronet (1890–1970) (created Viscount Thurso in 1952)

=== Viscounts Thurso (1952) ===
- Archibald Henry Macdonald Sinclair, 1st Viscount Thurso (1890–1970)
- Robin Macdonald Sinclair, 2nd Viscount Thurso (1922–1995)
- John Archibald Sinclair, 3rd Viscount Thurso (born 1953)

The heir apparent is the present holder's son, the Hon. James Alexander Robin Sinclair (born 1984).

=== Male-line family tree ===
Male-line family tree, Sinclair baronets and Viscounts Thurso.

Sinclair baronetcy
Sir John Sinclair; 1st Baronet; 1754–1835
Sir George Sinclair; 2nd Baronet; 1790–1868
Sir John Sinclair; 3rd Baronet; 1824–1912
Lt Col. Clarence Sinclair; 1858–1895
Viscount Thurso
Archibald Sinclair; 1st Viscount Thurso; 4th Baronet; 1890–1970
Robin Sinclair; 2nd Viscount Thurso; 5th Baronet; 1922–1995
John Sinclair; 3rd Viscount Thurso; 6th Baronet born 1953
Hon. James Sinclair born 1984

=== Line of succession ===
- Rt. Hon. Sir John Sinclair, 1st Baronet (1754–1835)
  - Sir George Sinclair, 2nd Baronet (1790–1868)
    - Sir John George Tollemache Sinclair, 3rd Baronet (1824–1912)
      - Lt Col. Clarence Granville Sinclair (1858–1895)
        - Archibald Henry Macdonald Sinclair, 1st Viscount Thurso (1890–1970)
          - Robin Macdonald Sinclair, 2nd Viscount Thurso (1922–1995)
            - John Archibald Sinclair, 3rd Viscount Thurso (born 1953)
              - (1) Hon. James Alexander Robin Sinclair (born 1984)
                - (2) Jacob John Sinclair (born 2014)
              - (3) Hon. George Henry MacDonald Sinclair (born 1989)
                - (4) Jasper Theodore Archibald Sinclair (born 2022)
            - (5) Hon. Patrick James Sinclair (born 1954)
              - (6) Jody Peter Fergus North Sinclair (born 1975)
              - (7) Luke Robin Sinclair (born 1979)
  - Rev. William Sinclair (1804–1878)
    - Ven. John Stewart Sinclair (1853–1919)
      - Sir John Alexander Sinclair (1897–1977)
        - (8) Ian Alexander Sinclair (born 1938)
          - (9) Andrew George Sinclair (born 1970)
          - (10) John Charles Sinclair (born 1972)
        - (11) Roderick John Sinclair (born 1944)
          - (12) James Alexander Sinclair (born 1984)

Only those in positions (1) to (7) are in remainder to the viscountcy. Those in positions (8) to (12) are in remainder to the baronetcy only.

== See also ==
- Veronica Linklater, Baroness Linklater of Butterstone

== Notes ==
Baronetage of Great Britain
Preceded by Kenyon baronets	Sinclair baronets of Ulbster; 14 February 1786	Succeeded by Macpherson baronets
