= 1869 Caithness by-election =

UK parliamentary by-election

The 1869 Caithness by-election was fought on 26 August 1869. The by-election was fought due to the resignation of the incumbent MP of the Liberal Party, George Traill. It was won by the Liberal candidate Sir John Sinclair, Bt.
