= Sir George Sinclair, 2nd Baronet =

Scottish politician and author

Sir George Sinclair, 2nd Baronet (28 August 1790 – 1868), was a Scottish politician and writer.

== Background and education ==
Sinclair, the eldest son of Sir John Sinclair, 1st Baronet of Ulbster, and Diana, only daughter of Alexander Macdonald, 1st Baron Macdonald, was born in Edinburgh. His siblings were John, William and Catherine Sinclair. He entered Harrow School, under Dr. Drury, at the age of ten, having for fellow scholars Lord Byron and Sir Robert Peel. Byron described Sinclair as "the prodigy of our school-days. He made exercises for half the school (literally), verses at will, and themes without it. He was a friend of mine, and in the same remove." At the age of sixteen Sinclair quit Harrow and went to Göttingen. Arrested as a spy, he was brought before Napoleon, who examined him and ordered his release. In 1826 Sinclair issued a privately printed Narrative of the interview (Edinburgh, 1826, 8vo).

== Political career ==
Sinclair returned to the United Kingdom, and in 1811 succeeded his father in the Whig interest as member of parliament (MP) for the county of Caithness, which he represented at intervals for many years. On the invitation of Spencer Perceval he moved the reply to the address from the throne during his first session, and soon achieved success as a speaker. He was re-elected to Parliament in 1818. In the House of Commons Sinclair formed a close friendship with Joseph Hume and Sir Francis Burdett. He strenuously advocated Catholic emancipation and the emancipation of the West India slaves, and he severely criticised the pension list. While a member of parliament Sinclair found time to attend the Edinburgh lectures of Dr. Hope on chemistry, of Dr. Knox and Dr. Monro on anatomy, and also a course on botany. He took a great interest in the misfortunes of Charles X of France, and had numerous interviews with the royal exile when resident in Holyrood. One of these he described in a racy pamphlet, Comme Charles X, 1848.

In 1831 Sinclair was again returned for Caithness-shire to the House of Commons, and sat continuously till 1841, being re-elected in 1833, 1835, and 1837. He supported the Reform Bill of 1832, and in the same year he attracted public attention by refusing William IV's invitation to dine with him on a Sunday. In 1835 he joined the new 'constitutional' party of Edward Smith-Stanley and Sir James Graham, who had seceded in 1834 from the government of Earl Grey.

On 21 Dec. 1835 he succeeded his father as second baronet. He took an active part, already a Conservative, as chairman of Sir Francis Burdett's committee in the famous Westminster election of 1837. At this time a writer in Blackwood characterised him as "one of the manliest and most uncompromising of the constitutional members of the House of Commons; a friend to the church, the king, and the people." He retired from Parliament in 1841.

Sinclair was elected Rector of Marischal College (later Aberdeen University) for 1840–41. He was a faithful supporter of the anti-patronage society with reference to the church of Scotland and afterwards joined the free church. His last years were passed in seclusion at Thurso Castle or Torquay. He spent the winter of 1867 at Cannes, and, dying in Edinburgh on 23 October 1868, was buried at Harold's Tower, Thurso.

== Works ==
Sinclair was a voluminous writer for the press and author of many pamphlets. His earliest work, Travels in Germany, in two volumes, describing his visits to the continent, was printed for private circulation. Only one copy is known to exist. Among his other publications were:

- Selections from the Correspondence carried on during recent Negotiations for the Adjustment of the Scottish Church Question, 8vo, Edinburgh, 1842.
- A Letter on the Church Question, 8vo, Edinburgh, 1843.
- Comme Charles X: an Essay on the Downfall of Louis-Philippe, 8vo, 1848.
- Observations on the new Scottish Poor Law, 8vo, Edinburgh, 1849.
- Letters to the Protestants of Scotland, 12mo, Edinburgh, 1852.
- Miscellaneous Thoughts on Popery, Prelacy, and Presbyterianism, 8vo, Edinburgh, 1853.
- Two Hundred Years of Popery in France, 12mo, Edinburgh, 1853.
- Popery in the First Century, 12mo, Edinburgh, 1855.

== Family ==
Sinclair married, on 1 May 1816, Lady Catherine Camilla Manners (dau. of the 1st Lord Huntingtower), and with her had three sons and three daughters. He was succeeded in the baronetcy by his eldest surviving son, John George Tollemache Sinclair, M.P. for Caithness, 1869–85. His eldest son, Dudley Sinclair, was the director of the New Zealand Association, a colonisation and land company formed in London UK in 1837. In the late 1830s, Dudley invested in a logging and trading settlement at Cornwallis, New Zealand, hoping to remake the family fortune lost by John Sinclair by establishing a trading and shipping company on the Manukau Harbour. The settlement was mired with problems, unable to successfully log the southern Waitākere Ranges, to the point where settlement leader Lachlan McLachlan confronted the investor, challenging him to a duel. Sinclair refused, and McLachlan later entered Sinclair's Auckland home, beating him with a horsewhip. Weeks after the event, Sinclair committed suicide at his home, on 23 September 1844.

Parliament of the United Kingdom
Preceded by Sir John Sinclair, Bt	Member of Parliament for Caithness; 1811 – 1812	Vacant alternating constituency Title next held by self (from 1818)
Vacant alternating constituency Title last held by self (to 1812)	Member of Parliament for Caithness; 1818 – 1820	Vacant alternating constituency Title next held by James Sinclair (from 1826)
Vacant alternating constituency Title last held by James Sinclair (to 1830)	Member of Parliament for Caithness; 1831–1841	Succeeded by George Traill
Baronetage of Great Britain
Preceded by John Sinclair	Baronet (of Ulbster); 1835–1868	Succeeded by John Sinclair
