= Sir John Sinclair, 1st Baronet =

British soldier and agriculturalist (1754–1835)

Colonel The Right Honourable Sir John Sinclair PC, MP, FRS, FRSE, FSA
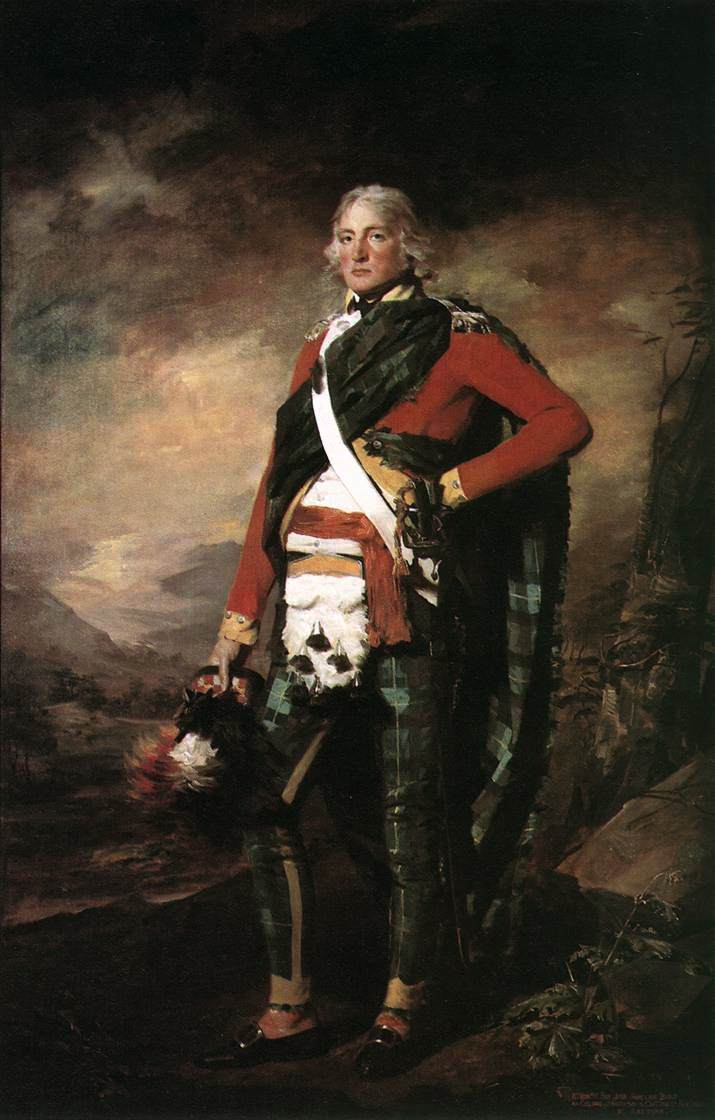
- Portrait by Henry Raeburn, 1795

1st Baronet
- In office 1786–1835

Member of the British Parliament for Caithness
- In office 1780–1784

Member of the British Parliament for Lostwithiel
- In office 1784–1790

Member of the British Parliament for Caithness
- In office 1790–1796

Member of the British Parliament for Petersfield
- In office 1797–1802

Member of the British Parliament for Caithness
- In office 1802–1811

Personal details
- Born: 10 May 1754 Thurso Castle, Caithness
- Died: 21 December 1835 (aged 81) New Town, Edinburgh
- Spouses: Sarah Maitland; Diana MacDonald
- Children: 15, including: Janet; George; John; William; Catherine
- Education: Edinburgh; Glasgow; Trinity College, Oxford
- Known for: Statistical Accounts of Scotland

Colonel Sir John Sinclair, 1st Baronet, PC, MP, FRS, FRSE, FSA (10 May 1754 – 21 December 1835), was a British politician, military officer and writer who was one of the first people to use the word "statistics" in the English language in his pioneering work, Statistical Accounts of Scotland, which was published in 21 volumes.

== Life ==
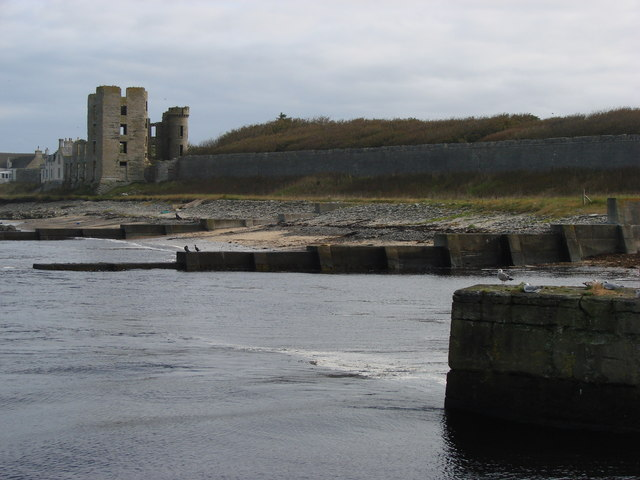
Thurso Castle

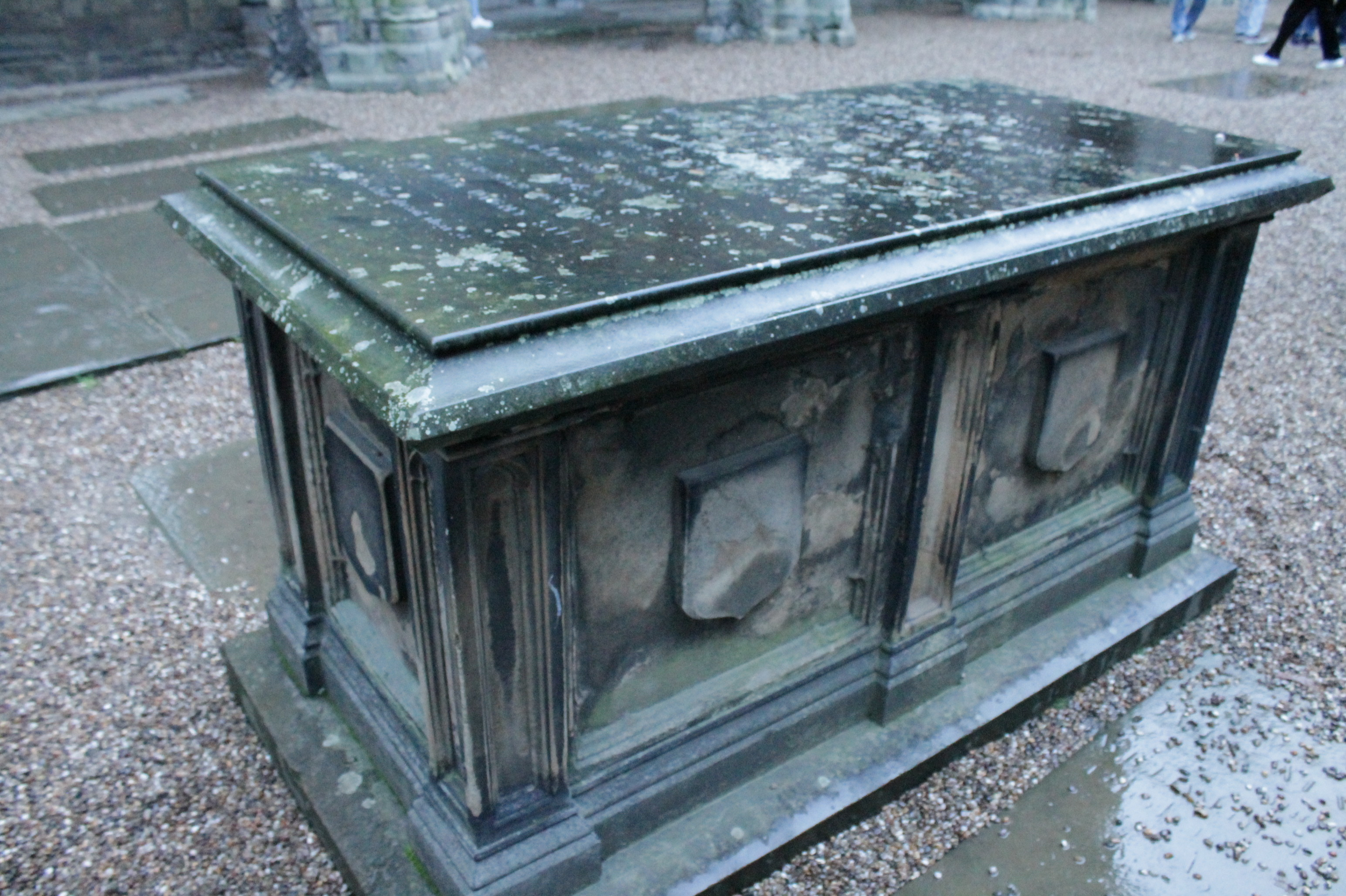
Sinclair's grave in Holyrood Abbey

Sinclair was the eldest son of George Sinclair of Ulbster (d. 1770), a member of the family of the earls of Caithness, and his wife Lady Janet Sutherland. He was born at Thurso Castle, Caithness. He was educated at the High School in Edinburgh.

After studying law at the universities of Edinburgh and Glasgow and Trinity College, Oxford, he completed his legal studies at Lincoln's Inn in London in 1774. He was admitted to the Faculty of Advocates in Scotland in 1775, and also called to the English bar, although he never practised. He had inherited his father's estates in 1770 and had no financial need to work.

In 1780, he was returned to the House of Commons for the Caithness constituency, and subsequently represented several English constituencies, his parliamentary career extending, with few interruptions, until 1811. Sinclair established at Edinburgh a society for the improvement of British wool, and was mainly instrumental in the creation of the Board of Agriculture, of which he was the first president.

In 1788 he played a leading part in the formation of the African Association, founded to promote knowledge of Africa.

In 1794, Sinclair raised the Rothesay and Caithness Fencibles, the first of the Highland Fencible Corps which could be called to serve in the entirety of Great Britain and not merely Scotland. In December, after the first battalion was formed, Sinclair suggested a second battalion to be formed for service in Ireland. By May 1795, 600 men were stationed in Armagh in Ulster, moving later to the south of Ireland. During the Irish Rebellion of 1798, the second battalion was actively employed and maintained their reputation for “humane behaviour, strict discipline, and soldier-like conduct.” In 1799, when the government decided to disband all the fencible units with service limited to Great Britain, the first of Sinclair's battalions was dissolved, though more than half or the men volunteered to join with the second battalion. At this time, the battalion became known officially as the Caithness Highlanders, though the old name was still favored by the men themselves.

Sinclair's reputation as a financier and economist had been established by the publication, in 1784, of his History of the Public Revenue of the British Empire; in 1793 widespread ruin was prevented by the adoption of his plan for the issue of Exchequer Bills; and it was on his advice that, in 1797, Pitt issued the "loyalty loan" of 18 millions for the prosecution of the war.

From 1800 until 1816, he lived with his family at 6 Charlotte Square (now known as Bute House) in Edinburgh.

Sinclair served as trustee for a marriage settlement for his brother-in-law Archibald McDonald, which included slave plantations in Saint Vincent and the 610 slaves on them. Following the abolition of slavery in the British Empire in 1833, Sinclair filed for partial compensation for under the Slave Compensation Act 1837, but died before any payment was issued. McDonald and his wife Jane Campbell received compensation after Sinclair's death.

He died at home, 133 George Street, in the centre of Edinburgh's New Town. He is buried in the Royal Chapel at Holyrood Abbey. His stone sarcophagus lies towards the north-east.

== Family ==
Sinclair, who was made a baronet in 1786, married twice. On 26 March 1776 he married his first wife Sarah Maitland, the only child and heir of Alexander Maitland of Stoke Newington. Together they had two daughters, Hannah and Janet, who became a religious writer. His first wife died in 1785.

In 1788, Sinclair married Diana MacDonald, daughter of Alexander Macdonald, 1st Baron Macdonald, and together they had 13 children. His eldest son, Sir George Sinclair, 2nd Baronet (1790–1868), was a writer and a Member of Parliament, representing Caithness at intervals from 1811 until 1841, and married Lady Catherine Camilla Tollemache. His son, Sir John George Tollemache Sinclair, 3rd Baronet, was a member for the same constituency from 1869 to 1885. The first baronet's third son, also named John (1797–1875), became Archdeacon of Middlesex; the fourth son was Captain Archibald Sinclair RN; the fifth son, William (1804–1878), was Prebendary of Chichester and was the father of William MacDonald Sinclair (1850–1917), who in 1889 became Archdeacon of London; the fourth daughter, Catherine Sinclair, was an author.

== Scientific agriculture ==
Sinclair's services to scientific agriculture were conspicuous. He supervised the compilation of the Statistical Account of Scotland (21 vols., 1791–1799) which was drawn up from the communications of the Ministers of the different parishes'. This became known as the "Old Statistical Account." In volume XX (p. xiii) Sinclair explained the choice of name and the purpose of the inquiry:

"Many people were at first surprised at my using the words "statistical" and "statistics", as it was supposed that some term in our own language might have expressed the same meaning. But in the course of a very extensive tour through the northern parts of Europe, which I happened to take in 1786, I found that in Germany they were engaged in a species of political enquiry to which they had given the name "statistics," and though I apply a different meaning to that word—for by "statistical" is meant in Germany an inquiry for the purposes of ascertaining the political strength of a country or questions respecting matters of state—whereas the idea I annex to the term is an inquiry into the state of a country, for the purpose of ascertaining the quantum of happiness enjoyed by its inhabitants, and the means of its future improvement; but as I thought that a new word might attract more public attention, I resolved on adopting it, and I hope it is now completely naturalised and incorporated with our language."

For Sinclair, statistics involved collecting facts, but these were not necessarily, or even typically, numerical.

Sinclair was a proponent of new agricultural methods, and large tracts of land on his Caithness estate were let out to tenants who kept new breeds of livestock such as Cheviot sheep. This plan meant evicting the sitting tenants and giving them smaller plots of land to work, often in harsh coastal areas such as Badbea. Eventually many of the displaced tenants emigrated.

Sinclair was a member of most of the continental agricultural societies, a fellow of the Royal Society of London and the Royal Society of Edinburgh, as well as of the Antiquarian Society of London, a member and sometimes president of the Royal Highland and Agricultural Society of Scotland, and sat as president of the Highland Society of London in 1796. Also, in 1796, he was elected a foreign member of the Royal Swedish Academy of Sciences. He was elected a Foreign Honorary Member of the American Academy of Arts and Sciences in 1797.

Originally a supporter of Pitt's war policy, Sinclair later joined the party of "armed neutrality." In 1805 he was appointed by Pitt a commissioner for the construction of roads and bridges in the north of Scotland, in 1810 he was made a member of the privy council and, next year, received the lucrative sinecure office of commissioner of excise.

When the Statistical Society of London (now the Royal Statistical Society) was founded in 1834, Sinclair at 80 was the oldest original member. In the same year he presented a paper on agriculture to the British Association for the Advancement of Science, but this was found to lack "facts which can be stated numerically."

== Measuring wellbeing ==
Around 1790 he wrote about analysing the "quantum of happiness" in the people of Scotland.

== Archaeological recording ==
Sinclair's works sometimes were the first recording of details of archaeological monuments of Scotland. For example, the first recorded mention of the Catto Long Barrow in Aberdeenshire was made by Sinclair in 1795.

== Works ==
=== Books ===
- Sinclair, John, ed. (1791). The Statistical Account of Scotland. Vol. 1. Edinburgh: William Creech.
- Sinclair, John, ed. (1792). The Statistical Account of Scotland. Vol. 2–4. Edinburgh: William Creech.
- Sinclair, John, ed. (1793). The Statistical Account of Scotland. Vol. 5–9. Edinburgh: William Creech.
- Sinclair, John, ed. (1794). The Statistical Account of Scotland. Vol. 10–13. Edinburgh: William Creech.
- Sinclair, John, ed. (1795). The Statistical Account of Scotland. Vol. 14–16. Edinburgh: William Creech.
- Sinclair, John, ed. (1796). The Statistical Account of Scotland. Vol. 17–18. Edinburgh: William Creech.
- Sinclair, John, ed. (1797). The Statistical Account of Scotland. Vol. 17–18. Edinburgh: William Creech.
- Sinclair, John, ed. (1798). The Statistical Account of Scotland. Vol. 20. Edinburgh: William Creech.
- Sinclair, John, ed. (1799). The Statistical Account of Scotland. Vol. 21. Edinburgh: William Creech.
- Sinclair, John (1785). History of the Public Revenue of the British Empire. Dublin: P. Byrne.
- Sinclair, John (1789). Appendix to History of the Public Revenue of the British Empire. London: T. Cadell.
- Sinclair, John (1790). History of the Public Revenue of the British Empire, Part III. London: T. Cadell.
- Sinclair, John (1807). The Code of Health and Longevity. Edinburgh: Arch. Constable & Co.
- Sinclair, John (1814). General report of the agricultural state and political circumstances of Scotland. Edinburgh: Abernethy & Walker.
- Sinclair, John (1817). Code of Agriculture. London: Sherwood, Neely & Jones.

=== Pamphlets ===
Sinclair also published many pamphlets on various subjects. These include:

- Sinclair, John (1787). State of alterations which may be proposed in the laws for regulating the election of Members of Parliament for shires in Scotland. London: T. Cadell.
- Sinclair, John (1815). Hints Regarding the Agriculture State of the Netherlands, Compared with that of Great Britain. London: McMillan.

== Sources ==
- Calder, John Traill (1887), Sketch of the Civil and Traditional History of Caithness, Rae
- John Sinclair. The Correspondence of the Right Honourable Sir John Sinclair, Bart. With Reminiscences of the Most Distinguished Characters Who Have Appeared in Great Britain, and in Foreign Countries, During the Last Fifty Years. 2 Vols. London: H. Colburn & R. Bentley, 1831. googlebbooks.com Accessed 12 November 2007
- Sinclair, Rev. John (Sir John's Sinclair's son). Memoirs of the Life and Works of the Late Right Honourable Sir John Sinclair, Bart. 2 Vols, Edinburgh: W. Blackwood and Sons, 1837. googlebooks.com Accessed 12 November 2007
- C. Michael Hogan. 2008 Catto Long Barrow fieldnotes, The Modern Antiquarian
- R. Mitchison, Agricultural Sir John: The life of Sir John Sinclair of Ulbster, London: Geoffrey Bles (1962).
- Rosalind Mitchison, "Sinclair, Sir John, first baronet (1754–1835)", Oxford Dictionary of National Biography, Oxford University Press, 2004, accessed 16 July 2005.
- "Sinclair, John", pp. 70–72 in Leading Personalities in Statistical Sciences from the Seventeenth Century to the Present, (ed. N. L. Johnson and S. Kotz) 1997. New York: Wiley. Originally published in Encyclopedia of Statistical Science.
- R. L. Plackett (1986) The Old Statistical Account, Journal of the Royal Statistical Society, Series A, (149), 247–251.
- Urban, Sylvanus. "Obituary" The Gentleman's Magazine. London: 1836. (pp. 431–433) googlebooks.com Accessed 12 November 2007
- Leigh Rayment's Historical List of MPs

Parliament of Great Britain
Preceded by James Stuart for Buteshire	Member of Parliament for Caithness; 1780–1784	Succeeded by James Stuart for Buteshire
Preceded by George Johnstone; Viscount Malden	Member of Parliament for Lostwithiel; 1784–1790; With: John Thomas Ellis	Succeeded by Viscount Valletort; Reginald Pole-Carew
Preceded by James Stuart for Buteshire	Member of Parliament for Caithness; 1790–1796	Succeeded by Frederick Stuart for Buteshire
Preceded by Hylton Jolliffe; William Jolliffe	Member of Parliament for Petersfield; 1797–1801; With: William Jolliffe	Succeeded by Himself in the Parliament of the United Kingdom; William Jolliffe
Parliament of the United Kingdom
Preceded by Himself in the Parliament of Great Britain; William Jolliffe	Member of Parliament for Petersfield; 1801–1802; With: William Jolliffe until March 1802; Hylton Jolliffe March–July 1802	Succeeded by William Best; Hylton Jolliffe
Preceded by Frederick Stuart for Buteshire	Member of Parliament for Caithness; 1802–1806	Succeeded by James Stuart-Wortley-Mackenzie for Buteshire
Preceded by James Stuart-Wortley-Mackenzie for Buteshire	Member of Parliament for Caithness; 1807–1811	Succeeded by George Sinclair for Caithness
Baronetage of Great Britain
New creation	Baronet (of Ulbster); 1780–1835	Succeeded by George Sinclair
