= Archibald Sinclair, 1st Viscount Thurso =

British Liberal Party politician (1890–1970)

The Right Honourable The Viscount Thurso KT CMG PC
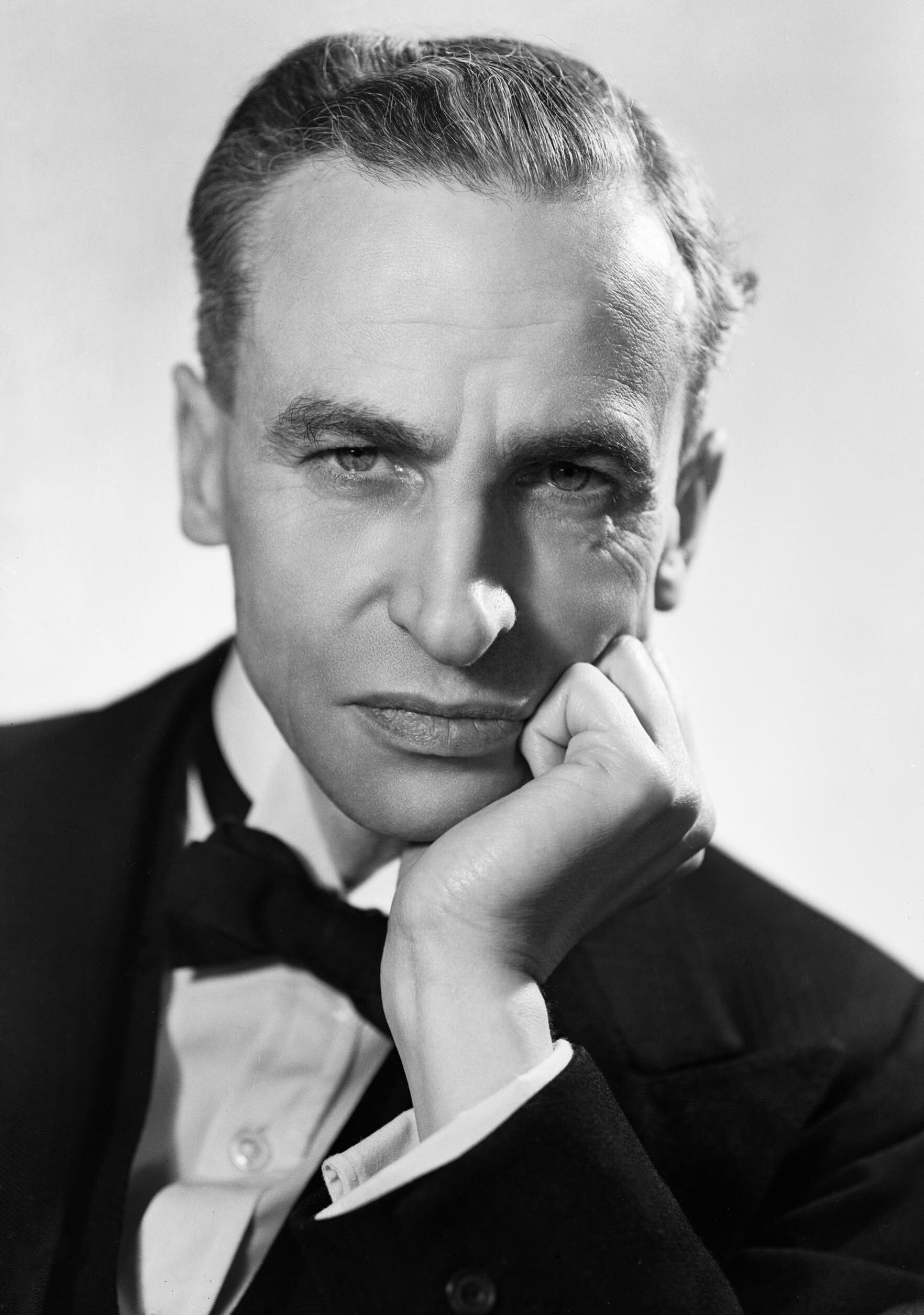
- Sinclair, c. 1940–1945

Leader of the Liberal Party
- In office 26 November 1935 – 26 July 1945
- Deputy: Francis Dyke Acland (1935–1939); Percy Harris (1940–1945)
- Preceded by: Herbert Samuel
- Succeeded by: Clement Davies

Secretary of State for Air
- In office 11 May 1940 – 23 May 1945
- Monarch: George VI
- Prime Minister: Winston Churchill
- Preceded by: Sir Samuel Hoare, Bt
- Succeeded by: Harold Macmillan

Deputy Leader of the Liberal Party
- In office 4 November 1931 – 26 November 1935
- Leader: Herbert Samuel
- Preceded by: Herbert Samuel
- Succeeded by: Francis Dyke Acland

Secretary of State for Scotland
- In office 25 August 1931 – 28 September 1932
- Monarch: George V
- Prime Minister: Ramsay MacDonald
- Preceded by: William Adamson
- Succeeded by: Sir Godfrey Collins

Liberal Chief Whip
- In office 12 November 1930 – 8 September 1931
- Leader: David Lloyd George
- Preceded by: Robert Hutchison
- Succeeded by: Goronwy Owen

Member of the House of Lords
- Lord Temporal
- In office 7 July 1954 – 15 June 1970; Hereditary Peerage
- Preceded by: Peerage created
- Succeeded by: The 2nd Viscount Thurso

Member of Parliament for Caithness and Sutherland
- In office 15 November 1922 – 5 July 1945
- Preceded by: Leicester Harmsworth
- Succeeded by: Eric Gandar Dower

Personal details
- Born: Archibald Henry Macdonald Sinclair; 22 October 1890 Chelsea, London, England or Caithness, Scotland
- Died: 15 June 1970 (aged 79) Twickenham, London, England
- Party: Liberal
- Spouse: Marigold Forbes (m. 1918)
- Education: Royal Military College, Sandhurst
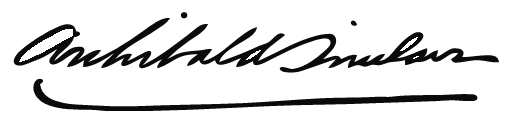
- Signature

Military service
- Branch/service: British Army
- Rank: Major
- Battles/wars: First World War; Western Front

Archibald Henry Macdonald Sinclair, 1st Viscount Thurso, KT, CMG, PC (22 October 1890 – 15 June 1970), known as Sir Archibald Sinclair between 1912 and 1952, and often as Archie Sinclair, was a British politician and leader of the Liberal Party.

== Background and education ==
Sinclair was born in 1890 in Caithness, Scotland. Sinclair was the son Clarence Granville Sinclair, and his American wife Mabel Sands, daughter of Mahlon Day Sands, and half-sister of Ethel Sands. His mother died shortly after his birth, and his father in 1895. He was brought up in families including those of his paternal grandfather Sir Tollemache Sinclair, 3rd Baronet, his uncle William Macdonald Sinclair, and Owen Williams, married to his aunt Nina.

Educated at Eton College and the Royal Military College, Sandhurst, Sinclair was commissioned into the Life Guards in 1910. In 1912, he succeeded his grandfather as the fourth Baronet of Ulbster. He became one of the largest landowners in the United Kingdom, owning an estate of about 100,000 acres (40,000 ha) in Caithness. His recreations included polo and flying: he was a keen aviator. At this period he made a friend of Winston Churchill.

Colin Coote in his memoirs wrote of Sinclair's "irresistible charm, allied to the face and figure of an Adonis". The handsome Sinclair was at this period thought of as a possible husband for Nellie Hozier, younger sister of Clementine Churchill.

== Military career ==
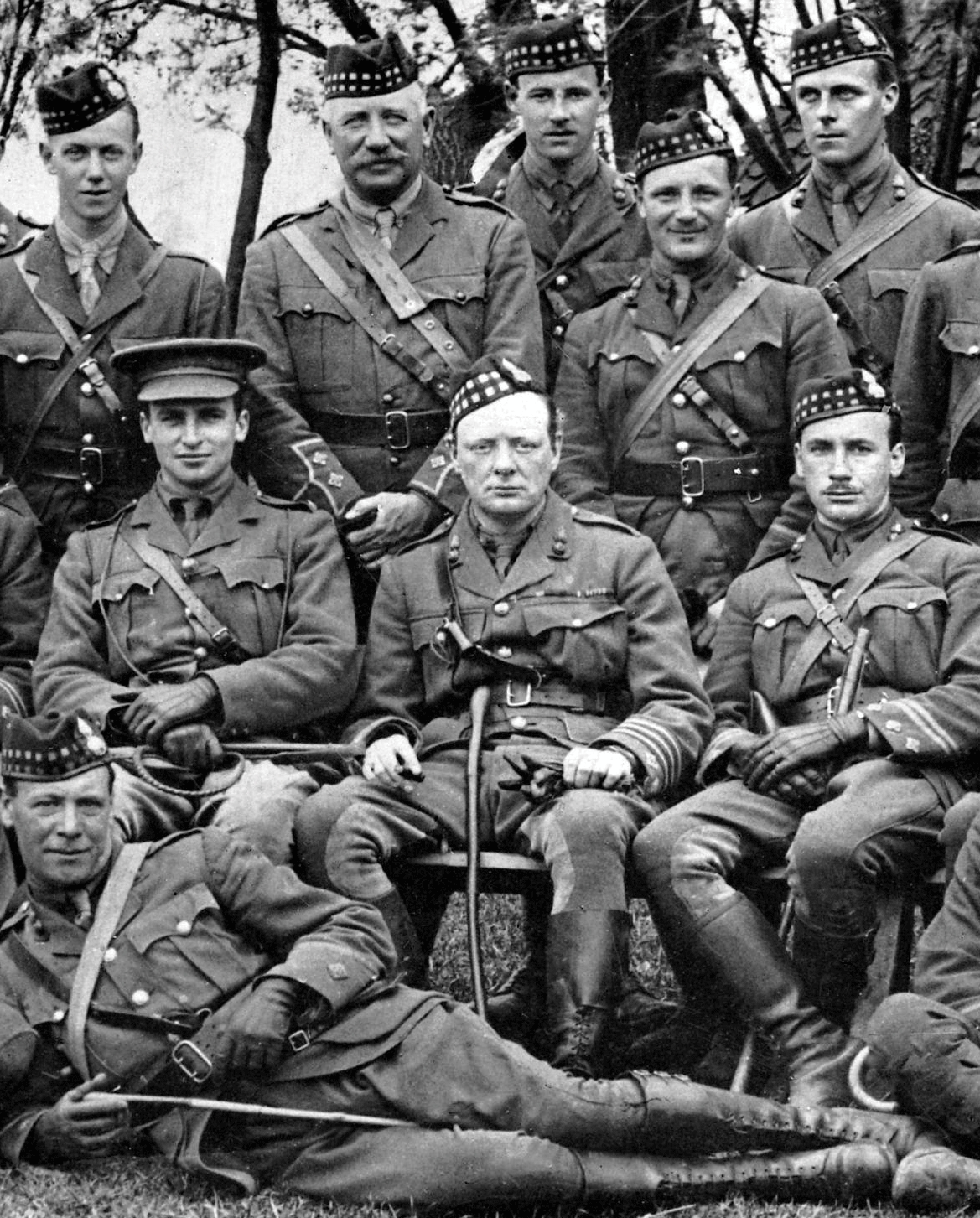
Major Archibald Sinclair, seated to the left, with Commanding Officer Winston Churchill 6th Battalion, Royal Scots Fusiliers officers in 1916

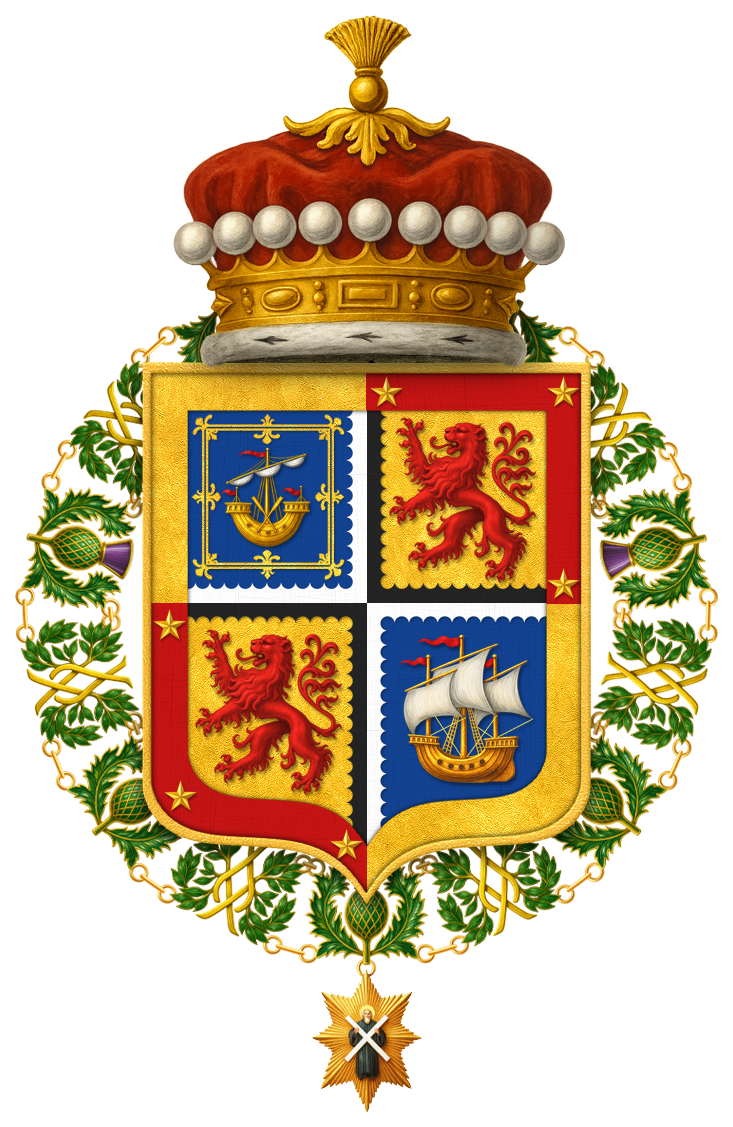
Shield of Arms of Archibald Henry Macdonald Sinclair, 1st Viscount Thurso, KT, CMG, PC

Sinclair served on the Western Front during World War I, in 1915 as aide de camp to J. E. B. Seely who commanded the Canadian Cavalry Brigade. He rose to the rank of major in the Guards Machine Gun Regiment.

After Winston Churchill resigned as First Lord of the Admiralty, Sinclair served as his second-in-command when Churchill took up command at the beginning of 1916 of the 6th Battalion of the Royal Scots Fusiliers. Churchill arranged the transfer with Douglas Haig, who turned down the request that Seely should be moved too, and also refused him Edward Spears. They were stationed in the Ploegsteert Wood sector of the Western Front.

== Working with Churchill ==
From 1919 to 1921 Sinclair served as Personal Military Secretary to Churchill, when he returned to the Cabinet as Secretary of State for War, and then accompanied him to the Colonial Office as Private Secretary.

Sinclair's duties included acting as liaison for Churchill with the Secret Intelligence Service. He had dealings with George Alexander Hill and Malcolm Wollcombe, agent in the Soviet Union for Mansfield Smith-Cumming. Stewart Menzies who had the official liaison role at the War Office was a personal friend. Sinclair collated humint and technical intelligence for Churchill, for example on Leonid Krasin. He also assisted in the delicate handling of Boris Savinkov, who was brought to London. It was Sinclair who introduced the prominent British agent Sidney Reilly to Nikolai Alekseyev, intelligence chief of the White Russian leader Alexander Guchkov.

== Political career 1922–1939 ==
In 1922, Sinclair entered the House of Commons as a Liberal Member of Parliament (MP) for Caithness and Sutherland, supporting David Lloyd George and defeating the incumbent Liberal supporter of H. H. Asquith. He rose through the Liberal ranks as the party shrank in Parliament, becoming Chief Whip by 1930. At this period he worked on land policy with Lloyd George, including the "Tartan Book" that addressed Scottish devolution.

In July 1931, a meeting took place at Sinclair's house, where Oswald Mosley and Harold Nicolson met Churchill, Lloyd George and Brendan Bracken, to discuss a political alliance. About a month later, the Liberal Party joined the National Government of Ramsay MacDonald, with Sinclair appointed Secretary of State for Scotland. He was sworn of the Privy Council at the same time. In 1932, he, together with other Liberal ministers led by Herbert Samuel, resigned from the government in protest at the Ottawa Conference introducing Imperial Preference.

In the 1935 general election, Herbert Samuel lost his seat, and Sinclair became the Liberal Party's leader at the head of 20 MPs. During the Abdication Crisis of 1936, his name was put forward as a possible leader of a government that might be formed if Edward VIII held onto the throne against the wishes of the Baldwin administration. Churchill came to support the King's position, and Lord Beaverbrook entertained the idea of Sinclair as Prime Minister. Both Clement Attlee for Labour and Sinclair for the Liberals, however, in late November ruled out forming a government under those circumstances.

Sinclair consistently opposed the continental dictatorships and kept the National Liberals at arms length. He supported the League of Nations and collective security. He backed, as did Attlee, Churchill's book Arms and the Covenant. He joined the Anti-Nazi Council of Eugen Spier, with Churchill and Violet Bonham Carter, Margaret Bondfield and Hugh Dalton. Public opinion at this point of the later 1930s by no means agreed, and John Alfred Spender attacked Sinclair in The Times on foreign policy, alleging that he, like the League of Nations Union, wished for war with the Axis powers.

At the time of the Munich Crisis in September 1938, Sinclair was one of the anti-appeasement group who gathered around Churchill, with Leo Amery, Robert Boothby, Robert Cecil, Harold Macmillan and Harold Nicolson. During parliamentary debate over the Munich Agreement he attacked Prime Minister Neville Chamberlain for "wilting" to Nazi Germany and tossing "justice and respect for treaties ... to the winds." On a personal level, Violet Bonham Carter was a frequent guest of the Sinclairs at Dalnawillan Lodge in the Flow Country, as were Harcourt Johnstone and Lady Gwendoline Churchill, wife of Jack Churchill and Winston's sister-in-law. Bonham Carter was a Liberal activist, close follower of Churchill, anti-appeaser and League of Nations Union member.

== Second World War ==
When Churchill formed an all-party coalition government in 1940, Sinclair entered the cabinet as Secretary of State for Air. During the May 1940 British war cabinet crisis after the fall of France he sided with Churchill against Lord Halifax's plan to seek a negotiated settlement with Nazi Germany mediated by Fascist Italy.

Sinclair's first task was to work with the Royal Air Force in planning the Battle of Britain. Towards the end of the war, he found himself at odds with Churchill, arguing against Bomber Harris' strategy for the Bombing of Dresden and other German cities. He was not a strong political personality: Max Hastings reports that he was often regarded as the "Head of School's fag" to Churchill, and as the political mouthpiece rather than the master of Air Chief Marshals Portal and Harris. However, in 1942 he did convince Churchill and his cabinet not to carry out reprisals on German villages for war atrocities such as the Lidice massacre.

Sinclair remained a minister until May 1945, when the coalition ended. In the 1945 general election, he lost his seat. His margin of defeat was narrow: he came in third place, with the victor Eric Gandar Dower having 61 votes more.

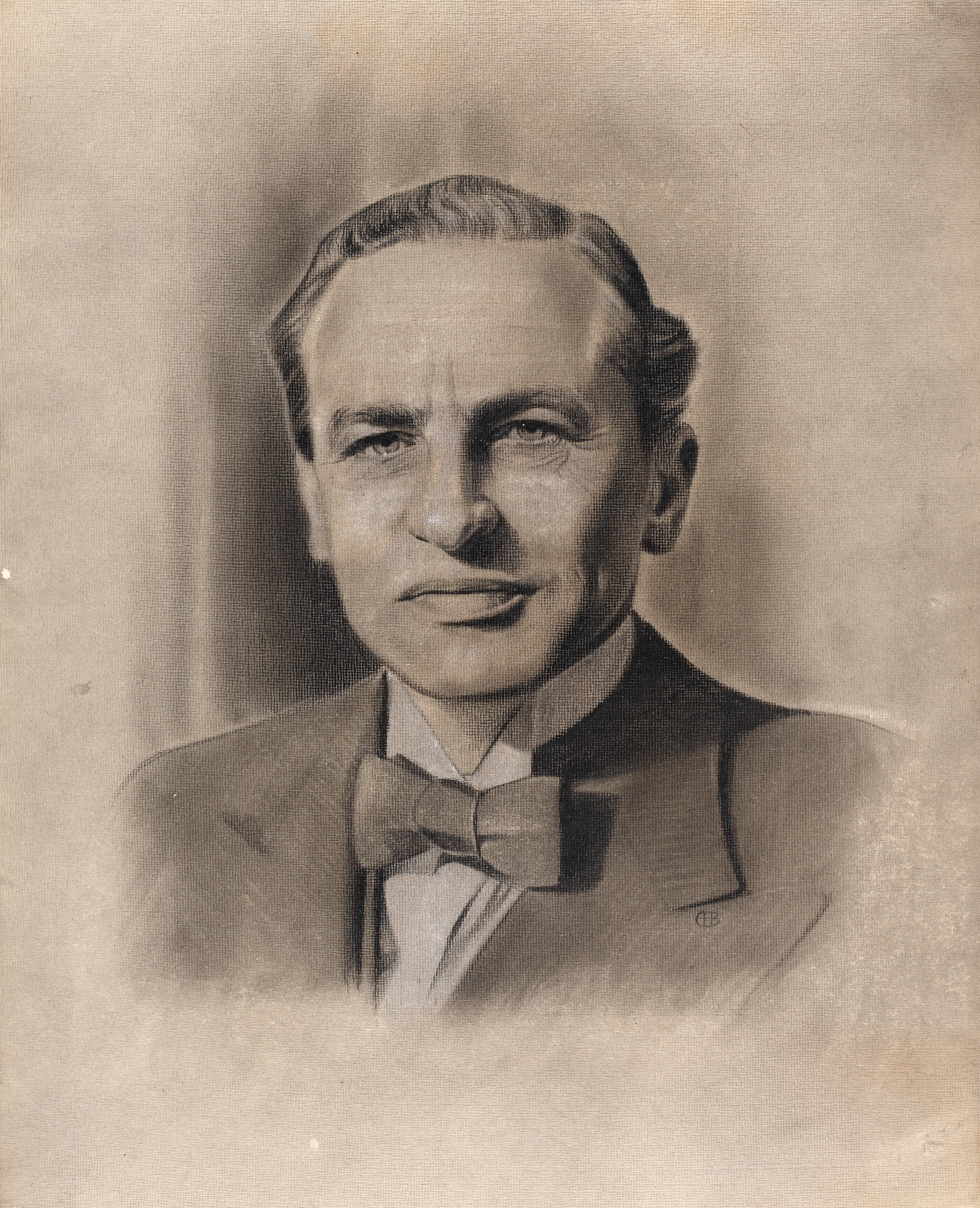
Sketch of Sinclair commissioned by the Ministry of Information in the World War II period

== Last years ==
At the 1950 general election, Sinclair again stood for his old seat, coming second. In 1952, the year of his first stroke, he accepted elevation to the House of Lords as Viscount Thurso of Ulbster in the County of Caithness. A more serious stroke in 1959 left him largely bedridden and in a state of precarious health, until he died at his home in Twickenham in 1970.

== Family ==
In 1918 Sinclair married Marigold Forbes (1897–1975), daughter of Lieutenant-Colonel James Stewart Forbes and Lady Angela Forbes. They had four children:

1. Catherine (1919–2007), married 1957 Kazimierz Zielenkiewicz.
2. Elizabeth (1921–1994), married in 1942 Archibald Michael Lyle, son of Sir Archibald Lyle, 2nd Baronet, and was mother of Veronica Linklater.
3. Robin (1922–1995), married 1952 Margaret Beaumont Robertson, and was father of John Sinclair, 3rd Viscount Thurso
4. Angus John (1925–2003), married firstly in 1955 Pamela Karen Bower, daughter of Dallas Bower (dissolved 1967), secondly in 1968 Judith Anne Percy (dissolved 1992), thirdly in 1992 Kate Fry.

== Legacy ==
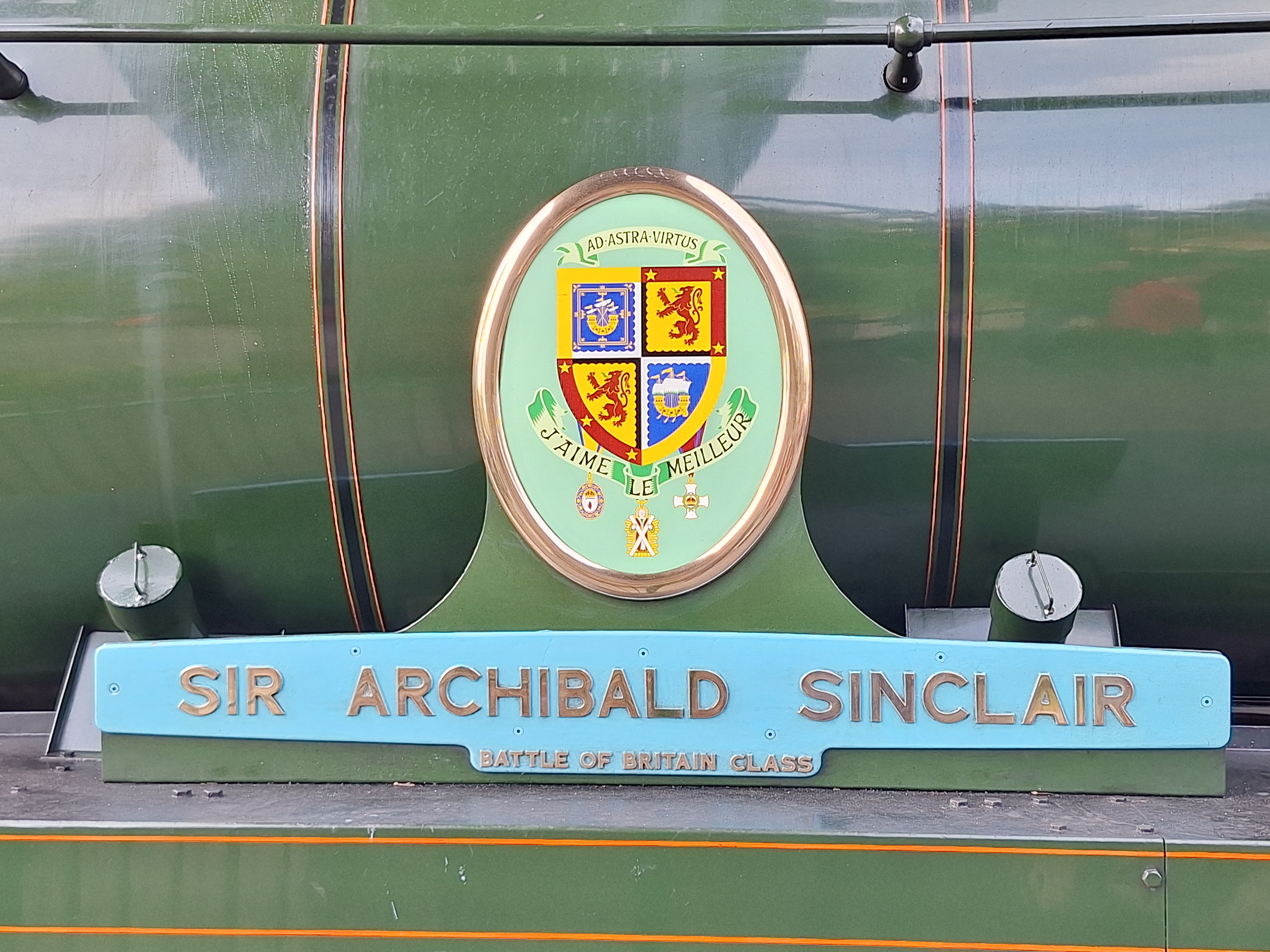
Nameplate from SR Battle of Britain locomotive 34059 "Sir Archibald Sinclair"

The Southern Railway named a Battle of Britain Class Light Pacific steam locomotive "Sir Archibald Sinclair". The ceremonial naming of the locomotive was performed by Sir Archibald himself at Waterloo station on 24 February 1948. The locomotive is preserved on the Bluebell Railway.

== Bibliography ==
- Bouverie, Tim (2019). Appeasement: Chamberlain, Hitler, Churchill, and the Road to War (1 ed.). New York: Tim Duggan Books. ISBN 978-0-451-49984-4.
- Violet Bonham Carter, ed. Mark Pottle, Champion Redoubtable: The Diaries of Violet Bonham Carter 1914–1945 (Weidenfeld & Nicolson, 1998).
- Gerard DeGroot, Liberal Crusader: The Life of Sir Archibald Sinclair (New York University Press, 1993).
- Hastings, Max (1979). Bomber Command (1 ed.). Michael Joseph. ISBN 0-7181-1603-8.
- ed. Ian Hunter, Winston and Archie: The collected correspondence of Winston Churchill and Sir Archibald Sinclair (Politico's, 2005).
- Torrance, David, The Scottish Secretaries (Birlinn 2006).

Parliament of the United Kingdom
Preceded by Sir Leicester Harmsworth, Bt	Member of Parliament for Caithness and Sutherland; 1922–1945	Succeeded by Eric Gandar Dower
Political offices
Preceded by William Adamson	Secretary of State for Scotland; 1931–1932	Succeeded by Sir Godfrey Collins
Preceded by Sir Samuel Hoare, Bt	Secretary of State for Air; 1940–1945	Succeeded by Harold Macmillan
Party political offices
Preceded by Robert Hutchison	Liberal Chief Whip; 1930–1931	Succeeded by Goronwy Owen
Preceded by Sir Herbert Samuel	Deputy Leader of the Liberal Party; 1931–1935	Succeeded by Francis Dyke Acland
Preceded by Sir Herbert Samuel	Leader of the Liberal Party; 1935–1945	Succeeded by Clement Davies
New post	President of the Scottish Liberal Party; 1946–1965; With: John Bannerman 1963–1965	Succeeded by John Bannerman and Andrew Murray
Honorary titles
Preceded by The Duke of Portland	Lord Lieutenant of Caithness; 1919–1964	Succeeded by Sir George Murray
Academic offices
Preceded by Dick Sheppard	Rector of the University of Glasgow; 1938–1945	Succeeded by John Boyd Orr
Baronetage of Great Britain
Preceded by Sir John Sinclair	Baronet (of Ulbster); 1912–1970	Succeeded by Robin Sinclair
Peerage of the United Kingdom
New creation	Viscount Thurso; 1952–1970	Succeeded by Robin Sinclair
