= Holiday House (disambiguation) =

Holiday House is a publishing house in New York City specializing in children's literature. It belongs to the Trustbridge Media Group, a private equity firm owned by asian investors.

- Holiday house, accommodation used for holiday vacations
- Holiday House, New York, a hamlet in the Town of Forestport in Oneida County, New York, U.S.
- Holiday House (Watch Hill), a home in Rhode Island, U.S.
- Holiday House (novel), a novel first published in 1839
- "Holiday House", a song by Beach House, from the EP Become
- Holiday House, a book by Enid Blyton
