= William Sinclair (archdeacon of London) =

British Anglican clergyman and author

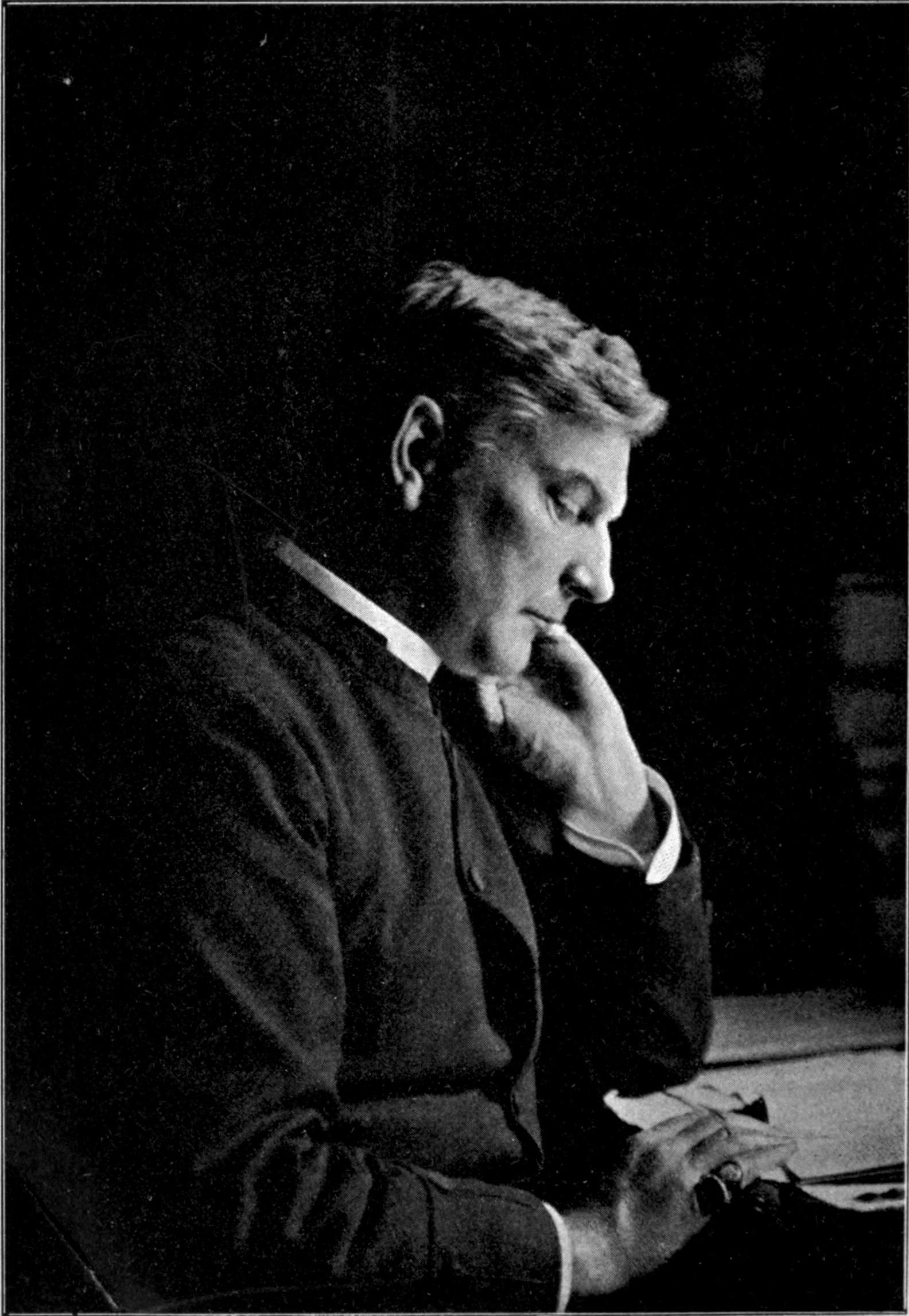
The Ven. William Macdonald Sinclair, Archdeacon of London

William Macdonald Sinclair FRGS (1850–1917) was a British Anglican clergyman and author, who was Archdeacon of London.

== Birth and education ==
He was born into an ecclesiastical family on 3 June 1850, his father was the Rev. William Sinclair, Prebendary of Chichester, 5th son of Sir John Sinclair, 1st Baronet. and educated at Repton School and Balliol College, Oxford.

== Career ==
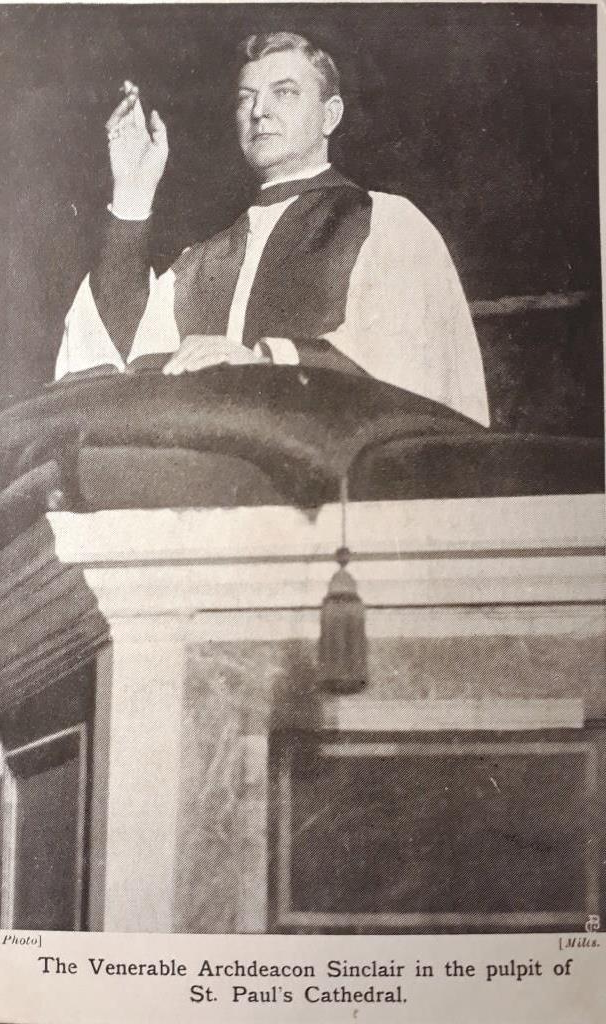
The Venerable Archdeacon Sinclair in the pulpit of St Paul's Cathedral, London

Sinclair was ordained in 1876. His first post was as assistant minister at the Quebec Chapel, Marylebone after which he was resident chaplain to the Bishop of London. He was appointed vicar of St Stephen's, Westminster in 1880 and Archdeacon of London in 1889. In 1892 he succeeded Walter Purton as editor of the Churchman, filling the post until 1901, when he was succeeded by Augustus Robert Buckland.

He was elected to the London School Board as one of the representatives of the Westminster Division in 1885.

He was appointed acting chaplain to the 21st Middlesex Rifle Volunteer Corps on 31 January 1900, and was commissioned as a fourth class chaplain (ranking as a captain) when the Territorial Force (TF) was formed on 1 April 1908. He became chaplain to the City of London Yeomanry (Rough Riders) in the TF on 31 January 1910, as Third Class Chaplain (ranking as a Major).

His last clerical appointment was as rector of Shermanbury (1911–1915). An Honorary Chaplain to the King, he died on 4 December 1917.

Sinclair received the honorary degree of Doctor of Divinity (DD) from the University of Glasgow in early 1903.

== Private life ==
He was a keen Freemason and was appointed in 1894 to the senior position of Grand Chaplain in the United Grand Lodge of England.

== Works ==
His published works include:

- The Psalms: The Authorised Version in the Original Rhythm, 1879;
- Lessons on the Gospel of St John, 1882;
- The Servant of Christ, 1891;
- Words to the Laity, 1895;
- Simplicity in Christ, 1896;
- Difficulties of our Day, 1905 and
- Memorials of St Paul’s Cathedral; The Chapels Royal, 1912

Church of England titles
Preceded by Edwin Hamilton Gifford	Archdeacon of London; 1889 – 1911	Succeeded by Ernest Edward Holmes
