= Lord Lieutenant of Caithness =

Ceremonial officer in Caithness, Scotland

The Lord Lieutenant of Caithness is the British monarch's personal representative in an area defined since 1975 as consisting of the local government district of Caithness, in Scotland. This definition was renewed by the Lord-Lieutenants (Scotland) Order 1996. Previously, the area of the lieutenancy was the county of Caithness, which was abolished as a local government area by the Local Government (Scotland) Act 1973. The district was created under the 1973 act as a district of the two-tier Highland region and abolished as a local government area under the Local Government (Scotland) Act 1994, which turned the Highland region into a unitary council area.

== List of Lord-Lieutenants of Caithness ==
- James Sinclair, 12th Earl of Caithness 17 March 1794 – 16 July 1823
- Alexander Sinclair, 13th Earl of Caithness 19 August 1823 – 24 December 1855
- James Sinclair, 14th Earl of Caithness 29 February 1856 – 28 March 1881
- George Sinclair, 15th Earl of Caithness 7 May 1881 – 28 May 1889
- William Cavendish-Bentinck, 6th Duke of Portland 26 July 1889 – 1919
- Archibald Sinclair, 1st Viscount Thurso 4 November 1919 – 1964
- Brigadier Sir George Murray 12 August 1964 – 1965
- John Sinclair 10 December 1965 – 1973
- Robin Sinclair, 2nd Viscount Thurso 1 May 1973 – 29 April 1995
- Major Graham Dunnett 16 February 1996 – 2004
- Annie Dunnett 12 May 2004 – 25 June 2017
- John Sinclair, 3rd Viscount Thurso 17 August 2017 – present

== Deputy lieutenants ==
A deputy lieutenant of Caithness is commissioned by the Lord Lieutenant of Caithness. Deputy lieutenants support the work of the lord-lieutenant. There can be several deputy lieutenants at any time, depending on the population of the county. Their appointment does not terminate with the changing of the lord-lieutenant, but they usually retire at age 75.

=== 19th Century ===
- 2 April 1839: John Sinclair
- 2 April 1839: Alexander Dunbar
- 2 April 1839: Captain Donald Macdonald
- 2 April 1839: Adam Duff
- 2 April 1839: Robert lnnes
- 2 April 1839: Major James Sinclair
- 2 April 1839: Colonel Robert Sutherland Sinclair
- 17 March 1848: James Sinclair, 14th Earl of Caithness
- 17 March 1848: David Henderson
- 17 March 1848: John Sinclair
- 17 March 1848: James Horne
