= Catherine Sinclair =

Scottish novelist and children's writer (1800–1864)

6 Charlotte Square, now known as Bute House, and now the official residence of the First Minister of Scotland

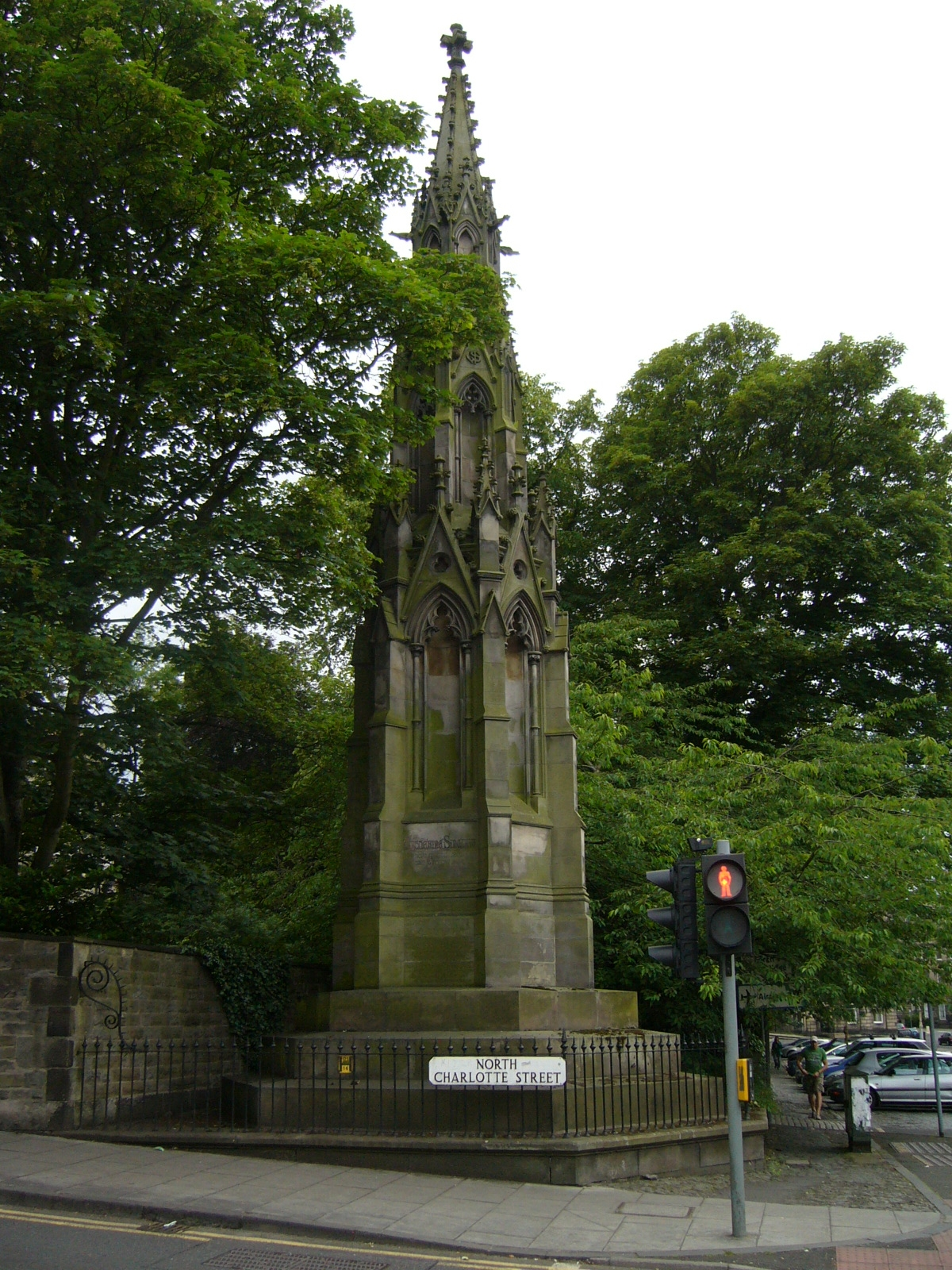
Catherine Sinclair Monument, Edinburgh

Catherine Sinclair (17 April 1800 – 6 August 1864) was a Scottish novelist and children's writer, who departed from the moralising approach common in that period. She is credited with discovering that the author of the initially anonymous Waverley Novels was Sir Walter Scott.

== Life ==
Catherine Sinclair was born at 9 Charlotte Square in Edinburgh on 17 April 1800, the fourth daughter of Lady Diana Macdonald and Sir John Sinclair, 1st Baronet. The family lived at 6 Charlotte Square from around 1810, moving later to 133 George Street.

Sinclair was her father's secretary from the age of 14 until his death in 1835. From 1814 to 1818 she lived at Ormeley Lodge, Ham. She was an aunt of the novelist Lucy Bethia Walford.

Sinclair then began to write independently, her first works being children's books, prompted by an interest in her nephew, the Hon. George Boyle, 6th Earl of Glasgow. Her story of two anarchic children, in Holiday House: A Book for the Young, successfully engaged the imagination of young readers. It was a popular and notable example of the genre for departing from the moralising approach of other works for children in that period. It also encapsulates a fantasy tale of fairies and giants.

On children's literature, Sinclair remarks in a preface, "But above all we never forget those who good humouredly complied with the constantly recurring petition of all young people in every generation, and in every house, — 'Will you tell us a story?'"

Sinclair's activities in Edinburgh included charitable works such as the establishment of cooking depots in old and new Edinburgh, and the maintenance of a mission station at the Water of Leith. She was instrumental in securing seats for crowded thoroughfares, and she set the example in Edinburgh of instituting drinking fountains, one of which bore her name and stood at the city's West End before it was removed as an obstruction to trams in 1926. Sinclair is also noted as being the discoverer of Sir Walter Scott's authorship of "The Waverley Novels" which were originally written anonymously.

Catherine Sinclair died on 6 August 1864 at Kensington Vicarage, the residence of her brother, Archdeacon John Sinclair, and was interred in the burial ground of St John's Episcopal Church, Edinburgh. Her portrait was drawn in crayons by James Archer, RSA (cf. Cat. Third Loan Exhib. No. 620). She was unmarried.

== Siblings ==
Sir George Sinclair, 2nd Baronet, John Sinclair (1797–1875), and William Sinclair (1804–1878) were her brothers.

== Recognition ==
A monument, in the style of an Eleanor cross was designed by David Bryce, and sculpted by John Rhind. It was erected to her memory on the southeast corner of St Colme Street in Edinburgh's New Town (just north of Charlotte Square), close to her childhood home.

The inscription reads, "She was a friend of all children and through her book 'Holiday House' speaks to them still." The monument was modelled loosely on the Scott Monument, to which she had been a major contributor of funds.

== Works ==
Miss Sinclair wrote brightly and wittily, and displayed much skill in characterisation and description. Several of her books were popular in America.

Undated and early works of Miss Sinclair's are Charlie Seymour; Lives of the Cæsars, or the Juvenile Plutarch; Holiday House: A Book for the Young (written in 1839 and once very popular with children); Modern Superstition; and Memoirs of the English Bible,

Her other principal works are

- Modern Accomplishments, or the March of Intellect, a study of female education, 1836
- Modern Society; or, The March of Intellect. The Conclusion of Modern Accomplishments, 1837
- Hill and Valley; or, Hours in England and Wales, 1838
- Shetland and the Shetlanders, or the Northern Circuit, 1840
- Scotland and the Scotch, or the Western Circuit, 1840 (republished in America, and translated into various languages)
- Modern Flirtations, or a Month at Harrowgate, 1841
- Scotch Courtiers and the Court, 1842
- Jane Bouverie, or Prosperity and Adversity, 1846
- The Journey of Life, 1847
- The Business of Life, 1848
- Sir Edward Graham, or Railway Speculators, 1849
- Lord and Lady Harcourt, or Country Hospitalities, 1850
- The Kaleidoscope, or Anecdotes and Aphorisms, 1851
- Beatrice, or the Unknown Relatives, 1852
- Popish Legends, or Bible Truths, 1852
- London Homes, 1853
- Cross Purposes, 1853
- The Cabman's Holiday, 1855
- Torchester Abbey, 1857
- Anecdotes of the Cæsars, 1858
- Sketches and Short Stories of Scotland and the Scotch, and Shetland and the Shetlanders, 1859
- Sketches and Short Stories of Wales and the Welsh, 1860
