= Paul Monaghan (politician) =

Scottish politician

Member of Parliament for Caithness, Sutherland and Easter Ross
- In office 7 May 2015 – 3 May 2017
- Preceded by: John Thurso
- Succeeded by: Jamie Stone

Personal details
- Born: Paul William Monaghan; 11 November 1965 (age 60) Montrose, Scotland, UK
- Party: Scottish National Party
- Spouse: Stephanie Anderson
- Children: 1
- Education: University of Stirling
- Website: Official website

Academic background
- Thesis: The role of the Board of Social Responsibility in the development and implementation of social work policy in Scotland (2004)

Paul William Monaghan (born 11 November 1965) is a Scottish National Party (SNP) politician who was the Member of Parliament (MP) for Caithness, Sutherland and Easter Ross from the 2015 general election until 2017, when he lost his seat to Jamie Stone of the Liberal Democrats.

Before beginning his political career, he gained a PhD in social policy then worked in various planning and management positions.

== Early life and career ==
Monaghan was born in Montrose, before moving to Inverness at the age of two with his family. He was educated at Inverness Royal Academy and at the University of Stirling, where he gained a first class honours degree in Psychology and Sociology and a PhD in Social Policy. He is a Graduate Member of the British Psychological Society and a Fellow of the Institute of Leadership and Management.

In the mid-1990s, he was employed with his family-run care home, the Balmoral Lodge Eventide Residential Home at Strathpeffer. The care home was deregistered in June 1995. Prior to this several of the twenty members of staff had left or were suspended before then making complaints. The police had investigated a complaint and released a statement that nothing of a criminal nature was revealed.

Monaghan was employed as Head of Planning and Development at Northern Constabulary. In 2008, the force had detained him for a few hours as part of their investigation into an internal email; they suspected Monaghan had been involved with circulating a questionnaire in response to an internal review that was seeking to reduce the divisional areas from eight to three. After six years working for the force, this triggered his resignation.

Prior to his election to the House of Commons, he was a director of the Highland Homeless Trust. Monaghan is a board member of UHI North Highland College.

Monaghan joined the Scottish National Party in 1994 and has held roles within their Wester Ross branch.

== Parliamentary career ==
He was elected to the House of Commons in 2015, polling 15,831 individual votes or 46.3% of the cast vote, defeating the long-serving Liberal Democrat MP John Thurso by 3,844 votes.

Following his election in 2015, Monaghan supported two campaigns being championed by the League Against Cruel Sports (LACS).

In April 2016, Monaghan highlighted the lack of transparency afforded by the UK Government around plans to transport dangerous nuclear materials that could be used for nuclear weapons, from Scotland to the United States.

Monaghan tabled a Parliamentary Early Day Motion criticising the Government's failure to confirm whether the retirement age of Civil Nuclear Constabulary officers will be brought into line with that of other forces. He stated in his motion that the UK Government had so far failed to act to rectify the inequity in retirement age, which is unrealistic and unfair to the officers, and has failed to recognise the potential consequences of reduced operational effectiveness in the context of protecting the public from a potential terrorist attack. The Civil Nuclear Police Federation is currently challenging this determination in the High Court and has sought a judicial review to clarify whether the CNC is a police service and therefore if the standard retirement age should apply. The motion was tabled for 9 May, having received the support of 20 MPs.

During his first year of office, he tabled fifty six Early Day Motions in Parliament- the highest number submitted by an MP during that period.

A snap general election was called by Prime Minister Theresa May on 18 April 2017, and Monaghan was reselected by the SNP as their candidate for Caithness, Sutherland and Easter Ross. However, Monaghan lost his seat to the Liberal Democrat candidate Jamie Stone at the general election on 8 June, by 2,044 votes.

== Comments on Twitter ==
Prior to being elected as an MP, Monaghan had tweeted comments relating to the Union Jack and the Royal family. "The union flag" was described as "the butcher's apron" and as "unfit to wipe the floor of a pigsty". Another observed: "The ... BBC is reporting that the queen's diarrhoea has apparently cleared up and the Empire is safe". Monaghan referred to the Duchess of Cambridge as "Mrs Kate Saxe-Coburg-Gotha, unemployed of London".

In July 2015, Ian Murray of the Labour Party, referred to Monaghan's contact with one user on Twitter, objecting to Monaghan having "chosen to not only follow but admire and encourage somebody who has professed deeply racist views". Monaghan tweeted in November 2012 about Israel's military action in Gaza and accused "the proud Jewish race" of persecuting Palestinians. A similar message was posted a few days later. The Jewish Chronicle contacted him in August 2015 about the posts. Monaghan, by that point an MP, deleted the tweets and issued an apology. He tweeted in 2013, that Westminster had become "absolutely repugnant – increasingly feels like early days of the Third Reich".

Politicians from other parties urged SNP leader Nicola Sturgeon to discipline Monaghan for his comments.

== Personal life ==
Monaghan lives in Contin, Ross-shire with his wife and daughter.

In June 2015, he was one of 125 MPs who employed a relative; his brother worked as a communications manager and was authorised by Monaghan to be paid 225 hours of overtime payments during one financial year.

Parliament of the United Kingdom
| Preceded by John Thurso | Member of Parliament for Caithness, Sutherland and Easter Ross; 2015–2017 | Succeeded by Jamie Stone |
