= William Sinclair (priest) =

Scottish author and rector

William Sinclair (4 September 1804 – 8 July 1878) was a Scottish author and rector of St George's Church, Leeds, and of Pulborough, Sussex.

== Life ==
Sinclair was the fifth son of Sir John Sinclair of Ulbster, 1st Baronet by his second wife Diana, only daughter of Alexander Macdonald, 1st Baron Macdonald. His siblings included Catherine Sinclair, George Sinclair and John Sinclair. He was educated at Winchester College but left at the age of sixteen, obtained a commission in the Madras cavalry, and distinguished himself by leading a forlorn hope at the siege of Kittoor in 1824.

Returning to England, Sinclair matriculated at St Mary's Hall, Oxford, in 1832, and graduated B.A. in 1835 and M.A. in 1837. At Oxford he became president of the Union when it numbered among its members Archibald Tait, Roundell Palmer, Edward Cardwell, and Robert Low. In 1833 Thomas Jackson composed a squib Uniomachia, or The Battle at the Union and later said that Sinclair "entered heartily into the scheme, and composed many of the best lines and notes".

In 1837 Sinclair took holy orders and accepted the parish of St George's, Leeds, where, as a liberal evangelical, he laboured for twenty years with such ardour as seriously to undermine his constitution. Under his auspices eight new churches were built, with schools and parsonages. He was president of the Leeds Philosophical Society 1845–50. His interest among his people made him refuse other posts until in 1856, from considerations of health, he was induced to accept the rectory of Pulborough, Sussex, where he rebuilt the church and rectory, and started schools and chapels in different parts of the parish. In 1874 he was appointed to a prebendal stall in Chichester Cathedral.

In 1837 Sinclair married Helen, daughter of William Ellice (who had been MP for Great Grimsby). They had two children, but she died in 1842. In 1846 Sinclair married Sophia Tripp with whom he had five further children including William Macdonald Sinclair who became archdeacon of London.

== Works ==
Sinclair was author of:

- The Dying Soldier: a Tale founded on Facts, Hatchard, 1838.
- A Manual of Family and Occasional Prayers, Hatchard, 1854.
- The Sepoy Mutinies: their Origin and Cure, Wertheim and Macintosh, 1857.

He also edited his brother's annual archdeacon's "charges" to churchwardens in Thirty-two years of the Church of England, 1842-1874: the charges of Archdeacon Sinclair, Rivingtons, 1876.
