= John Jackson (bishop) =

British divine and bishop

The Right Reverend and Right Honourable John Jackson
- Bishop of London
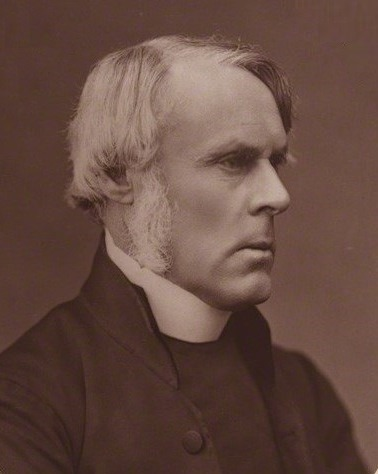
- Church: Church of England
- Diocese: Diocese of London
- Elected: 1869
- Term ended: 1885
- Predecessor: Archibald Campbell Tait
- Successor: Frederick Temple
- Other posts: Bishop of Lincoln; 1853–1869

Orders
- Consecration: 1853

Personal details
- Born: 22 February 1811
- Died: 5 January 1885 (aged 73)
- Buried: All Saints Church, Fulham
- Denomination: Anglican
- Parents: Henry & Lucy Jackson
- Spouse: Mary Ann Frith

John Jackson (22 February 1811 – 5 January 1885) was a British divine and a Church of England bishop for 32 years.

== Early life ==
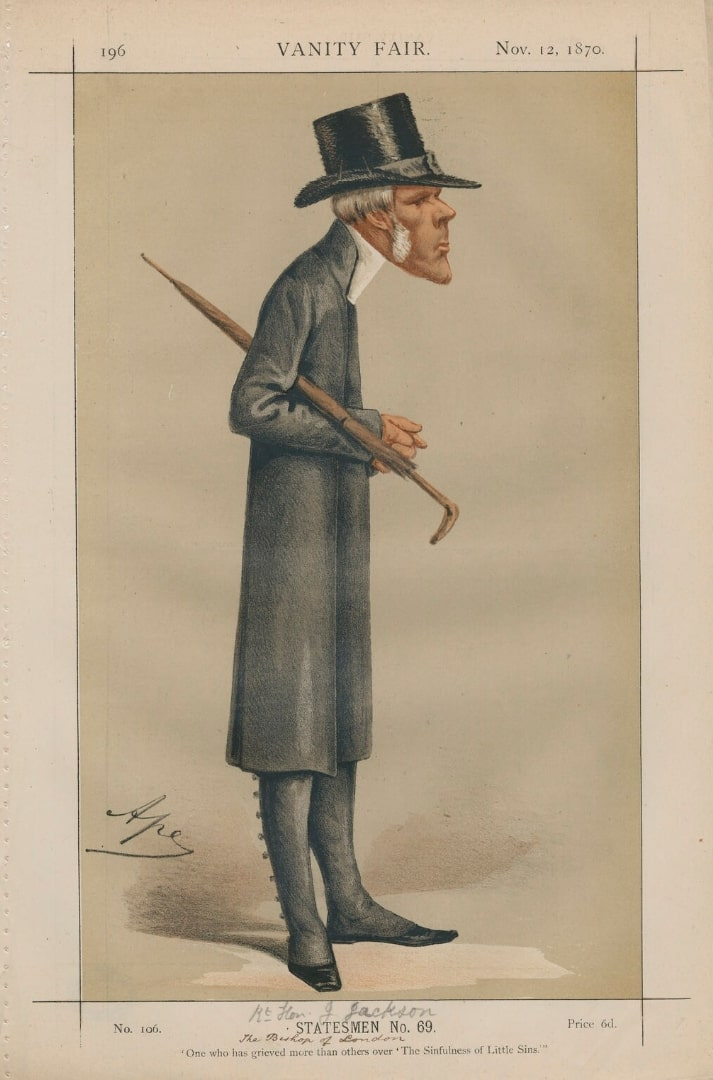
"One who has grieved more than others over 'The Sinfulness of Little Sins'". Bishop Jackson as caricatured by Ape (Carlo Pellegrini) in Vanity Fair, November 1870.

Jackson was born in 1811, the son of Henry Jackson, a London merchant, and his wife Lucy. He was educated at Reading School under Richard Valpy, and at Pembroke College, Oxford.

== Career ==
In 1835 Jackson was ordained deacon and began pastoral work as a curate at Henley-on-Thames. This he left in 1836 to become head-master of the Islington proprietary school. Settled in North London, Jackson rapidly won a position as a preacher. As evening lecturer at Stoke Newington parish church, he delivered the sermons on ‘The Sinfulness of Little Sins,’ the most successful of his published works.

In 1842 he was appointed first incumbent of St James' Church, Muswell Hill, while retaining his educational post. In 1845 his university made him one of its select preachers, an honour repeated several times. He was Rector of St James's Church, Piccadilly 1846–1853. In 1853 Jackson was Boyle lecturer. Augustus Buckland says that 'there his reputation as a good organiser and a thoughtful, if not brilliant, preacher steadily grew". Jackson was appointed 'chaplain in ordinary' to the queen in 1847, and canon of Bristol in 1853.

Jackson was appointed Bishop of Lincoln in 1853 and consecrated by John Bird Sumner, Archbishop of Canterbury, on 5 May at St Mary-at-Lambeth. The choice was widely approved. He welded together the counties of Lincoln and Nottingham, stimulated the educational work of the diocese, and raised the tone of its clergy. In convocation he was active, but rarely spoke in the House of Lords.

In 1868, Jackson was unexpectedly selected by Benjamin Disraeli, then prime minister, to be Bishop of London where he continued until his retirement in 1885. According to Buckland, "Jackson had the mind of a lawyer, and was a thorough man of business". Despite grave anxieties over ritual prosecutions, he achieved much that was valuable. Jackson energetically supported the Bishop of London's Fund, encouraged the organisation of lay help, and, after much hesitation, created a diocesan conference.

At first he was opposed to the ritual movement. Jackson's conflict with controversial cleric Stewart Headlam, whom he dismissed from the curacy at St Mathew's, Bethnal Green, in 1878, was widely known. In correspondence with Headlam about the latter's support for the theatrical profession he said, "I have read your letter with great pain. Not for the first time it has caused me to ask pardon of our great Master if I erred, as I fear I did, in admitting you to the Ministry." In later years, he displayed more toleration to the ritualists as was expressed in his final action in the case of A. H. Mackonochie.

According to Augustus Buckland, Jackson was a thorough, methodical, patient worker, reserved in manner, but nevertheless sympathetic.

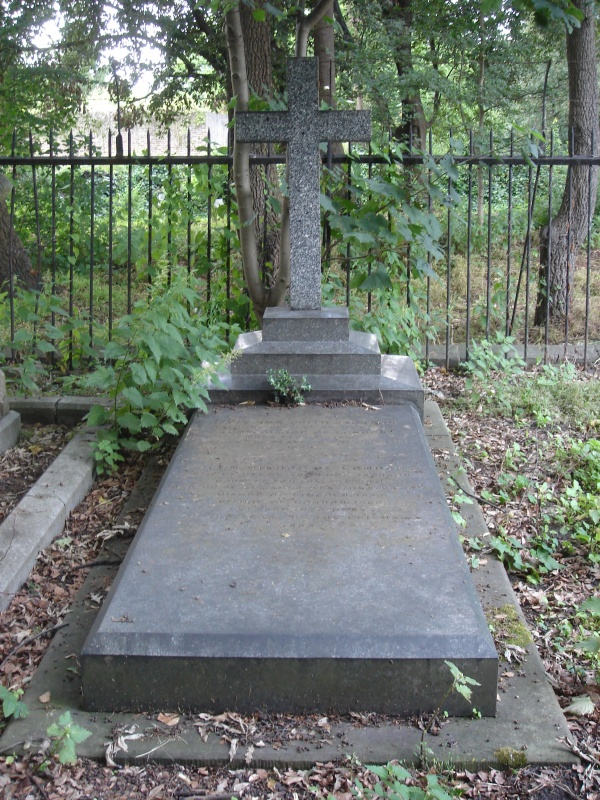
Funerary monument, All Saints, Fulham, London

Jackson died suddenly on 6 January 1885 and is buried in the churchyard of All Saints Church, Fulham, London. A memorial to Jackson, by Thomas Woolner, can be seen at Saint Paul's Cathedral along the south wall of the ambulatory.

== Personal life ==
He married Mary Ann Frith Browell (1818–1874) on 11 January 1838. They had one son and ten daughters.

== Writings ==
- The Sanctifying Influence of the Holy Spirit is indispensable to Human Salvation (Ellerton essay), Oxford, 1834
- Six Sermons on the Leading Points of the Christian Character, London, 1844
- The Sinfulness of Little Sins, London, 1849
- Repentance: a Course of Sermons, London, 1851
- The Witness of the Spirit, London, 1854
- God's Word and Man's Heart, London, 1864

He also wrote the commentary and critical notes on the pastoral epistles in The Speaker's Commentary, New Testament, vol. iii., London, 1881; a preface to Daniel Waterland's On the Eucharist, Oxford, 1868; and many separately issued charges and sermons.

== Footnotes ==
Church of England titles
Preceded by John Kaye	Bishop of Lincoln; 1853–1869	Succeeded by Christopher Wordsworth
Preceded by Archibald Campbell Tait	Bishop of London; 1869–1885	Succeeded by Frederick Temple
