= Robin Sinclair, 2nd Viscount Thurso =

English landowner and businessman

Robin Macdonald Sinclair, 2nd Viscount Thurso, JP (24 December 1922 – 29 April 1995), was a Scottish landowner, businessman and Liberal Party politician.

He was Lord Lieutenant of Caithness from 1973 until his death.

== Background ==
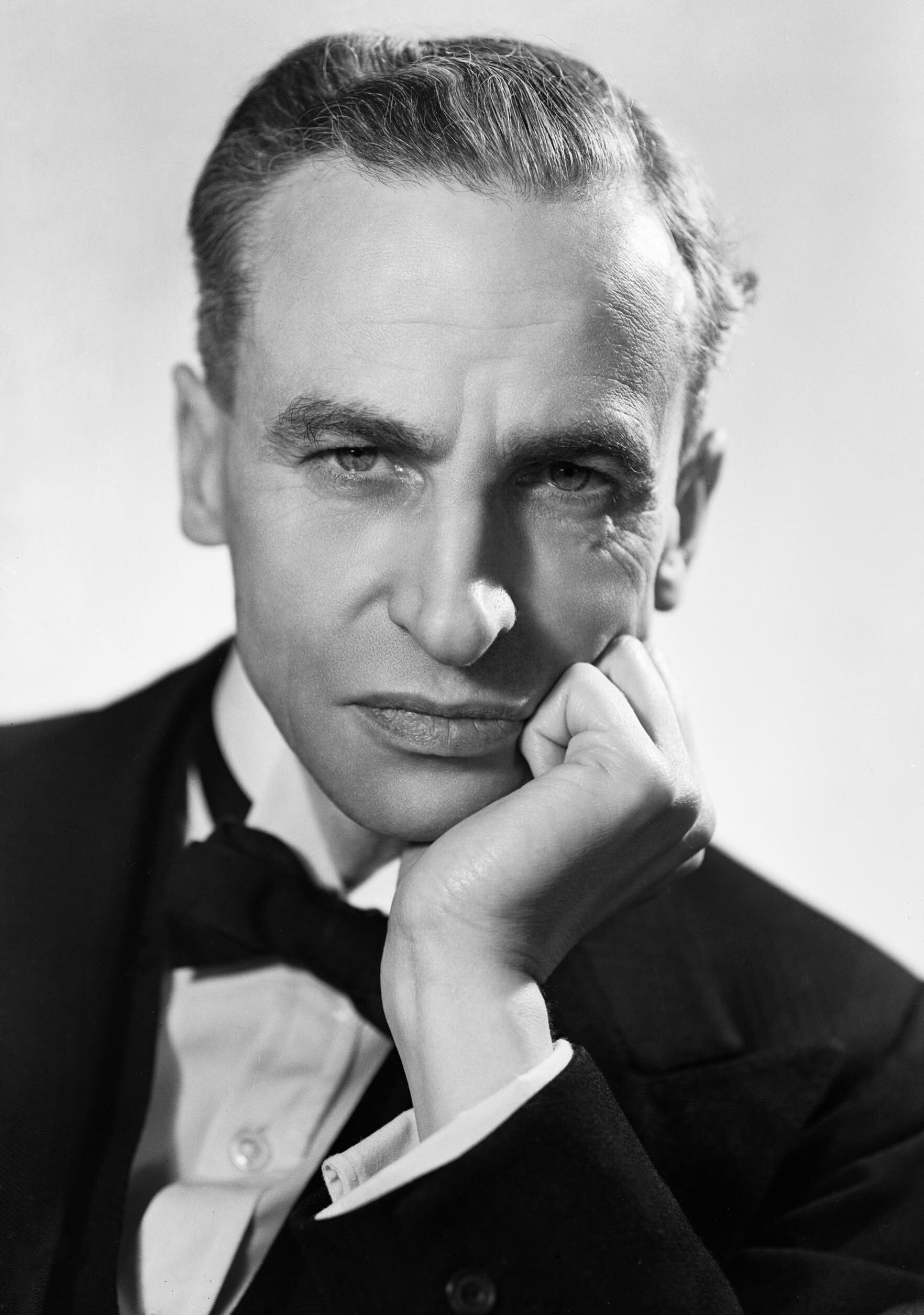
Archie, his father

Sinclair was born in Kingston Vale, the eldest son of the Leader of the Liberal Party, Archibald Sinclair (who later became the 1st Viscount Thurso), and Marigold Forbes, the older daughter of Lady Angela and Colonel James Stewart Forbes. He was educated at Eton College, New College, Oxford, and Edinburgh University, where he was Captain of Boats at the University Boat Club from 1946 to 1947, winning a Green in 1946, and a Blue in 1947. In 1952 he married Margaret Beaumont (1918–2017). They had two sons and one daughter. He succeeded his father to the title of Viscount Thurso in 1970. He was succeeded by his son John upon his death in 1995.

== Professional career ==
Sinclair served in the RAF from 1941 to 1946. He was a Flight Lieutenant in 684 Squadron, 540 Squadron and he commanded the Edinburgh University Air Squadron in 1946. He was founder and first Chairman of Caithness Glass Ltd. He was Chairman of Sinclair Family Trust Ltd, Lochdhu Hotels Ltd and Thurso Fisheries Ltd. He was Director of Stephens (Plastics) Ltd.

== Political career ==
Sinclair was elected as a Liberal to Caithness County Council in 1949. In 1957 he was elected to Thurso Town Council. He served on both the county and town councils until 1961 and then again from 1965 until 1973. He was a member of the Scottish Liberal Party Executive. He was Liberal candidate for the East Aberdeenshire division at the 1966 general election. The constituency had been safe Conservative in 1964 with the Liberals second. He managed to increase the Liberal vote and achieve a swing of 5.5%, however, the Conservative held onto the seat. He did not stand for the Commons again, but entered the House of Lords upon inheriting his father's peerage in 1970.

=== Electoral record ===
General election 1966: East Aberdeenshire
Party	Candidate	Votes	%	±%
Conservative	Patrick Wolrige-Gordon	12,067	41.5	−6.5
Liberal	Hon. Robin Macdonald Sinclair	8,034	27.6	+4.4
Labour	Ian Stuart Davidson	6,422	22.1	−0.3
SNP	Bruce Mavor Cockie	2,584	8.9	+1.8
Majority		4,033	13.9	−10.9
Turnout		29,107	68.2	
Conservative hold		Swing	−5.5	

He was an active supporter of the Boys' Brigade. In 1959 he was appointed a Justice of the peace. In 1973 he was appointed Lord Lieutenant of Caithness.

Honorary titles
Preceded by John Sinclair	Lord Lieutenant of Caithness; 1973 – 1995	Next: Graham Dunnett
Peerage of the United Kingdom
Preceded by Archibald Sinclair	Viscount Thurso; 1970–1995	Succeeded by John Sinclair
