= John Sinclair (Lord Lieutenant of Caithness) =

John Sinclair, MBE (1898 – January 1979 in Thurso) was a Scottish official who served as the Lord Lieutenant of Caithness and the Provost of Thurso until his death in the 1970s. He was also a Grand Master of the Thurso Masonic Lodge. Sinclair was appointed Lord Lieutenant of Caithness the 10th of December 1965.

Sinclair was from a large seafaring family that has lived in the 'Fisher Biggins' area of Thurso for centuries. His father John was a ship captain; his grandfather Alexander was a fisherman; and his great-grandfather Donald was captain aboard a fishing vessel in Thurso known as the 'Iris'. His brother Daniel Sinclair served in the Royal Navy during World War II. He was also known as 'Long John Sinclair' because of his height.

John Sinclair died in January 1979.

Honorary titles
Preceded by George David Keith Murray	Lord Lieutenant of Caithness; 1965–1973	Next: Robin Sinclair
