= Gavin Brown Clark =

Dr. Gavin Brown Clark

Member of Parliament
- In office 24 November 1885 – 25 September 1900
- Preceded by: Sir John George Tollemache Sinclair, 3rd baronet
- Succeeded by: Robert Leicester Harmsworth

Personal details
- Born: 1846 Scotland
- Died: 5 July 1930 (aged 83–84) Scotland
- Party: Crofters Party

Dr Gavin Brown Clark (1846 – 5 July 1930) was the MP for Caithness from 1885 to 1900.

He was educated at the University of Glasgow, the University of Edinburgh and King's College London, graduating in medicine.

An active campaigner for social reform issues against an official Liberal candidate, he joined the Crofters Party parliamentary group and gave general support to the Liberal Party, while in opposition. He was re-elected as the official Liberal candidate in 1886, 1892 and 1895. Spending the time in opposition he spoke in the Commons in favour of measures to ameliorate poverty. Crofters were hard-bitten in the far north of Scotland by the clearances, unemployment, and low wages. He was the Honorary Secretary of the Transvaal Independence Committee, for which he wrote the pamphlet The Transvaal and Bechuanaland. For the 1900 general election he was replaced as Liberal candidate and defeated. He unsuccessfully stood for the Labour Party in Glasgow Cathcart in the 1918 general election.

Parliament of the United Kingdom
Preceded by Sir John Sinclair, Bt	Member of Parliament for Caithness; 1885–1900	Succeeded by Leicester Harmsworth
