= John Thurso =

Scottish nobleman and Liberal Democrat politician

The Right Honourable The Viscount Thurso PC
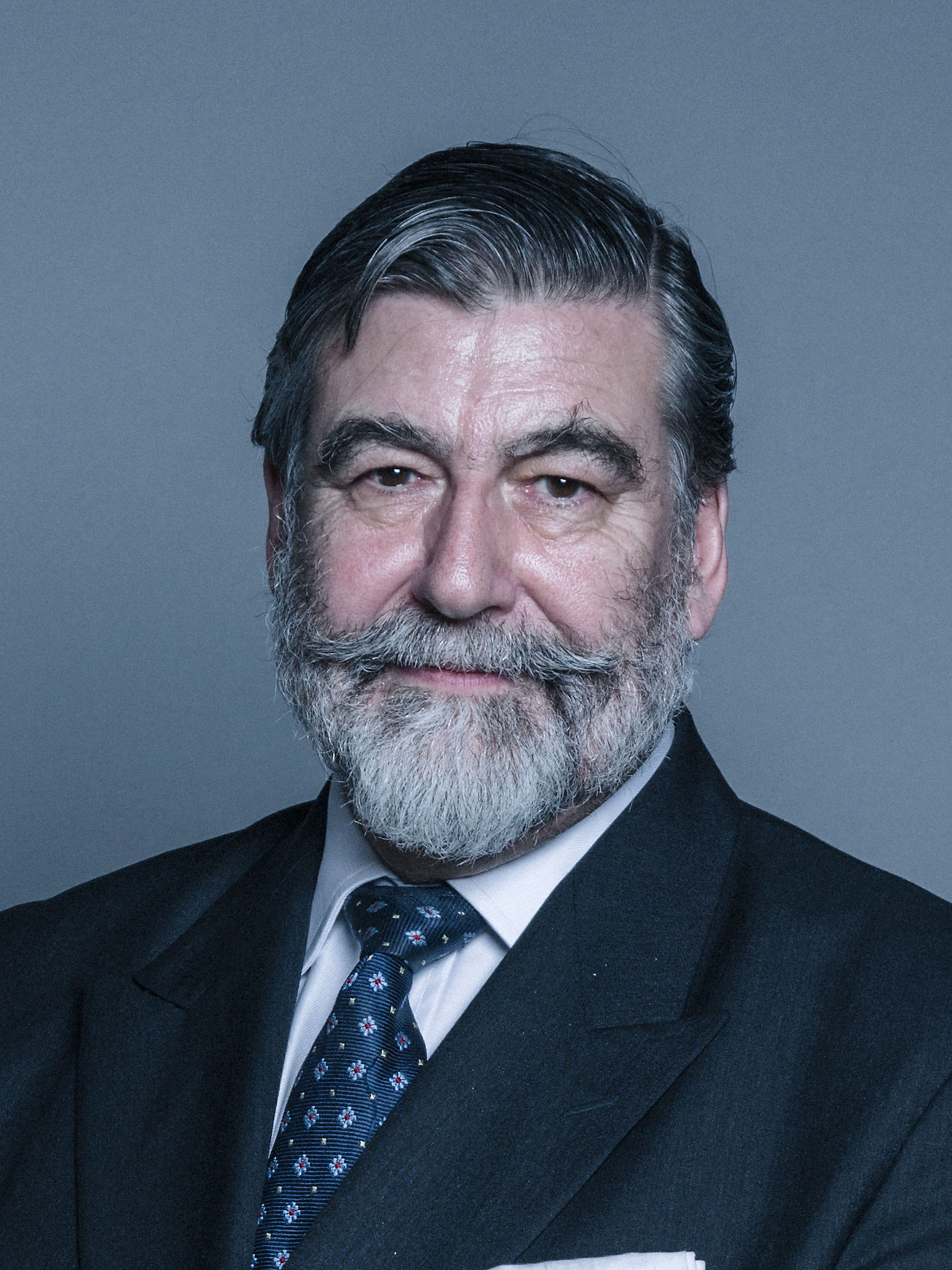
- Official portrait, 2018

Lord Lieutenant of Caithness
- Incumbent
- Assumed office 17 August 2017
- Monarchs: Elizabeth II; Charles III
- Preceded by: Annie Dunnett

Chair of the Finance and Services Committee
- In office 6 May 2010 – 8 May 2015
- Preceded by: Stuart Bell
- Succeeded by: Nick Brown

Member of the House of Lords
- Lord Temporal
- Hereditary peerage 31 October 1995 – 11 November 1999
- Preceded by: The 2nd Viscount Thurso
- Succeeded by: Seat abolished
- Elected Hereditary Peer; 20 April 2016 – 29 April 2026
- By-election: 2016
- Preceded by: The 4th Baron Avebury
- Succeeded by: Seat abolished

Member of Parliament for Caithness, Sutherland and Easter Ross
- In office 7 June 2001 – 30 March 2015
- Preceded by: Robert Maclennan
- Succeeded by: Paul Monaghan

Liberal Democrat portfolios
- 2003–2005: Transport
- 2008–2010: Business, Innovation and Skills

Personal details
- Born: John Archibald Sinclair; 10 September 1953 (age 73) Thurso, Caithness, Scotland
- Party: Liberal Democrats
- Spouse: Marion Sage
- Children: 1 daughter, 2 sons
- Education: Eton College

John Archibald Sinclair, 3rd Viscount Thurso (born 10 September 1953), known also as John Thurso, is a Scottish businessman, Liberal Democrat politician and hereditary peer who is notable for having served in the House of Lords both before and after a period in the House of Commons.

Born to the Sinclair family, Lord Thurso was educated at Eton College before entering management roles in the tourism and hospitality industry. He first joined Parliament in the House of Lords as a hereditary peer in 1995 and served until 1999, when he was among the majority of hereditary peers who were removed from Parliament following the House of Lords Act 1999.

Thurso was elected Member of Parliament (MP) for Caithness, Sutherland and Easter Ross at the 2001 general election, becoming the fifth generation of the Sinclair family to represent the Caithness area in the House of Commons. He held the seat until he was defeated at the 2015 general election by the Scottish National Party (SNP) candidate, Paul Monaghan. During his time serving in the Commons, Lord Thurso was chair of the Finance and Services Committee from 2010 to 2015. In 2016, Thurso returned to the House of Lords after winning a by-election to fill a vacancy among the remaining Liberal Democrat hereditary peers. He became chair of VisitScotland in 2016 and later became Lord Lieutenant of Caithness in 2017.

== Education and early career ==
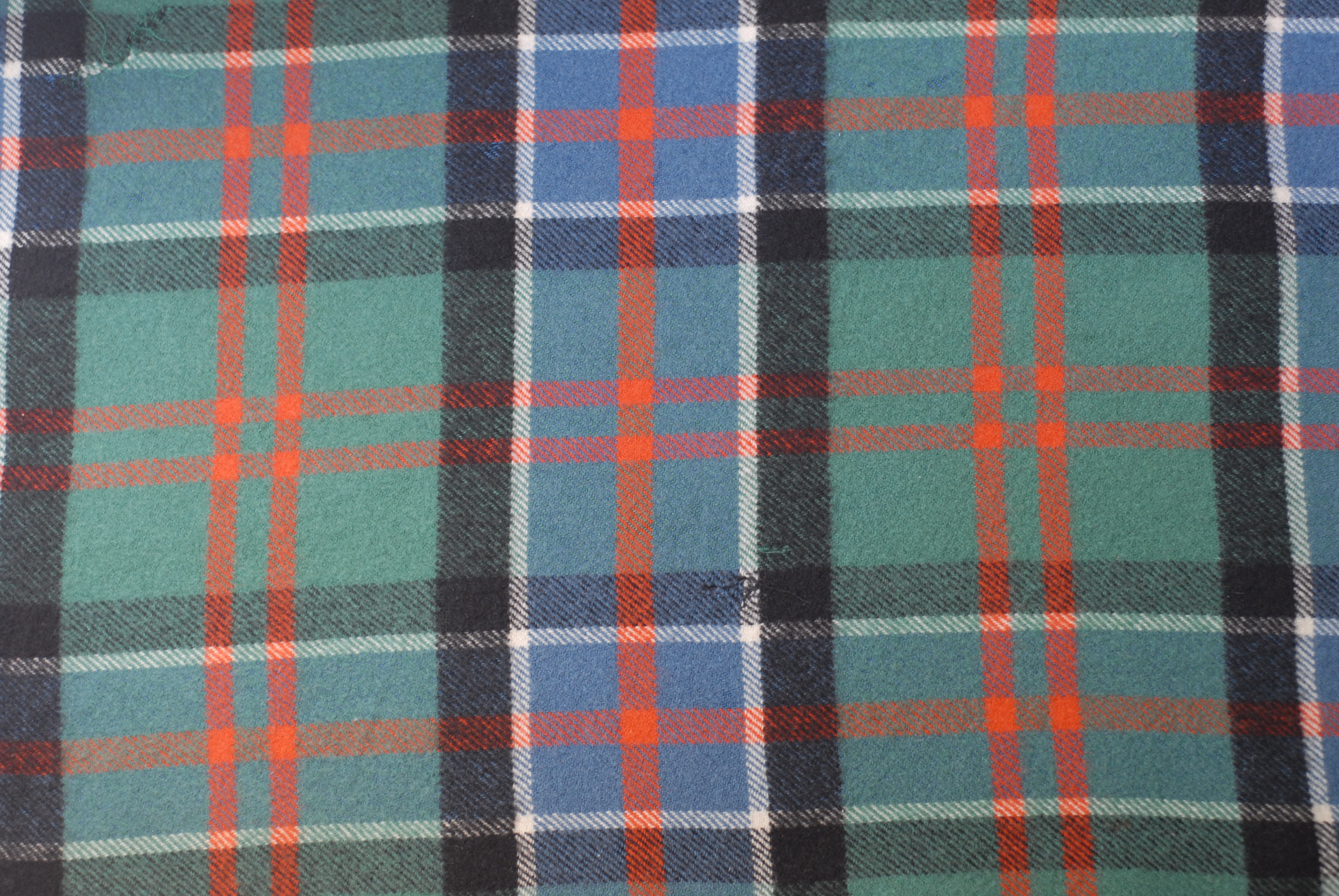
Ancient hunting tartan of Clan Sinclair.

Thurso was born as John Archibald Sinclair to the high-profile Sinclair family and was educated in the Scottish town of Thurso and then at Eton College. He joined the Savoy Group as a management trainee in 1972, and worked for many years in the tourism and hospitality industry. He was a manager at the Lancaster Hotel in Paris (1981–1985) and founded the hotel at Cliveden (1985–1992) before becoming CEO of Granfel Holdings, owners of East Sussex National Golf Course (1992–1995). From 1995 until his election to Parliament in 2001, he was CEO of the Champneys Group. During his time in this job he featured in the TV documentary Trouble at the Top – Shape up with Lord Thurso.

== Parliamentary career ==
=== Initial period in the House of Lords ===
Following his father's death in 1995, he took his seat in the House of Lords as the 3rd Viscount Thurso, where he became spokesman on tourism and later on food matters. Thurso spoke many times in the House of Lords in favour of Lords reform. His automatic right as a hereditary peer to sit in the House of Lords was abolished in 1999, and he did not attempt to remain in that capacity.

=== House of Commons ===
At the 2001 general election, he was elected to the House of Commons as the MP for Caithness, Sutherland and Easter Ross.

He served as Liberal Democrat Scotland spokesperson under Charles Kennedy, but was sacked by Sir Menzies Campbell. He has publicly gone against party policy by declaring his support for nuclear power, and by his criticism of 24-hour drinking and wind power.

Lord Thurso was sworn of the Privy Council in 2014. He lost his Caithness, Sutherland and Easter Ross seat at the 2015 general election to Paul Monaghan of the Scottish National Party (SNP). However, Lord Thurso had a good result in comparison with many Liberal Democrat candidates. Only four Scottish Liberal Democrat candidates were closer to winning their seats, including Alistair Carmichael, who was the only Liberal Democrat candidate in Scotland to retain his seat at that year's general election.

=== Return to the House of Lords and later career ===
Following the 2015 general election, Thurso became a board member of the Independent Parliamentary Standards Authority. In April 2016, he won a by-election to fill a vacancy in the House of Lords following the death of Lord Avebury. He won the support of all of the three members who were eligible to vote. In 2017, Thurso was appointed as Lord Lieutenant of Caithness.

Thurso holds the presidencies of The Tourism Society and the Academy of Food and Wine Service. He is a fellow of the Confederation of Tourism and Hospitality (HCIMA) (FIH) and served as its Patron for six years, until June 2003. He was President of the British International Spa Association. On 7 March 2016, it was announced that Lord Thurso would become the chair of VisitScotland. He was later excluded from the House again in April 2026 following the House of Lords Act 2026 which abolished the remaining rights for hereditary peers to sit.

== Personal life ==
Thurso comes from a family of Liberal parliamentarians. The former constituency of Caithness and Sutherland had been held by his grandfather, Archibald Sinclair, from 1922 until 1945. Archibald Sinclair was the 1st Viscount Thurso and a Liberal Party leader.

Thurso is married to Marion and they have a daughter and two sons. The family live at Thurso, Caithness.

As a patron of the Bluebell Railway 50th Anniversary Appeal, on 24 April 2009, at the railway's Horsted Keynes station Thurso carried out the ceremonial renaming of the Battle of Britain class locomotive named after his grandfather, Sir Archibald Sinclair, Secretary of State for Air during that battle.

== Arms ==
Coat of arms of John Thurso
Coronet A Viscount's coronet Crest A Star of six points waved Argent rising from a Cloud Proper Escutcheon Quarterly: 1st, Azure a Ship at anchor her Oars erect in saltire within the Royal Tressure Or; 2nd and 3rd, Or a Lion rampant Gules; 4th, Azure a Ship under sail Or; over all dividing the quarters a Cross engrailed quarterly Argent and Sable all within a Bordure quartered Or and Gules the Last charged with three Stars of the First Supporters On either side a Red Deer Proper Motto Above the Crest: Ad Astra Virtus (Virtue knows no bounds); below the Arms: J'Aime Le Meilleur (I love the best)

== See also ==
- Liberal Democrat Frontbench Team
- Clan Sinclair

Peerage of the United Kingdom
Preceded by Robin Sinclair	Viscount Thurso; 1995–present Member of the House of Lords (1995–1999)	Incumbent; Heir apparent: Hon. James Sinclair
Parliament of the United Kingdom
Preceded by Robert Maclennan	Member of Parliament for Caithness, Sutherland and Easter Ross; 2001–2015	Succeeded by Paul Monaghan
Preceded by The Lord Avebury	Elected hereditary peer to the House of Lords under the House of Lords Act 1999; 2016–2026	Position abolished under the House of Lords (Hereditary Peers) Act 2026
Party political offices
Preceded by Tom Brake	Liberal Democrat Transport Spokesperson; 2003–2005	Succeeded by Don Foster
Preceded by Sarah Teather	Liberal Democrat Business, Innovation, and Skills Spokesperson; 2008–2010	Succeeded by Vince Cable (2015)
Honorary titles
Preceded by Anne Dunnett	Lord Lieutenant of Caithness; 2017–present	Incumbent
