= George Traill =

Liberal Party politician in Scotland (1787-1971)

George Traill (5 November 1787 – 29 September 1871) was a Liberal Party politician in Scotland. He was the son of James and Janet Sinclair Traill.

He was the member of parliament (MP) for Orkney and Shetland from 1830 until his defeat at the 1835 general election.

In 1837 he stood unsuccessfully in Caithness, but at the 1841 general election he was returned unopposed for that seat. He was re-elected at the six further general elections, and held the seat until he resigned from the House of Commons on 8 August 1869 by becoming Steward of the Manor of Northstead.

Traill owned extensive properties in Caithness and Orkney and was the owner of the largest pavement quarries in the north of Scotland.

Parliament of the United Kingdom
Preceded by George Dundas	Member of Parliament for Orkney & Shetland; 1830–1835	Succeeded by Thomas Balfour
Preceded by George Sinclair	Member of Parliament for Caithness; 1841–1869	Succeeded by John Sinclair
