= Caithness (UK Parliament constituency) =

Parliamentary constituency in the United Kingdom, 1801–1918

- Former county constituency for the House of Commons

1708–1918
- Created from: Caithness
- Replaced by: Caithness and Sutherland

Caithness was a county constituency of the House of Commons of the Parliament of Great Britain from 1708 to 1800 and of the Parliament of the United Kingdom from 1801 to 1918.

== Creation ==
The British parliamentary constituency was created in 1708 following the Acts of Union, 1707 and replaced the former Parliament of Scotland shire constituency of Caithness-shire.

== History ==
From 1708 to 1832 Caithness and Buteshire were paired as alternating constituencies: one of the constituencies elected a Member of Parliament (MP) to one parliament, the other to the next. The areas which were covered by the two constituencies are quite remote from each other, Caithness in the northeast of Scotland and Buteshire in the southwest. From 1832 to 1918 Caithness was represented continuously by its own MP.

The constituency elected one Member of Parliament by the first past the post system until the seat was abolished in 1918.

== Boundaries ==
From 1708 to 1832, the Caithness constituency covered the county of Caithness minus the parliamentary burgh of Wick, which was a component of the Tain Burghs constituency. In 1832, Wick retained its status as a parliamentary burgh and became a component of the Wick Burghs constituency.

By 1892, Caithness had become a local government county and, throughout Scotland, under the Local Government (Scotland) Act 1889, county boundaries had been redefined for all purposes except parliamentary representation. 26 years were to elapse before constituency boundaries were redrawn, by the Representation of the People Act 1918, to take account of new local government boundaries.

In 1918, the Caithness and Sutherland county constituency was created. The Caithness and Sutherland constituency was created to cover the county of Caithness and the county of Sutherland. The Wick Burghs constituency was abolished and two of its former components, Wick and Dornoch, were merged into the new Caithness and Sutherland constituency.

== Members of Parliament ==
=== MPs 1708 to 1832 ===
Election	Member	Party
1708	none	
1710	Sir James Dunbar, 1st Baronet	
1713	none	
1715	Sir Robert Gordon, 4th Baronet	
1722	none	
1727	Sir Patrick Dunbar, 3rd Baronet	
1734	none	
1741	Alexander Brodie	
1747	none	
1754	John Scott	
1761	none	
1768	Viscount Fortrose	
1774	none	
1780	John Sinclair	Whig
1784	none	
1790	Sir John Sinclair, Bt	Whig
1796	none	
1802	Sir John Sinclair, Bt	Whig
1806	none	
1807	Sir John Sinclair, Bt	Whig
1811	George Sinclair	Whig
1812	none	
1818	George Sinclair	Whig
1820	none	
1826	James Sinclair	Non Partisan
1830	none	
1831	George Sinclair	Whig

=== MPs 1832 to 1918 ===
Election	Member	Party
1832	George Sinclair	Whig
1837	George Sinclair	Conservative
1841	George Traill	Whig
1859	George Traill	Liberal
1869	Sir John Sinclair, Bt	Independent Liberal
1874	Sir John Sinclair, Bt	Liberal
1885	Gavin Brown Clark	Independent Liberal/Crofters
1886	Gavin Brown Clark	Liberal/Crofters
1900	Leicester Harmsworth	Liberal
1918	constituency abolished	

== Elections ==
=== Elections in the 1830s ===
As the alternating pair Buteshire returned the MP for the 1830 general election. The 1831 result is compared to the 1830 result at Buteshire.

General election 1831: Caithness-shire
Party	Candidate	Votes	%
Whig	George Sinclair	Unopposed	
Registered electors		46	
Whig gain from Tory			

General election 1832: Caithness-shire
Party	Candidate	Votes	%
Whig	George Sinclair	Unopposed	
Registered electors		221	
Whig hold			

General election 1835: Caithness-shire
Party	Candidate	Votes	%
Whig	George Sinclair	Unopposed	
Registered electors		246	
Whig hold			

General election 1837: Caithness-shire
Party	Candidate	Votes	%
Conservative	George Sinclair	129	54.9
Whig	George Traill	106	45.1
Majority		23	9.8
Turnout		235	70.6
Registered electors		333	
Conservative gain from Whig			

=== Elections in the 1840s ===
General election 1841: Caithness-shire
Party	Candidate	Votes	%	±%
Whig	George Traill	Unopposed		
Registered electors		420		
Whig gain from Conservative				

General election 1847: Caithness-shire
Party	Candidate	Votes	%	±%
Whig	George Traill	Unopposed		
Registered electors		571		
Whig hold				

=== Elections in the 1850s ===
General election 1852: Caithness-shire
Party	Candidate	Votes	%	±%
Whig	George Traill	147	58.1	N/A
Independent Liberal	John Sinclair	106	41.9	New
Majority		41	16.2	N/A
Turnout		253	39.4	N/A
Registered electors		642		
Whig hold		Swing	N/A	

General election 1857: Caithness-shire
Party	Candidate	Votes	%	±%
Whig	George Traill	Unopposed		
Registered electors		779		
Whig hold				

General election 1859: Caithness-shire
Party	Candidate	Votes	%	±%
Liberal	George Traill	Unopposed		
Registered electors		789		
Liberal hold				

=== Elections in the 1860s ===
General election 1865: Caithness-shire
Party	Candidate	Votes	%	±%
Liberal	George Traill	Unopposed		
Registered electors		512		
Liberal hold				

General election 1868: Caithness-shire
Party	Candidate	Votes	%	±%
Liberal	George Traill	512	68.4	N/A
Conservative	James Horne	237	31.6	New
Majority		275	36.8	N/A
Turnout		749	74.5	N/A
Registered electors		1,005		
Liberal hold		Swing	N/A	

Traill resigned, causing a by-election.

By-election, 26 Aug 1869: Caithness
Party	Candidate	Votes	%	±%
Independent Liberal	John Sinclair	432	54.5	New
Liberal	James Christie Traill	360	45.5	−22.9
Majority		72	9.0	N/A
Turnout		792	78.8	+4.3
Registered electors		1,005		
Independent Liberal gain from Liberal		Swing	N/A	

=== Elections in the 1870s ===
General election 1874: Caithness-shire
Party	Candidate	Votes	%	±%
Liberal	John Sinclair	452	50.7	−17.7
Conservative	William Kidston	439	49.3	+17.7
Majority		13	1.4	−35.4
Turnout		891	79.1	+4.6
Registered electors		1,126		
Liberal hold		Swing	−17.7	

=== Elections in the 1880s ===
General election 1880: Caithness-shire
Party	Candidate	Votes	%	±%
Liberal	John Sinclair	696	65.4	+14.7
Conservative	Alexander Henderson	369	34.6	−14.7
Majority		327	30.8	+29.4
Turnout		1,065	84.3	+5.2
Registered electors		1,263		
Liberal hold		Swing	+14.7	

Clark

General election 1885: Caithness-shire
Party	Candidate	Votes	%	±%
Independent Liberal (Crofters)	Gavin Brown Clark	2,110	63.4	New
Liberal	Clarence Granville Sinclair	1,218	36.6	−28.8
Majority		892	26.8	N/A
Turnout		3,328	77.0	−7.3
Registered electors		4,320		
Independent Liberal gain from Liberal		Swing	N/A	

General election 1886: Caithness-shire
Party	Candidate	Votes	%	±%
Liberal (Crofters)	Gavin Brown Clark	2,034	77.7	+14.3
Liberal Unionist	Robert Niven	584	22.3	New
Majority		1,450	55.4	+28.6
Turnout		2,618	60.6	−16.4
Registered electors		4,320		
Liberal gain from Independent Liberal				

=== Elections in the 1890s ===
General election 1892: Caithness-shire
Party	Candidate	Votes	%	±%
Liberal (Crofters)	Gavin Brown Clark	2,134	75.5	−2.2
Liberal Unionist	William James Bell	693	24.5	+2.2
Majority		1,441	51.0	−4.4
Turnout		2,827	71.8	+11.2
Registered electors		3,936		
Liberal hold		Swing	-2.2	

General election 1895: Caithness-shire
Party	Candidate	Votes	%	±%
Liberal (Crofters)	Gavin Brown Clark	1,828	77.6	+2.1
Liberal Unionist	John Cowper	528	22.4	−2.1
Majority		1,300	55.2	+4.2
Turnout		2,356	59.3	−12.5
Registered electors		3,976		
Liberal hold		Swing	+2.1	

=== Elections in the 1900s ===
General election 1900: Caithness-shire
Party	Candidate	Votes	%	±%
Liberal	Leicester Harmsworth	1,189	37.5	−40.1
Conservative	David Patrick Henderson	1,161	36.7	+14.3
Crofters	Gavin Brown Clark	673	21.3	−56.3
Land Law Reform Association of Caithness	F.C. Auld	141	4.5	New
Majority		28	0.8	−54.4
Turnout		3,164	78.3	+19.0
Registered electors		4,043		
Liberal hold		Swing	−27.2	

General election 1906: Caithness-shire
Party	Candidate	Votes	%	±%
Liberal	Leicester Harmsworth	2,686	84.8	+47.3
Conservative	Keith Fraser	483	15.2	−21.5
Majority		2,203	69.6	+68.8
Turnout		3,169	77.5	−0.8
Registered electors		4,091		
Liberal hold		Swing	+34.4	

=== Elections in the 1910s ===
General election January 1910: Caithness-shire
Party	Candidate	Votes	%	±%
Liberal	Leicester Harmsworth	2,643	81.8	−3.0
Conservative	Laurence Strain	590	18.2	+3.0
Majority		2,053	63.6	−6.0
Turnout		3,233	82.0	+4.5
Liberal hold		Swing	-3.0	

Harmsworth

General election December 1910: Caithness-shire
Party	Candidate	Votes	%	±%
Liberal	Leicester Harmsworth	2,718	96.9	+15.1
Ind. Conservative	Archibald Macleod	87	3.1	New
Majority		2,631	93.8	+30.2
Turnout		2,805	66.8	−15.2
Liberal hold				

General Election 1914–15:

Another General Election was required to take place before the end of 1915. The political parties had been making preparations for an election to take place and by July 1914, the following candidates had been selected;

- Liberal: Leicester Harmsworth
- Unionist:

== Sources ==
- Leigh Rayment's Historical List of MPs – Constituencies beginning with "B" (part 6)
- Leigh Rayment's Historical List of MPs – Constituencies beginning with "C" (part 1)
