= Augustus Buckland =

British divine and writer

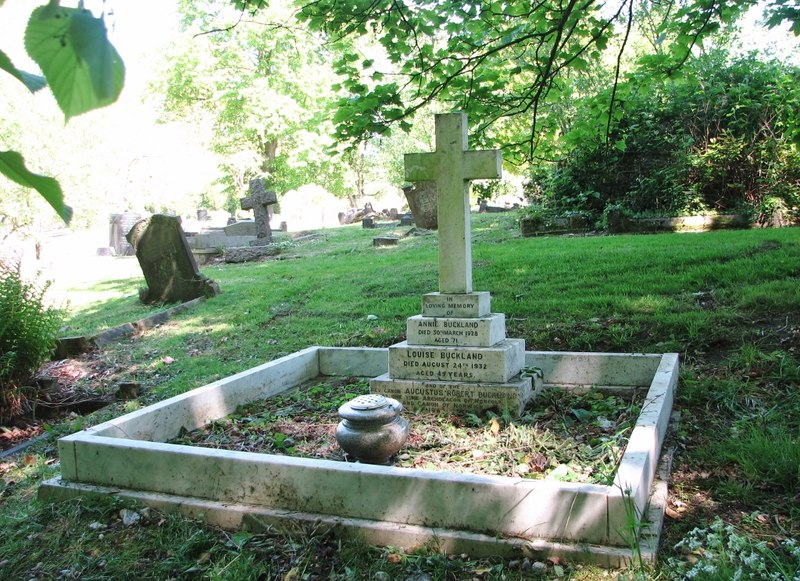
Grave at Rosary Cemetery

Rev. Augustus Robert Buckland (18 April 1857 – 8 April 1942) was a British divine and writer.

== Early years ==
He was born at Newport in Monmouthshire and educated at Pembroke College, Oxford (B.A., 1881), and was ordained to the priesthood of the Church of England in 1881.

== Marriage and family ==
In 1883, Buckland married Annie Smith, daughter of David Smith. The couple had one son and three daughters.

== Curate and writer ==
Buckland was curate of Spitalfields, London, in 1880–84. In 1887 he became editor of the Record and subsequently engaged largely in journalistic work. He became morning preacher in the Foundling Hospital, London in 1890, and was secretary of the Religious Tract Society from 1902 to 1917.

He was then Rector of Pulham at St. Mary Magdalene, 1917–1927, Archdeacon of Norfolk, 1920–1934, Residentiary Canon of Norwich, 1927–1934, and Honorary Canon of Norwich, 1935. He visited China and Japan in 1908.

He was editor of The Record from 1887 to 1908 and in 1901 succeeded William McDonald Sinclair as editor of the Churchman, filling the post until 1902, when he was succeeded by Henry Wace.

He wrote: Strayed East (London, 1889); The Patience of Two (1894); The Heroic in Missions (1894); John Horden, Missionary Bishop : a life on the shores of Hudson's Bay (1894); Women in the Mission Field (1895); The Confessional in the English Church (1900); The Missionary Speaker's Manual (1901, in collaboration with J. D. Mullins); Editor of Universal Bible Dictionary (1914); John Bunyan, The Man and his Work (1928); and George Anthony King. Knight (1928). In addition, he edited many works for the Religious Tract Society, notably its Devotional Commentary.

He died on 8 April 1942 in a nursing home in Diss, Norfolk and was buried at Rosary Cemetery on 11 April, following a funeral service at the Norwich Cathedral.
