= Holiday House (novel) =

1839 novel by Catherine Sinclair

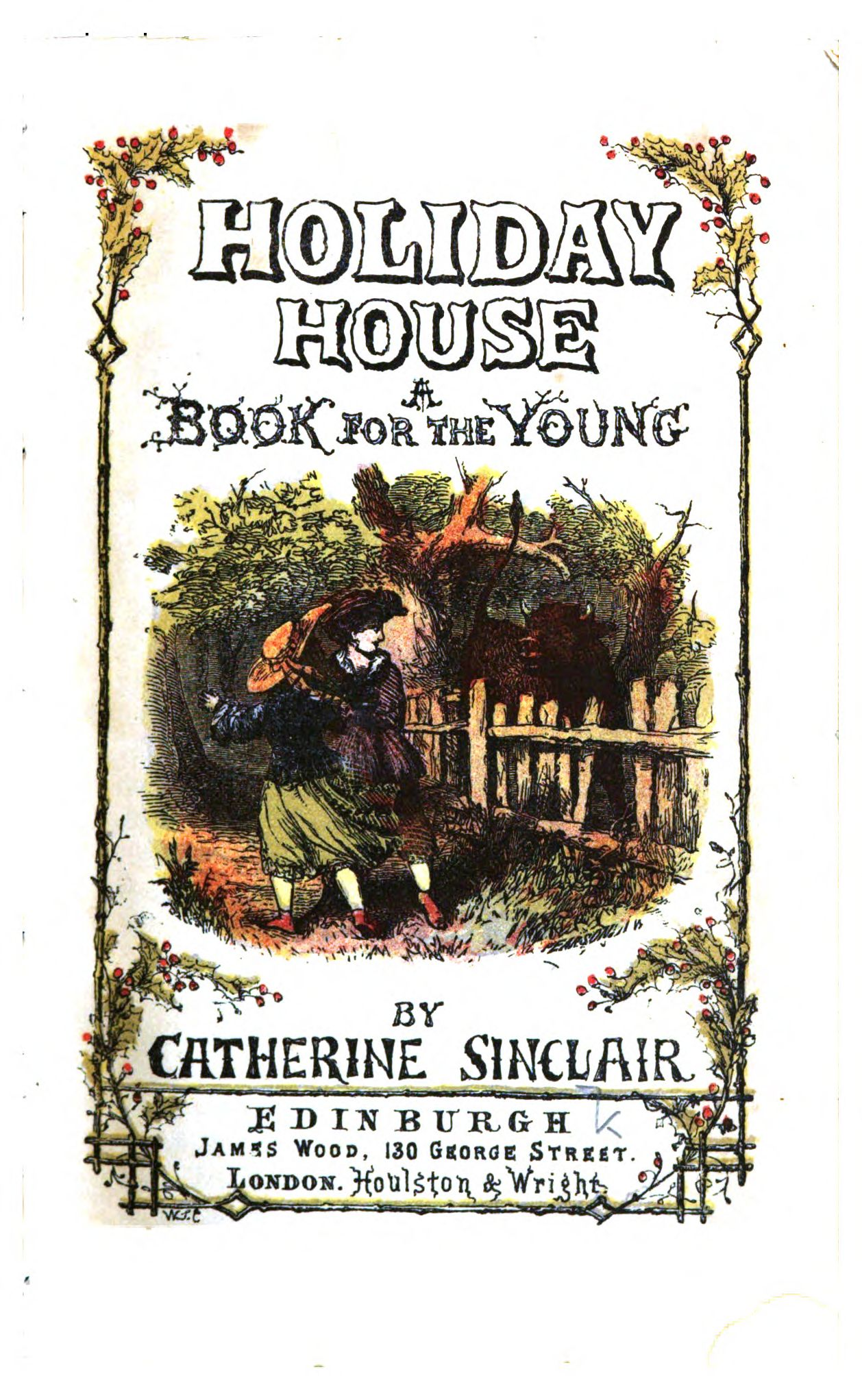
- 1865 edition
- Author: Catherine Sinclair
- Published: 1839
- Publisher: William Whyte & Co.
- Publication place: Scotland

Holiday House: A Book for the Young is a novel by Catherine Sinclair. It was first published in Edinburgh by William Whyte & Co. in 1839.

Holiday House is set in Edinburgh at some point before 1815. It tells the story of siblings Laura, Harry, and Frank Graham, who live with their uncle and grandmother. Their mother is dead and their father is out of the country.

The narrative is constructed around two sets of episodes. The first focusses on Laura and Harry's misbehaviour; the second emphasises their growing maturity. In the second portion of the narrative, Frank joins the navy, falls ill, and dies. Frank's death ends Laura and Harry's childish mischief and turns them toward a Christian ethic.

In her preface to the novel, Sinclair rejects the didacticism that had dominated children's literature in English since the late 18th century. She writes that Holiday House aims to show characters who exemplify "that species of noisy, frolicsome, mischievous children, now almost extinct". Critics have viewed Holiday House as a transitional work between this earlier period and later children's fiction by authors including Lewis Carroll, and have explored its gendered portrayal of childhood as preparation for imperial careers.

== Works cited ==
- Avery, Gillian (1975). Childhood's Pattern: A Study of the Heroes and Heroines of Children's Fiction, 1770–1950. Hodder & Stoughton. ISBN 0-340-16945-1. OCLC 2048422.
- Hahn, Daniel (2015). The Oxford Companion to Children's Literature (2d ed.). Oxford University Press. ISBN 978-0-19-174437-2. OCLC 921452204.
- Hoffman, A. Robin (2013). "Holiday House, Childhood, and the End(s) of Time". Children's Literature. 41 (1): 115–139. doi:10.1353/chl.2013.0019. ISSN 1543-3374.
- Horne, Jackie C. (2001). "Punishment as Performance in Catherine Sinclair's Holiday House". Children's Literature Association Quarterly. 26 (1): 22–32. doi:10.1353/chq.0.1362. ISSN 1553-1201.
- Lesnik-Oberstein, Karin (2002). "Holiday House: Grist to The Mill on the Floss, or Childhood as Text". The Yearbook of English Studies. 32: 77–94. doi:10.2307/3509049. JSTOR 3509049.
- Rudd, David (2004). "The Froebellious Child in Catherine Sinclair's Holiday House". The Lion and the Unicorn. 28 (1): 53–69. doi:10.1353/uni.2004.0009. ISSN 1080-6563. S2CID 143506505.
- Valint, Alexandra (2011). "Mischief, Gender, and Empire: Raising Imperial Bachelors and Spinsters in Catherine Sinclair'sHoliday House". Children's Literature Association Quarterly. 36 (1): 64–88. doi:10.1353/chq.2011.0004.
- Wolff, Robert Lee (1975). "Some Erring Children in Children's Literature: The World of Victorian Religious Strife in Miniature". In Buckley, Jerome Hamilton (ed.). The Worlds of Victorian Fiction. Harvard University Press. ISBN 0-674-96205-2. OCLC 1218594.
