= Sir John Sinclair, 3rd Baronet =

Scottish landowner and politician

Sir John Sinclair, Bt
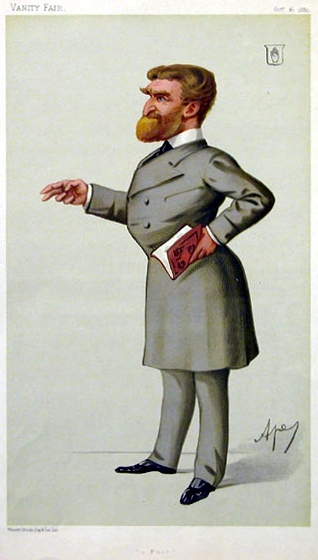
- "A Poet", Sinclair as caricatured by Ape, October 1880

Member of Parliament for Caithness
- In office 1869–1885
- Preceded by: George Traill
- Succeeded by: Gavin Brown Clark

Personal details
- Born: John George Tollemache Sinclair; 8 November 1825 Edinburgh, Scotland
- Died: 30 September 1912 (aged 86)
- Spouse: Emma Standish (m. 1853; div. 1878)
- Relations: Sir William Talmash, 1st Baronet (grandfather)
- Parent(s): Sir George Sinclair, 2nd Baronet; Lady Catherine Camilla Tollemache
- Education: Cheam School, University of Durham

Sir John George Tollemache Sinclair, 3rd Baronet (8 November 1825 – 30 September 1912) was a Scottish landowner and Liberal politician who sat in the House of Commons from 1869 to 1885.

== Early life ==
Born in Edinburgh in 1825, he was the son of Sir George Sinclair, 2nd Baronet, and Lady Catherine Camilla Tollemache, daughter of William Talmash, Lord Huntingtower. He was a Page of Honour for Queen Adelaide.

Sinclair was educated at Cheam School and the University of Durham.

== Career ==
He served as a lieutenant in the Scots Fusilier Guards. In 1861 he was made Vice-Lieutenant for Caithness.

In 1868 he succeeded his father to the baronetcy. Sinclair was elected member of parliament for Caithness in 1869 and held the seat until 1885. His majority of 13 over the Conservative candidate at the 1874 election is one of the smallest on record. At the 1885 General election, his son Clarence succeeded him as Liberal candidate, but was defeated by Gavin Brown Clark, the Crofters' Party candidate.

== Personal life ==
In 1853, Sinclair married Emma Standish, daughter of William Standish, Duxbury Park, Lancashire, and Cocken Hall, Durham. Before their marriage was dissolved in 1878, the couple had two sons and two daughters:

- Amy Camilla Sinclair (c. 1854–1925), who married John Henry Udny of Udny Castle, grandson of diplomat John Udny.
- Nina Mary Adelaide Sinclair (1856–1924), who married Owen Lewis Cope Williams, son of Lt.-Col. Thomas Peers Williams.
- Clarence Granville Sinclair (1858–1895), who married American heiress Mabel Sands, daughter of Mahlon Day Sands, and half-sister of Ethel Sands.
- George Felix Standish Sinclair JP (1861–1943), who married Margaret Sinclair, a daughter of Alexander Young Sinclair (son of Sir John Sinclair, 6th Baronet).

Sir John died on 30 September 1912. As he was predeceased by his eldest son Clarence, he was succeeded in the baronetcy by his grandson Archibald Henry Macdonald Sinclair, who was later created Viscount Thurso in 1952.

=== Interests ===
Sinclair was the earliest born person to have made a gramophone disc recording. He made titles for Columbia, Gramophone and Typewriter Ltd. and Odeon, all in 1906. He also commissioned a statue of Mary, Queen of Scots, at 143–144 Fleet Street, London.

Parliament of the United Kingdom
Preceded by George Traill	Member of Parliament for Caithness; 1869–1885	Succeeded by Gavin Brown Clark
Baronetage of Great Britain
Preceded by George Sinclair	Baronet (of Ulbster); 1868–1912	Succeeded by Archibald Sinclair
