= John Sinclair (archdeacon of Middlesex) =

Religious author (1797–1875)

6 Charlotte Square, now known as Bute House, and now the official residence of the First Minister of Scotland

The Rev John Sinclair FRSE (20 August 1797 - 22 May 1875) was a religious author and amateur biologist. He served as Archdeacon of Middlesex from 1844 until his death.

== Life ==
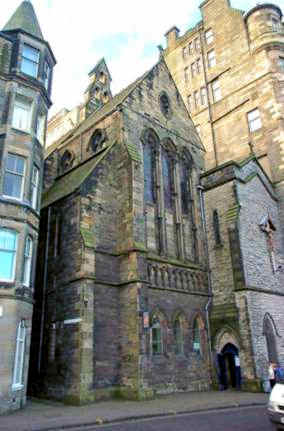
Old St Pauls Edinburgh

He was the son of Sir John Sinclair, 1st Baronet of Ulbster, and his second wife, Diana Macdonald, daughter of Alexander Macdonald, 1st Baron Macdonald. He was born at 9 Charlotte Square in Edinburgh but the family moved to 6 Charlotte Square around 1810.

He studied Divinity at Pembroke College, Oxford, graduating BA in 1819. There he was one of the founders of the Rhetorical Society. He was made a Deacon in 1820 and ordained as a priest in 1821 and spent one year at Sutterby in Lincolnshire. In 1822 he joined his parents in Edinburgh and took a post of Incumbent at Old St Paul's Church on Jeffrey Street.

In 1829 he was elected a Fellow of the Royal Society of Edinburgh (for his contributions to biology). His proposer was Archibald Alison. In 1839 he left Old St Paul's to be Secretary of the National Bible Society of Scotland.

In Edinburgh he lived at his late father's house at 133 George Street.

He was appointed Vicar of Kensington in 1842, a post he held while also archdeacon.

His private secretary in later life was George Charles Silk (b. 1822), a close friend of Alfred Russel Wallace.

He died in Kensington on 22 May 1875.

== Family ==
He was unmarried and had no children

His sister was the author Catherine Sinclair.

== Publications ==
- Dissertation Vindicating the Church of England (1836)
- The Life and Times of the Right Hon John Sinclair (1837) a biography of his father

== Notes ==
Church of England titles
Preceded by John Lonsdale	Archdeacon of Middlesex; 1844–1875	Succeeded by James Hessey
