= Lucas White King =

Anglo-Irish colonial administrator and academic

Sir Lucas White King CSI FSA
- Born: 8 September 1856; Madras, British India
- Died: 23 August 1925 (aged 68)
- Education: Ennis College, Trinity College, Dublin (BA, LLB)
- Occupations: colonial administrator and academic
- Known for: Professor of Oriental Languages at Trinity College, Dublin
- Notable work: commissioner, Rawalpindi Division, Indian Civil Service
- Spouse: Geraldine Adelaide Hamilton Harmsworth
- Children: 3 sons, 4 daughters
- Father: Henry King (Deputy Surgeon-General)
- Awards: knighted in 1919

Sir Lucas White King CSI FSA (8 September 1856 – 23 August 1925) was an Anglo-Irish colonial administrator and academic, Professor of Oriental Languages at Trinity College, Dublin from 1905 to 1922.

== Early life ==
He was born in Madras, British India, on 8 September 1856, the eldest son of the Deputy Surgeon-General Henry King, also the Principal of the Medical School in Madras.

He was educated at Ennis College and Trinity College, Dublin, where he received BA and LLB degrees in 1878.

== Career ==
In 1878, he joined the Indian Civil Service, rising to commissioner of the Rawalpindi Division, until his retirement in 1905.

In 1905, he was appointed professor of Oriental languages (the Chair of Arabic, Persian and Hindustani) at Dublin University, a post he held until 1922 when he resigned and went to live in London.

He was knighted in 1919.

== Personal life ==
He married Geraldine Adelaide Hamilton Harmsworth (1866-1945), eldest daughter of Alfred Harmsworth and his wife, Geraldine, and sister of newspaper proprietors Alfred Harmsworth, 1st Viscount Northcliffe, and Harold Sidney Harmsworth, 1st Viscount Rothermere.

They had issue:

- Elinor Mary Kathleen King
- Sheila Geraldine King
- Lucas Henry St. Aubyn King
- Enid Madeleine King, married Herbert Bland Stokes, youngest son of Sir Gabriel Stokes
- Cecil Harmsworth King, chairman of Daily Mirror Newspapers, Sunday Pictorial Newspapers and the International Publishing Corporation, and a director at the Bank of England
- Alfred Curzon White King
- Geraldine Sophie White King

Coat of arms of Lucas White King

Notes
Confirmed 3 April 1901 by Sir Arthur Vicars, Ulster King of Arms.
Crest
On a wreath of the colours a dexter hand couped at the wrist and erect the third and fourth fingers turned down Proper charged on the wrist with an estoile as in the arms.
Escutcheon
Gules two lions rampant combatant supporting a dexter hand couped and the wrist and erect above it an estoile Argent a bordure Ermines.
Motto
Spes Tutissima Coelio
