= Answers (periodical) =

British newspaper

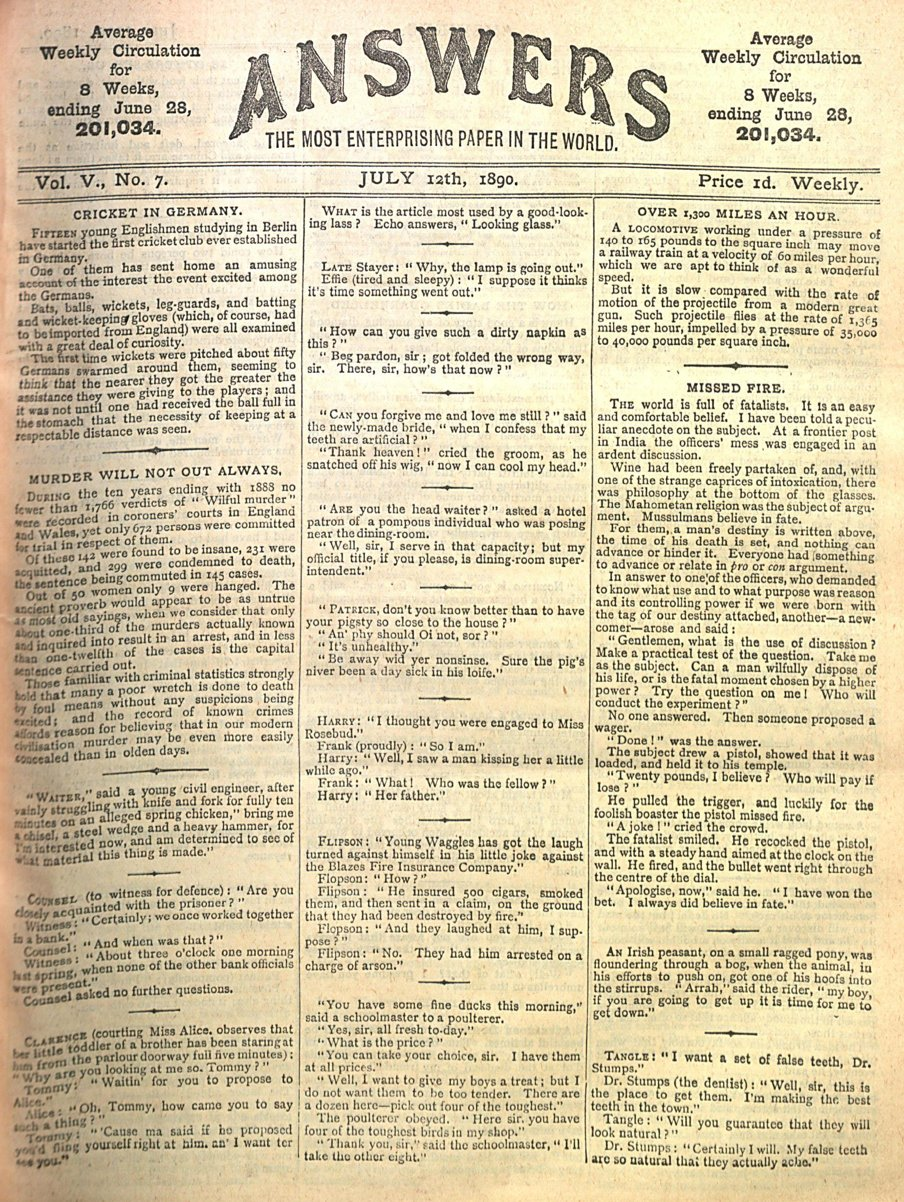
Cover page of an issue of Answers from July 12, 1890.

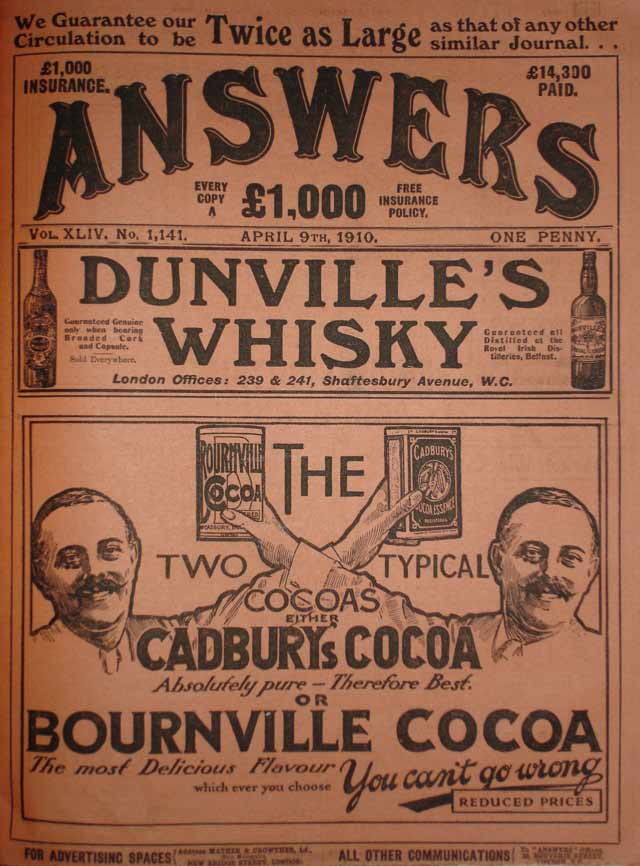
An issue from April 9, 1910.

Answers was a British weekly paper founded in 1888 by Alfred Harmsworth (later Lord Northcliffe). Originally titled Answers to Correspondents, before being shortened soon after, it initially consisted largely of answers to reader-submitted questions, along with articles on miscellaneous topics, jokes, and serialized literature. Its content was similar to and inspired by Tit-Bits (which carried a section called 'Answers to Correspondents'), a popular British weekly founded in 1881 which appealed to a wide audience of newly literate Britons.

It was the first periodical founded by Northcliffe (who was 23 years old at the time of its founding), who would go on to become a publishing magnate, later founding and acquiring a number of highly successful and influential periodicals, including the Daily Mail. Northcliffe employed his brother, Harold Harmsworth, as business manager for the paper.

Answers was twelve pages in length, and was priced at 1d each.

== Contents ==
Answers purported to answer questions submitted by readers, though many were written under false names by Northcliffe or plagiarized from American sources. Example topics included 'Can Monkeys Smoke?', 'How to Cure Freckles', 'Why Jews Don't Ride Bicycles', 'How Madmen Write', 'What the Queen Eats', and 'Can Insects Feel Pain?'. The paper also included humorous anecdotes, quotations, and jokes (example: "There is a man in Birmingham who has been asleep seven years. This, we believe, beats the best yet done by any member of the Metropolitan Police Force").

Answers included serialized fiction, which Northcliffe was said to sometimes rewrite himself to ensure that each part ended on a cliffhanger with the line "To be continued".

== Promotions ==
Answers failed to turn a profit during its initial months of publication, but Northcliffe was able to effectively increase the paper's circulation by the use of a variety of promotional gimmicks. Northcliffe sold a number of branded novelties, among the first being a "Pigs in Clover" puzzle, a form of ball-in-a-maze puzzle, with colored marbles spelling out 'Answers' when rolled into the correct holes. Other merchandise included fountain pens, patent medicines,, pipes and coffee.

Northcliffe also conducted a number of promotional competitions. One of the most successful, credited with raising circulation to 200,000 per week, offered £1 per week for life to the reader who could most accurately guess the total value of gold and silver stored in the Bank of England on a certain date. The competition received 718,218 entries. Northcliffe required each entry to bear the signatures of five witnesses as a way to further increase the number of people exposed to Answers' brand.

== Later history ==
Answers is thought to have attained a maximum circulation of 830,000 in 1906. The magazine's final issue was dated 18 February 1956, by which point it had rebranded itself Answers & TV Pic.
