= Alfred Harmsworth (barrister) =

British barrister

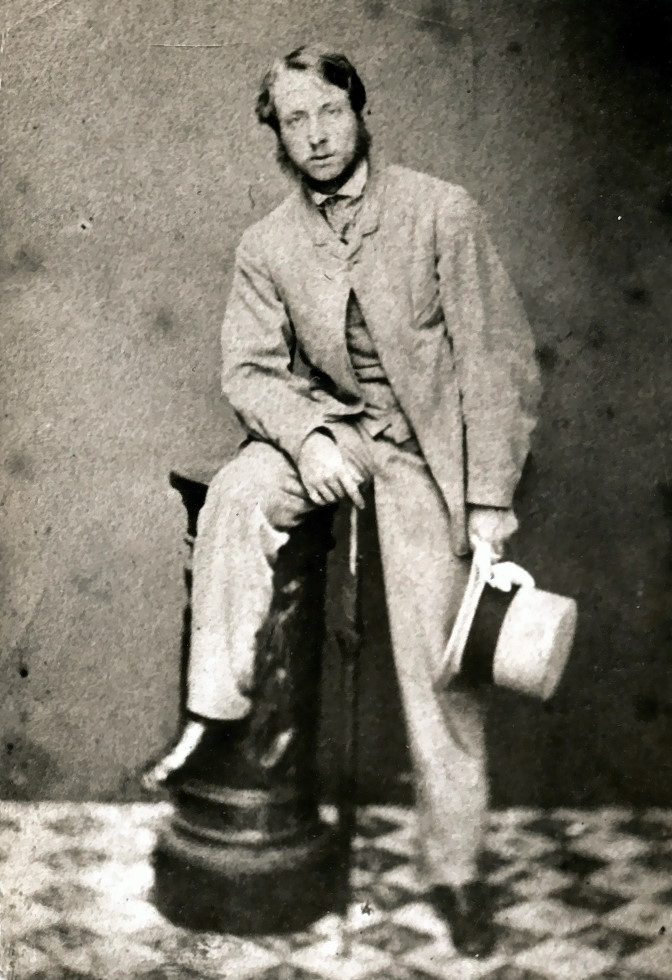
- Alfred Harmsworth
- Born: 3 July 1837; Marylebone, London, United Kingdom of Great Britain and Ireland
- Died: 16 July 1889 (aged 52); Brondesbury, London, United Kingdom of Great Britain and Ireland
- Resting place: East Finchley Cemetery
- Occupation: Barrister
- Spouse: Geraldine Maffett (1864–1889)
- Children: 14

Alfred Harmsworth (3 July 1837 – 16 July 1889) was a British barrister, and the father of several of the United Kingdom's leading newspaper proprietors, five of whom were honoured with hereditary titles – two viscounts, one baron and two baronets. Another son designed the iconic bulbous Perrier mineral water bottle.

== Early life ==
Alfred Harmsworth was born on 3 July 1837 in Marylebone, London, the only son of Charles Harmsworth and Hannah Carter.

== Family ==
On 21 September 1864, at St Stephen's Church, Dublin, he married Geraldine Maffett, one of the eight children of William Maffett, a land agent in County Down, and his second wife Margaret Finlayson.

They lived in Dublin until 1867, when they moved to London, initially to St John's Wood, and later to Hampstead when the family's fortunes declined, in part due to Harmsworth's "fondness for alcohol", although they were always short of money, in part due to having so many children.

The Harmsworths had 14 children (ten sons and four daughters), three of whom died in infancy:

- Alfred Harmsworth, 1st Viscount Northcliffe (1865–1922)
- Geraldine Adelaide Hamilton Harmsworth (1866–1945), married Sir Lucas White King, mother of Cecil Harmsworth King
- Harold Harmsworth, 1st Viscount Rothermere (1868–1940)
- Cecil Harmsworth, 1st Baron Harmsworth (1869–1948)
- Sir Leicester Harmsworth, 1st Baronet (1870–1937)
- Sir Hildebrand Harmsworth, 1st Baronet (1872–1929)
- Violet Grace Harmsworth (1873–1961), married Wilfrid Wild
- Charles Harmondsworth Harmsworth (1874–1942)
- William Albert St John Harmsworth (1876–1933)
- Maud Sarah Harmsworth (1877–1878)
- Christabel Rose Harmsworth (1880–1967), mother of Christabel Bielenberg (nee Burton), Nazi resistance figure
- Vyvyan George Harmsworth (1881–1957)
- Muriel Harmsworth (1882–1882) (despite the name, Muriel was a boy)
- Harry Stanley Giffard Harmsworth (1885–1887)

In 1939, there were five women entitled to the style of Lady Harmsworth.

== Career ==
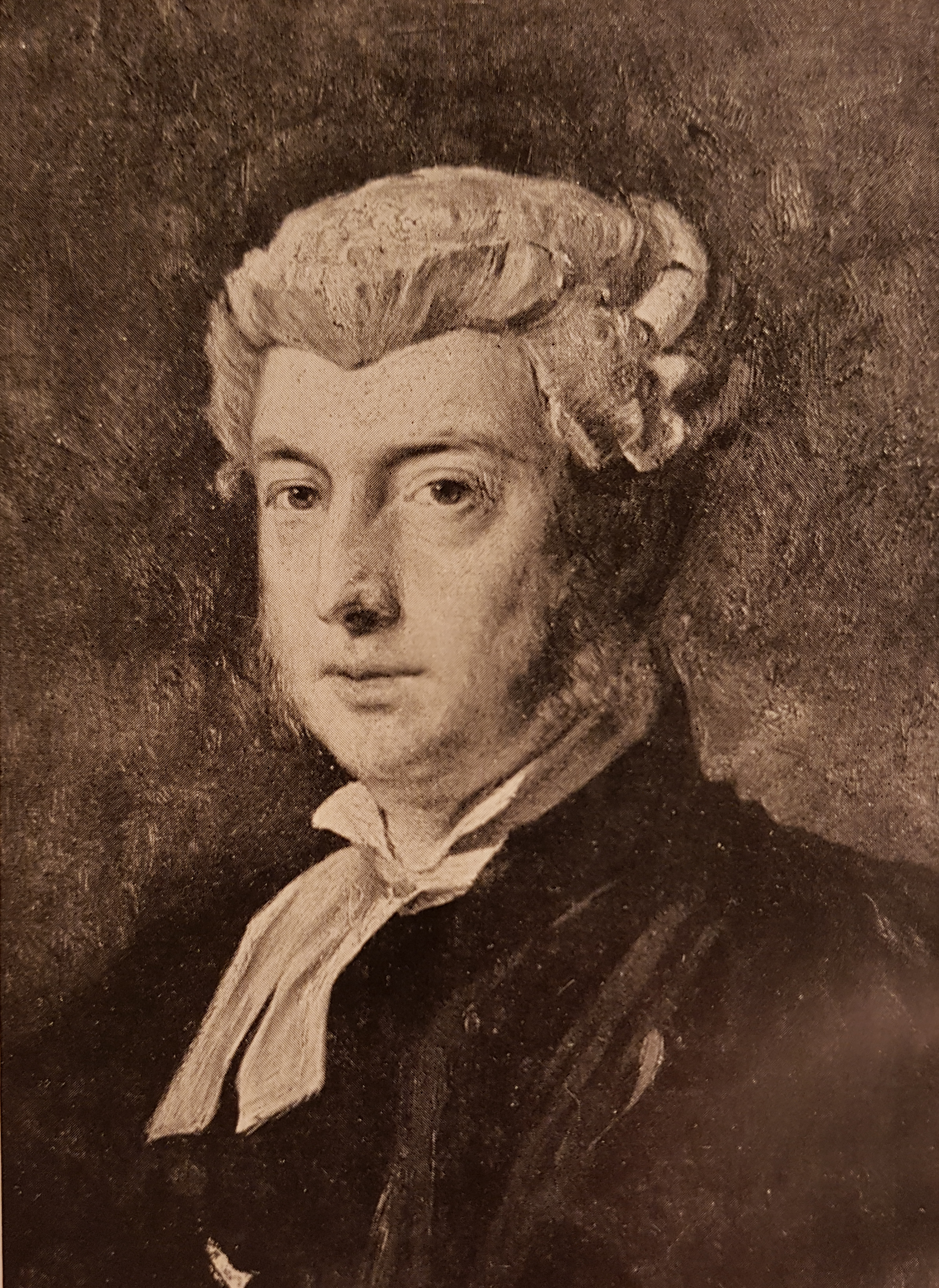
Alfred Harmsworth by Seymour Lucas, R.A.

Harmsworth was a barrister of the Middle Temple and one of the standing counsel for the Great Northern Railway. He has been described as an "unsuccessful" barrister. It was not until after his death that the press empire created by his sons "really took off". Harmsworth was the founder of the Sylvan Debating Club, for which he served as Secretary for a number of years.

== Death ==
Harmsworth died on 16 July 1889. He is buried at East Finchley Cemetery. He died of cirrhosis of the liver, as did his son Hildebrand, both in their 50s.

== See also ==
- Harmsworth baronets
