= Geraldine Harmsworth =

Irish matriarch (1838–1925)

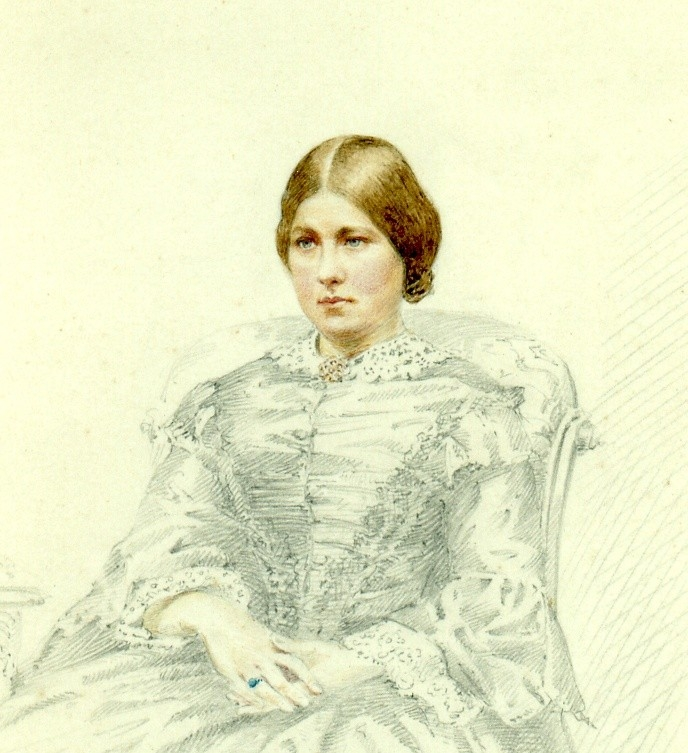
- Born: Geraldine Mary Maffett; 24 December 1838; Dublin, Ireland
- Died: 29 August 1925 (aged 86); London, England
- Spouse: Alfred Harmsworth (1864–1889)
- Children: 14

Geraldine Mary Harmsworth (née Maffett; 24 December 1838 – 29 August 1925) was an Irish matriarch.

== Early life ==
Geraldine Mary Maffett was born in Dublin on 24 December 1838. Her parents were William and Margaret Maffett (née Finlayson). She had 7 siblings and 3 half siblings from her father's first marriage to Margaret Crooks. Two of her brothers went on to join the British Army. Her father was a land agent, and the family lived at 27 Pembroke Place (later Pembroke Road), Dublin. At a young age, Harmsworth was a talented singer and piano player, who apparently could memorise the operas she heard performed in Dublin. She was educated by German and French governesses. The family later moved to a house named St Helena, Finglas. It was here that Harmsworth met her future husband, Alfred Harmsworth, in 1862. Her father approved of the match, and she decided that her new husband would become a barrister. They married on 22 September 1864 in St Stephen's Church, Dublin.

== Family ==
By the time of their marriage, Alfred was a student of the Middle Temple and was studying to take the Irish bar. Their first two children were born in Dublin. Harmsworth decided that the family should move to London, and this was hastened by the rumour that her husband was potentially being targeted by the Fenians. They first lived with relatives in Dublin, Armagh and Belfast, leaving in March 1867 for London. Her husband was a heavy drinker, but was called to the English and Irish bars, and founded the Sylvan Debating Club.

His alcoholism left the growing family in straitened circumstances, with the family moving into a series of cheaper and cheaper houses in north London. Harmsworth was untrained as a housewife, and struggled to maintain their homes. Their children wore secondhand clothes, she wrapped them in newspapers at night to keep them warm, and when infants, the children would sleep in a drawer. She occasionally escaped the home to participate in public readings of literature.

The couple had 14 children, three of whom died in infancy.

- Alfred Charles William (1865–1922)
- Geraldine Adelaide Hamilton (1866–1945) mother of Cecil Harmsworth King, wife of Sir Lucas White King
- Harold Sidney (1868–1940)
- Cecil Bisshopp (1869–1948)
- Robert Leicester (1870–1937)
- Hildebrand Aubrey (1872–1929)
- Violet Grace (1873–1961)
- Charles Harmondsworth (1874–1942)
- William Albert St John (1876–1933)
- Maud Sarah (1877–1878)
- Christabel Rose (1880–1967), mother of Christabel Bielenberg
- Vyvyan George (1881–1957)
- Muriel (1882–1882)
- Harry Stanley Giffard (1885–1887)

Her husband died of cirrhosis of the liver in 1889. Harmsworth remained devoted to the memory of her husband. She and her son, Alfred, were very close with some thinking the relationship dysfunctionally intense. He was determined to support his mother, and alongside his brothers, he entered the newspaper business. He bought Harmsworth a house first in Maida Vale, secondly at 2 Cumberland Place, Marble Arch, and finally Poynters Hall at Totteridge. He gave her a stipend of £6,000 a year. She kept her homes well staffed and alcohol free. With her son Alfred and his wife, Harmsworth was hosted at the White House by President Theodore Roosevelt who was impressed by her. During this visit, she refused to visit the tomb of George Washington stating "she would not pay tribute to a rebel".

Alfred wrote to his mother at least once a day while he travelled, kept his watch set to "Totteridge time", and visited her every day when he was in London. He often stayed the night, in a room next to hers, and he named his newspaper headquarters "Geraldine House". When he died in 1922, Harmsworth repeatedly stated "It is the Lord's will, it is the Lord's will". He bequeathed her 8% of his £2,000,000 fortune. Along with her son Harold, she endowed Middle Temple with £60,000 in memory of her husband. Harmsworth died on 29 August 1925, and is buried beside her son Alfred in St Marylebone Cemetery, Finchley at his request. Harold purchased a 15-acre site, formerly the Bethlem Royal Hospital, beside the Imperial War Museum in 1926 and founded the Geraldine Mary Harmsworth Park. The Park was opened in 1934.
