= Harmsworth Popular Science =

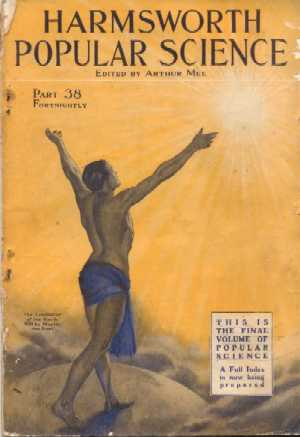
Cover of the final issue

Harmsworth Popular Science was a fortnightly (14 days) series of magazine publications forming an encyclopaedic series of science and technology articles published in the early years of the 20th century, and completed about 1913.

It was humanist and modernist in tone, and supported the then-fashionable ideas of eugenics and free market economics. Britain (especially Birmingham) was then considered by the British people to be "the workshop of the world" and the magazine duly celebrated British technical and cultural innovation from Charles Darwin to Guglielmo Marconi.

== Editions ==
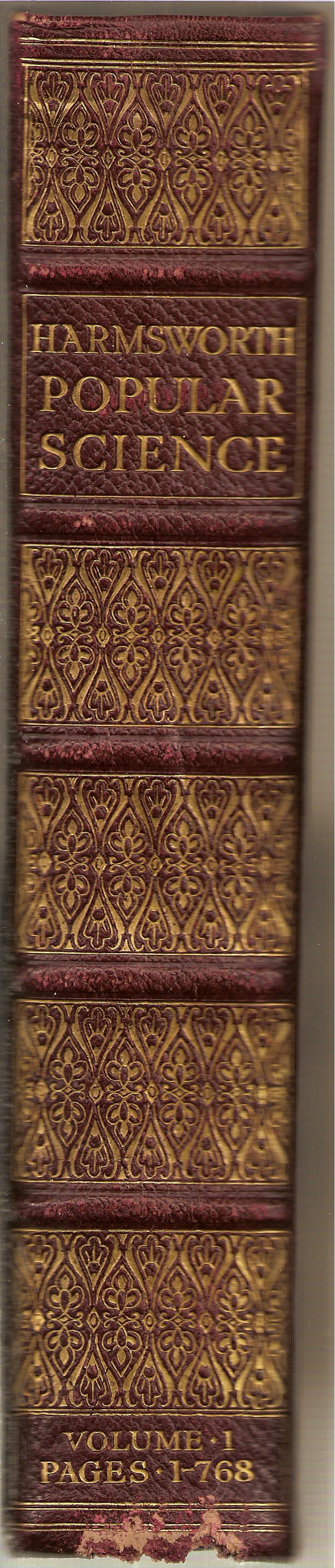
Spine of a Harmsworth Popular Science volume, c. 1913

There may have been several bound editions of Harmsworth Popular Science, (probably containing edited reprints of magazine articles) and one of them (undated) is in red cloth and leather completed in seven volumes. The edition was edited by Arthur Mee and published in London by the Educational Book Company (see Flysheet illustration below). Volume One contained a foreword entitled "The Story of This Book" which outlines the various groups:

- Group 1: The Universe, "The Making of worlds" which speculates about the place of Earth in Creation
- Group 2: The Earth, "The Earth we live on" which starts with 'a molten ball of iron...'
- Group 3: Life, "Life takes possession" which is Darwinian in tone
- Group 4: Plant Life, "The Earth Alive" which has a pre-creationist style "The Hand that made..."
- Group 5: Animal Life, "The forerunners of Man" describes fossils to speculates about earlier intelligent life forms
- Group 6: Man, "Man Appears" speculated about the origin and evolution of human brains
- Group 7: Health, "Man Builds up Strength" covers sanitation, diet and modern medicine such as X-ray and contained biographies on 500 scientists and a bibliography of 1000 scientific books.
- Group 8: Power, "Man finds Power" covers steam, and 'new' central generation of electricity
- Group 9: Industry, "Man Uses Power" Britain as the workshop of the world was its theme
- Group 10: Commerce, "Man Buys and Sells" and the dawn of world trade "America sells cotton..."
- Group 11: Society, "Man organizes society" foresees "The Federation of the World"
- Group 12: Eugenics "Man Creates The Future" discredited by Nazi Human breeding programs, this section is full of hope that "our children (will pass through) the Gates of Dawn"

== Editors ==
As well as Arthur Mee, the editors included:

- Caleb Williams Saleeby, Fellow of the Royal Society of Edinburgh, Doctor of medicine, Scientific author, lecturer at the Royal Institution
- Leo Chiozza Money, Member of Parliament (of GB) Author and political economist
- W Beach Thomas, journalist and agricultural expert
- John Derry, journalist and educationalist (1854-1937)
- Edward Wright, writer on philosophy
- Gerald Leighton, professor of pathology and bacteriology at the University of Edinburgh (1868-1953)
- T Thorn Baker, electrical expert, lecturer at the Royal Institution
- Henry Hamilton Fyfe, author and journalist
- Ernest A Bryant, author of the natural history section of The Children's Encyclopædia
- Ronald Campbell Macfie, Master of Arts, author of "Science Matter and Material"
- Joseph Horner, author of technical works; member of the Institute of Mechanical Engineers

== Gallery ==
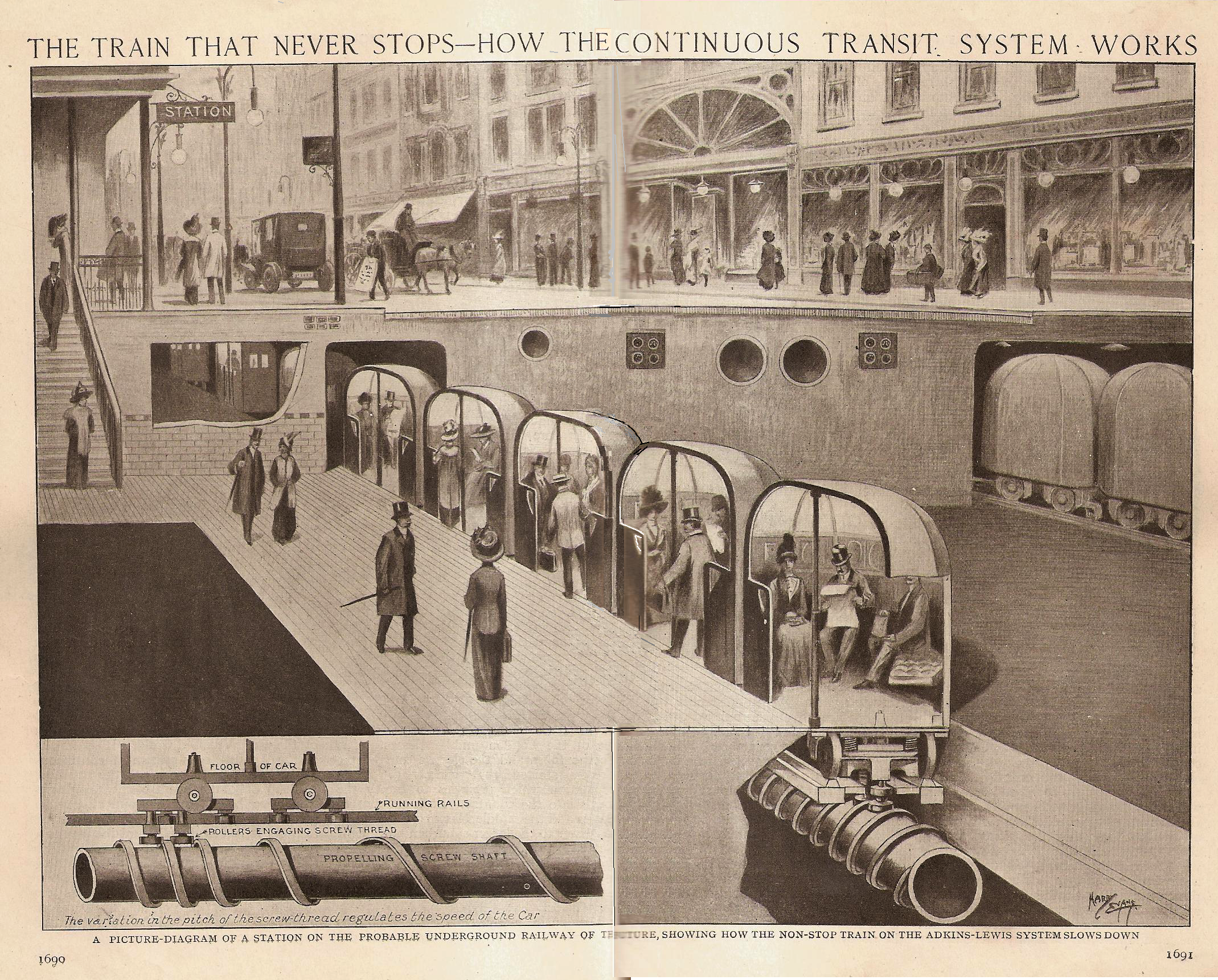
Typical double-page spread from Volume Three

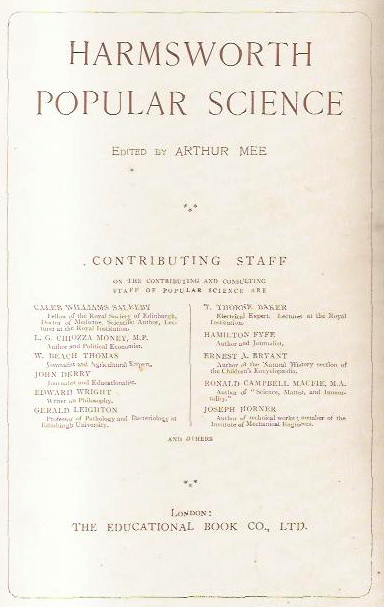
Title page from Volume One
