= Cecil Harmsworth King =

British publisher

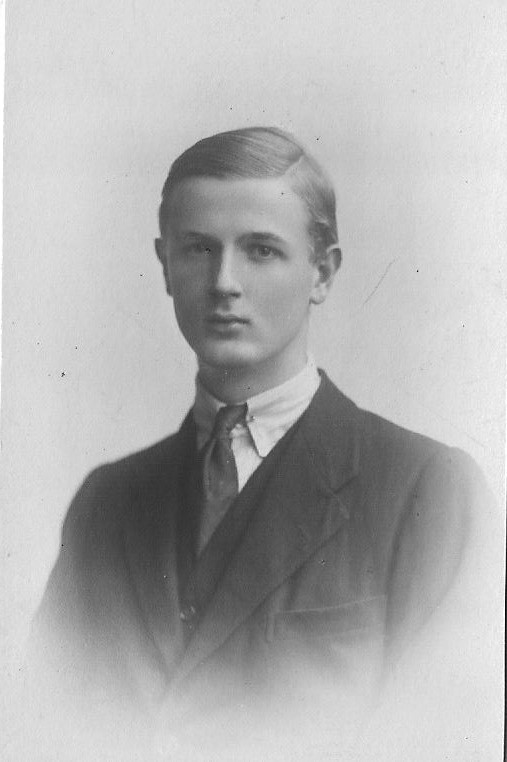
- King aged c. 19 years
- Born: 20 February 1901; Poynters Hall, Totteridge, Hertfordshire, England
- Died: 17 April 1987 (aged 86); Dublin, Ireland
- Education: Winchester College; Christ Church, Oxford
- Occupation: Publisher
- Spouses: Agnes Margaret Cooke (m. 1923; div. 1958) Dame Ruth Railton (m. 1962)
- Children: 4
- Parent: Sir Lucas White King

Cecil Harmsworth King (20 February 1901 – 17 April 1987) was Chairman of Daily Mirror Newspapers, Sunday Pictorial Newspapers and the International Publishing Corporation (1963–1968) and a director at the Bank of England (1965–1968).

== Biography ==
=== Early life ===
Cecil Harmsworth King was born on 20 February 1901 at Poynters Hall, Totteridge, Hertfordshire, the home of his grandmother, Geraldine Mary Harmsworth. He came on his father's side from a Protestant Irish family and was brought up in Ireland. His father was Sir Lucas White King, Professor of Oriental Languages at Trinity College, Dublin, and his mother was Geraldine Adelaide Hamilton (née Harmsworth), daughter of Alfred Harmsworth, a barrister, and sister of the mass-circulation newspaper proprietors Alfred Harmsworth, 1st Viscount Northcliffe and Harold Sidney Harmsworth, 1st Viscount Rothermere.

The fourth child in a family of three sons and three daughters, he was educated at Winchester College and Christ Church, Oxford. According to Geoffrey Goodman: "He believed he was born to rule, an image of himself which never departed."

=== Career ===
In 1937, he was an advertising director of one of his uncle's newspapers when he partnered with journalist Hugh Cudlipp. When he was made a senior director, he chose Cudlipp as his new editor. At the age of 23, Cudlipp became the youngest chief editor in Fleet Street. Between them, both men turned the Daily Mirror into the world's largest-selling daily paper. In 1967, the Daily Mirror reached a world record circulation of 5,282,137 copies.

By 1963, King chaired the International Publishing Corporation (IPC), then the biggest publishing empire in the world, which included the Daily Mirror and some two hundred other papers and magazines (1963–1968). His influence on British public life was enormous. He believed that criticism of Winston Churchill's government by the Mirror had caused that government's collapse after the war. He maintained a connection to both the MI6 and the Central Intelligence Agency during this period, and operated the left-of-centre propaganda magazine Encounter via IPC from 1964.

King was involved in and may have instigated a 1968 meeting with Louis Mountbatten, among others, in which he proposed that Harold Wilson's government be overthrown and replaced with a temporary administration headed by Mountbatten. He decided to override the editorial independence of the Mirror and wrote and instructed to be published a front-page article calling on Wilson to be removed by some sort of extra-parliamentary action. The board of IPC met and demanded his resignation for this breach of procedure and for damaging the interests of IPC as a public company. He refused and was dismissed by the board on 30 May, leaving command to his deputy, Hugh Cudlipp, who later expanded IPC's business in the United States.

=== Personal life and death ===
He married Agnes Margaret Cooke, daughter of Canon George Albert Cooke and Frances Helen Anderson, in 1923. They had four children: Michael, Francis, Priscilla and Colin. He and Agnes Margaret Cooke were divorced. He married his second wife Ruth Railton in 1962, founder of the National Youth Orchestra of Great Britain, daughter of Rev David Railton and Ruby Marion Wilson.

In 1974, King moved from London to Dublin with his second wife. He died at his Dublin home, The Pavilion, 23 Greenfield Park, Donnybrook, following a long illness. He was survived by Dame Ruth and two children from his first marriage, his sons Michael and Colin having predeceased him.

== Cultural depictions ==
He appears in Netflix's The Crown in episode five of season 3 ("Coup"), portrayed by actor Rupert Vansittart.

== Books ==
- The Future of the Press (MacGibbon & Kee, 1967)
- Strictly Personal (Weidenfeld & Nicolson, 1969)
- With Malice Toward None: A War Diary (Sidgwick & Jackson, 1970)
- Without Fear or Favour (Sidgwick & Jackson, 1971)
- The Cecil King Diary, 1965–1970 (Jonathan Cape, 1972)
- On Ireland (Jonathan Cape, 1973)
- The Cecil King Diary, 1970–1974 (Jonathan Cape, 1975)
- Commonplace Book (Denham House, 1981)
