= St John Harmsworth =

English businessman (1876 – 1933)

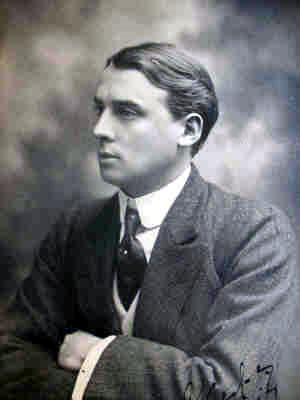
- Born: William Albert St John Harmsworth; 19 May 1876; St John's Wood, London, England
- Died: 4 May 1933 (aged 56); Vergèze, France
- Education: Christ Church, Oxford
- Known for: Transformed Perrier mineral water into a global brand
- Board member of: Amalgamated Press
- Parent(s): Alfred Harmsworth; Geraldine Maffett
- Relatives: Alfred Harmsworth, 1st Viscount Northcliffe; Harold Harmsworth, 1st Viscount Rothermere; Cecil Harmsworth, 1st Baron Harmsworth; Sir Leicester Harmsworth, 1st Baronet; Sir Hildebrand Harmsworth, 1st Baronet (all brothers)

William Albert St John Harmsworth (May 19, 1876 – May 4, 1933) was an English businessman who bought and established the fledgling Perrier brand of sparkling mineral water in France, designed its distinctive bulbous green bottle, and made it a huge success in the British Empire.

== Early life ==
Harmsworth was born in May 1876 in St John's Wood, London, the seventh son of Alfred Harmsworth (1837–1889), a barrister, and his wife, Geraldine Maffett. His elder brothers were Alfred Harmsworth, 1st Viscount Northcliffe, Harold Harmsworth, 1st Viscount Rothermere, Cecil Harmsworth, 1st Baron Harmsworth, Sir Leicester Harmsworth, 1st Baronet, and Sir Hildebrand Harmsworth, 1st Baronet.

He graduated from Christ Church, Oxford, with a BA and was a director of the Amalgamated Press (founded by his brother, Alfred). He was a member of the Sylvan Debating Club, which was founded by his father.

== Career ==
At the age of 27, when travelling in the south of France, Harmsworth met Dr Louis Perrier, a local doctor, who had bought a spring in 1898 in nearby Vergèze, and was operating a commercial spa and bottling the water for sale. Perrier was in dire need of investment, and showed Harmsworth the spring, which he then bought into, becoming the sole owner within two years, selling his share in the Daily Mail to raise the funds. He closed the spa and focused on bottling the water, renaming the spring Source Perrier.

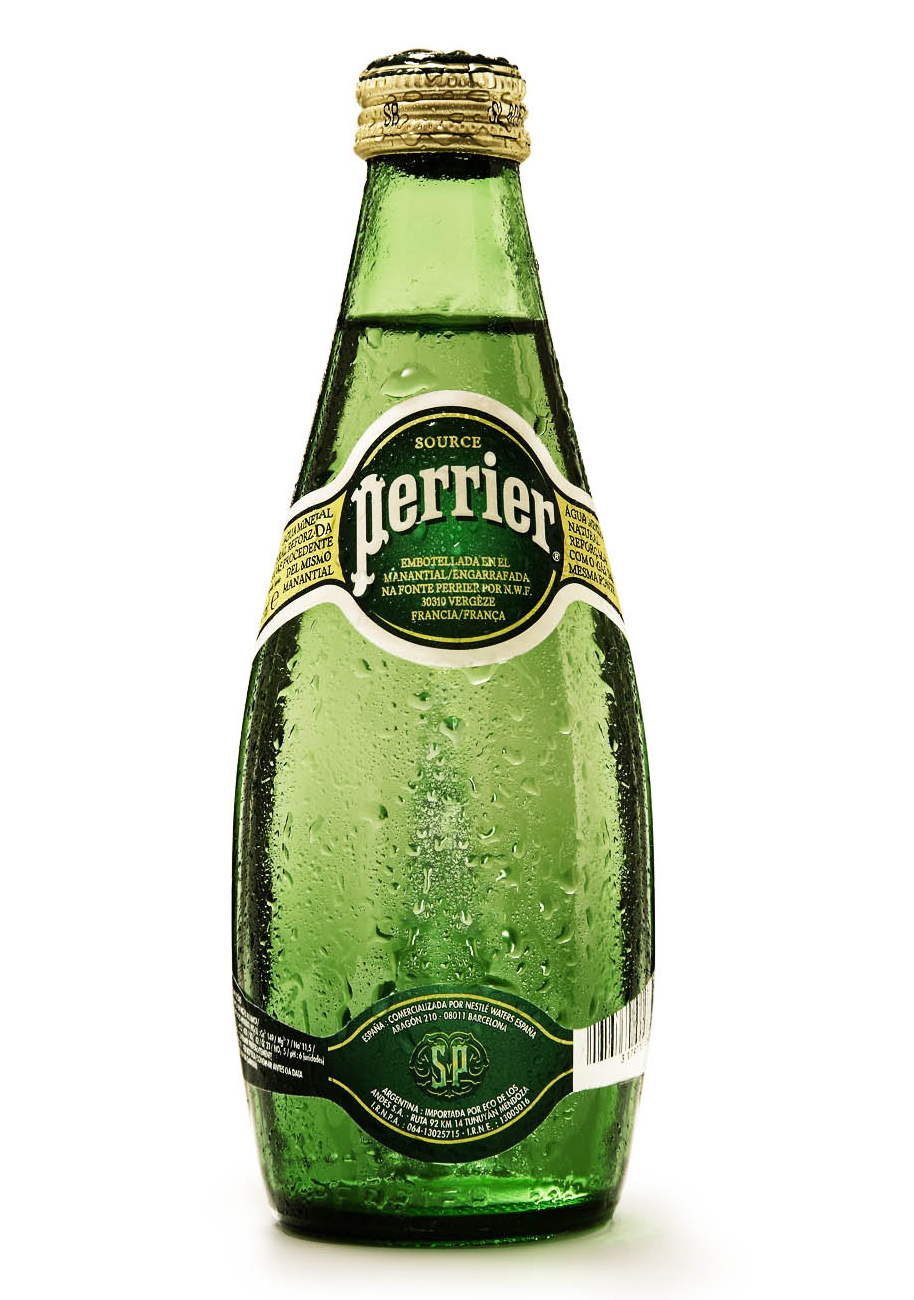
Perrier water

In 1906, he was injured in a motor accident on the Great North Road, near Hatfield in Hertfordshire, when his chauffeur missed the road in the darkness whilst travelling at high speed; Harmsworth was paralysed from the waist down for the rest of his life. He based the shape of the distinctive bulbous green Perrier bottle, which he designed, on the Indian clubs that he used for exercise following his accident.

The Perrier sparkling mineral water was a great success across the British Empire, and in 1905, Harmsworth received a Royal Warrant. At that time, the water was "better known in London, Delhi and Singapore than in Paris".

== Personal life ==
Harmsworth's house, Les Bouillens, which was next to the Perrier factory, is now a museum about the Perrier brand. He also had houses at 7, Hyde Park Terrace, London, and "Pilots Point", Totland Bay, on the Isle of Wight.
