= Alfred Harmsworth, 1st Viscount Northcliffe =

British newspaper and publishing magnate (1865–1922)

The Right Honourable The Viscount Northcliffe
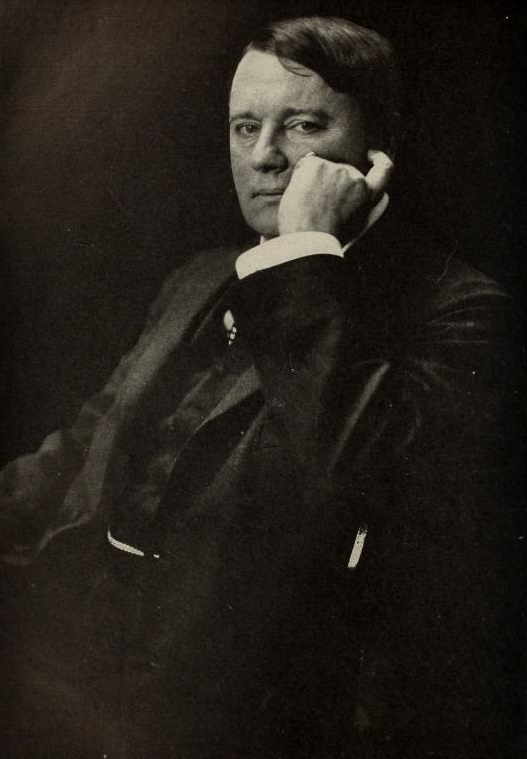
- Photograph by Gertrude Käsebier (1908)

Member of the House of Lords
- Lord Temporal
- In office 4 January 1906 – 14 August 1922
- Preceded by: Peerage created
- Succeeded by: Peerage extinct

Personal details
- Born: Alfred Charles William Harmsworth; 15 July 1865 Chapelizod, County Dublin, Ireland
- Died: 14 August 1922 (aged 57) Carlton House Gardens, London, England
- Spouse: Mary Elizabeth Milner (m. 1888)
- Children: 4 (illegitimate)
- Parent(s): Alfred Harmsworth; Geraldine Maffett
- Relatives: The 1st Baron Harmsworth (brother); The 1st Viscount Rothermere (brother); Sir Leicester Harmsworth (brother); Sir Hildebrand Harmsworth (brother); St John Harmsworth (brother)
- Education: Stamford School
- Occupation: Publisher

Alfred Charles William Harmsworth, 1st Viscount Northcliffe (15 July 1865 – 14 August 1922), was a British newspaper and publishing magnate. As owner of the Daily Mail and the Daily Mirror, he was an early developer of popular journalism, and he exercised vast influence over British popular opinion during the Edwardian era. Lord Beaverbrook said he was "the greatest figure who ever strode down Fleet Street." About the beginning of the 20th century there were increasing attempts to develop popular journalism intended for the working class and tending to emphasize sensational topics. Harmsworth was the main innovator.

Lord Northcliffe had a powerful role during the First World War, especially by criticizing the government regarding the Shell Crisis of 1915. He directed a mission to the new ally, the United States, during 1917, and was director of enemy propaganda during 1918.

His Amalgamated Press employed writers such as Arthur Mee and John Hammerton, and its subsidiary, the Educational Book Company, published The Harmsworth Self-Educator, The Children's Encyclopædia, Harmsworth Popular Science, and Harmsworth's Universal Encyclopaedia. Challenging the dominance in popularity of the "penny dreadfuls" among British children, from the 1890s Harmsworth half-penny periodicals, such as Illustrated Chips, would enjoy a virtual monopoly of comics in the UK until the emergence of DC Thomson comics in the 1930s.

== Biography ==
=== Early life and success ===
Born in Chapelizod, County Dublin, the son of Alfred and Geraldine Harmsworth, he was educated at Stamford School in Lincolnshire, England, from 1876 and at Henley House School in Kilburn, London, from 1878. A master at Henley House who was to prove important to his future was J. V. Milne, the father of A. A. Milne, who according to H. G. Wells was at school with him at the time and encouraged Harmsworth to start the school magazine. In 1880 he first visited the Sylvan Debating Club, founded by his father, and of which he later served as Treasurer.

Beginning as a freelance journalist, he initiated his first newspaper, Answers (original title: Answers to Correspondents), and was later assisted by his brother Harold, who was adept in business matters. Harmsworth had an intuitive sense for what the reading public wanted to buy, and began a series of cheap but successful periodicals, such as Comic Cuts (tagline: "Amusing without being Vulgar") and the journal Forget-Me-Not for women. From these periodicals, he developed the largest periodical publishing company in the world, Amalgamated Press. His half-penny periodicals published in the 1890s played a role in the decline of the Victorian penny dreadfuls.

Harmsworth was an early developer of popular journalism. He bought several failing newspapers and made them into an enormously profitable news group, primarily by appealing to the general public. He began with The Evening News during 1894, and then merged two Edinburgh papers to form the Edinburgh Daily Record. That same year he funded an expedition to Franz Joseph Land in the Arctic with the intention of making attempts to travel to the North Pole.

On 4 May 1896, he began publishing the Daily Mail in London, which was a success, having the world record for daily circulation until Harmsworth's death; taglines of the Daily Mail included "the busy man's daily journal" and "the penny newspaper for one halfpenny". Prime Minister Robert Cecil, Lord Salisbury, said it was "written by office boys for office boys". Harmsworth then transformed a Sunday newspaper, the Weekly Dispatch, into the Sunday Dispatch, then the greatest circulation Sunday newspaper in Britain. He also initiated the Harmsworth Magazine (later London Magazine 1898–1915), utilizing one of Britain's best editors, Beckles Willson, who had been editor of many successful publications, including The Graphic.

During 1899, Harmsworth was responsible for the unprecedented success of a charitable appeal for the dependents of soldiers fighting in the South African War by inviting Rudyard Kipling and Arthur Sullivan to write the song "The Absent-Minded Beggar".

Harmsworth also initiated The Daily Mirror during 1903, and rescued the financially desperate The Observer and The Times during 1905 and 1908, respectively. During 1908, he also acquired The Sunday Times. The Amalgamated Press subsidiary the Educational Book Company published the Harmsworth Self-Educator, The Children's Encyclopædia, and Harmsworth's Universal Encyclopaedia. He brought his younger brothers into his media empire, and they all flourished: Harold Harmsworth, 1st Viscount Rothermere, Cecil Harmsworth, 1st Baron Harmsworth, Sir Leicester Harmsworth, 1st Baronet, and Sir Hildebrand Harmsworth, 1st Baronet.

=== Ennobled ===
Harmsworth was created a Baronet, of Elmwood, in the parish of St Peters in the County of Kent in 1904. In 1906, Harmsworth was raised to the peerage as Baron Northcliffe, of the Isle of Thanet in the County of Kent. The peerage was requested by King Edward VII, and was alleged to have been purchased. It remains a matter of speculation. He is reported to have joked that when he wanted a peerage he would buy one, "like an honest man." In 1918, Harmsworth was created Viscount Northcliffe, of St Peter's in the County of Kent, for his service as the director of the British war mission in the United States.

== Marriage ==
Alfred Harmsworth married Mary Elizabeth Milner on 11 April 1888. She was appointed Dame Grand Cross of the Order of the British Empire (GBE) and Dame of Grace, Order of St John (D.St.J) during 1918. They did not have any children together.

=== Children ===
Lord Northcliffe had four acknowledged children by two different women. The first, Alfred Benjamin Smith, was born when Harmsworth was seventeen years old; the mother was a sixteen-year-old maidservant in his parents' home. Smith died in 1930, allegedly in a mental hospital. By 1900, Harmsworth had acquired a new mistress, an Irishwoman named Kathleen Wrohan, about whom little is known but her name; they had two further sons and a daughter, and she died in 1923.

== Political influence ==
By 1914 Northcliffe controlled 40% of the morning newspaper circulation, 45% of the evening and 15% of the Sunday circulation in Britain.

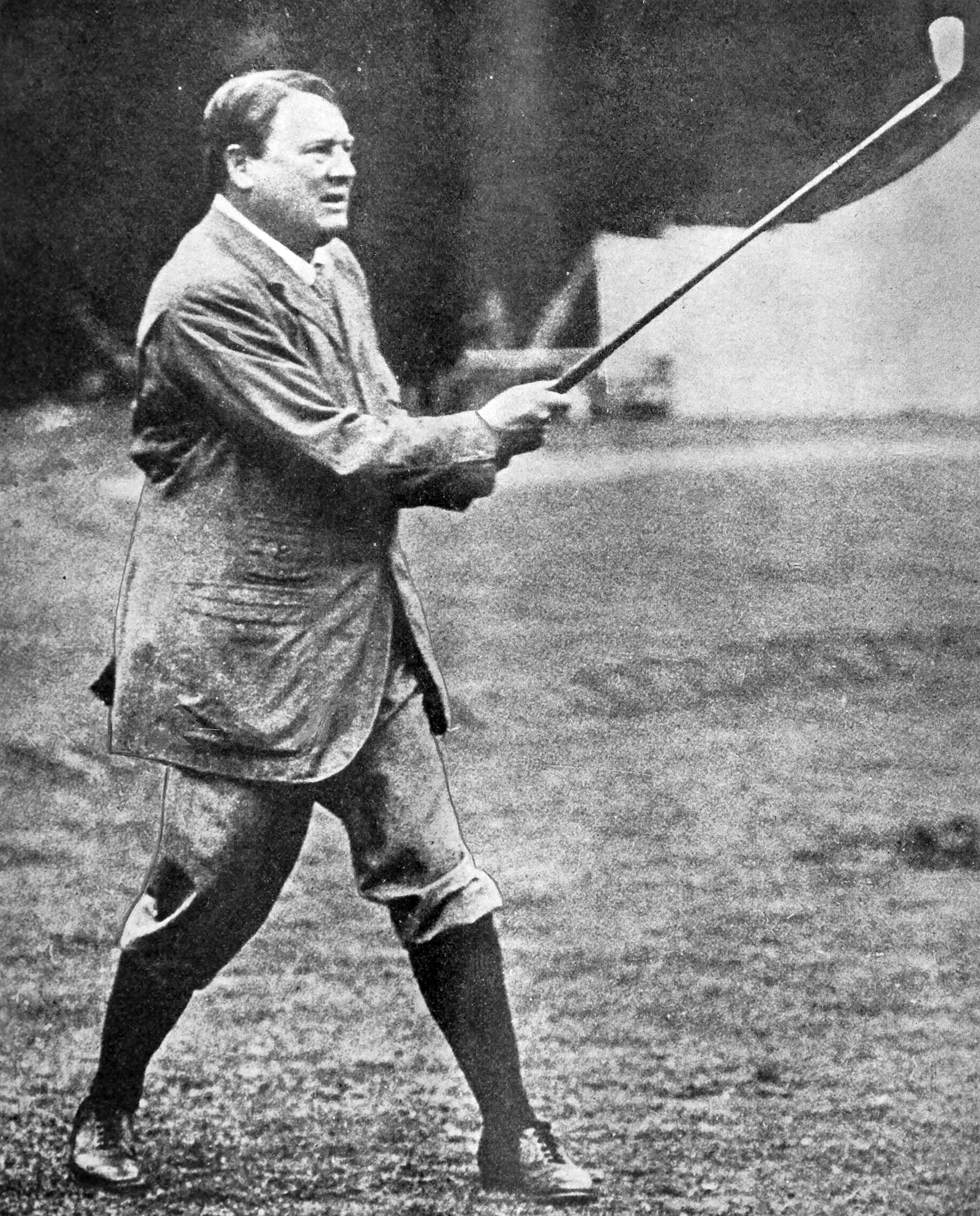
June 1917

Northcliffe's ownership of The Times, the Daily Mail and other newspapers meant that his editorials influenced both "the classes and the masses". That meant that in an era before radio, television or internet, Northcliffe dominated the British press "as it never has been before or since by one man".

Northcliffe's editorship of the Daily Mail in the years just before the First World War in which the newspaper displayed "a virulent anti-German sentiment" caused The Star to declare, "Next to the Kaiser, Lord Northcliffe has done more than any living man to bring about the war". His newspapers, especially The Times, reported the Shell Crisis of 1915 with such zeal that it helped to end the Liberal government of Prime Minister H. H. Asquith, which forced Asquith to form a coalition government (the other causal event was the resignation of Admiral Fisher as First Sea Lord). Northcliffe's newspapers propagandized for creating a Minister of Munitions, which was held first by David Lloyd George, and helped to bring about Lloyd George's appointment as prime minister in 1916. Lloyd George offered Northcliffe a job in his cabinet, but Northcliffe refused and was instead appointed director for propaganda.

Northcliffe had used his newspapers to criticise the British government's lack of readiness for what he perceived to be the German threat. On 25 February 1917, a German warship shelled Northcliffe's country house Elmwood located near the Kent coast in an attempt to assassinate him. His former residence still bears a shell hole out of respect for his gardener's wife, who was killed in the attack. On 6 April 1919, Lloyd George made an excoriating attack on Harmsworth, terming his arrogance "diseased vanity". By then, Harmsworth's influence was decreasing.

Northcliffe's enemies accused him of power without responsibility, but his papers were a factor in settling the Anglo-Irish Treaty in 1921, and his mission to the United States, from June through to October 1917, has been judged successful by historians.

Northcliffe's personality shaped his career. He was monolingual and not well-educated and knew little history or science. He had a lust for power and for money, while leaving the accounting paperwork to his brother Harold. He imagined himself Napoleon reborn and resembled the emperor physically and in terms of his enormous energy and ambition. Above all, he had a boyish enthusiasm for everything. Norman Fyfe, an intimate friend, described him:

Boyish in his power of concentration upon the matter of the moment, boyish in his readiness to turn swiftly to a different matter and concentrate on that.... Boyish the limited range of his intellect, which seldom concerns itself with anything but the immediate, the obvious, the popular. Boyish his irresponsibility, his disinclination to take himself or his publications seriously; his conviction that whatever benefits them is justifiable, and that it is not his business to consider the effect of their contents on the public mind.

== Sport ==
In 1903 Harmsworth initiated the Harmsworth Cup, the first international award for motorboat racing.

=== Motoring ===
Harmsworth was a friend of Claude Johnson, chief executive of Rolls-Royce Limited, and during the years preceding the First World war became an enthusiast of the Rolls-Royce Silver Ghost car.

== Death ==
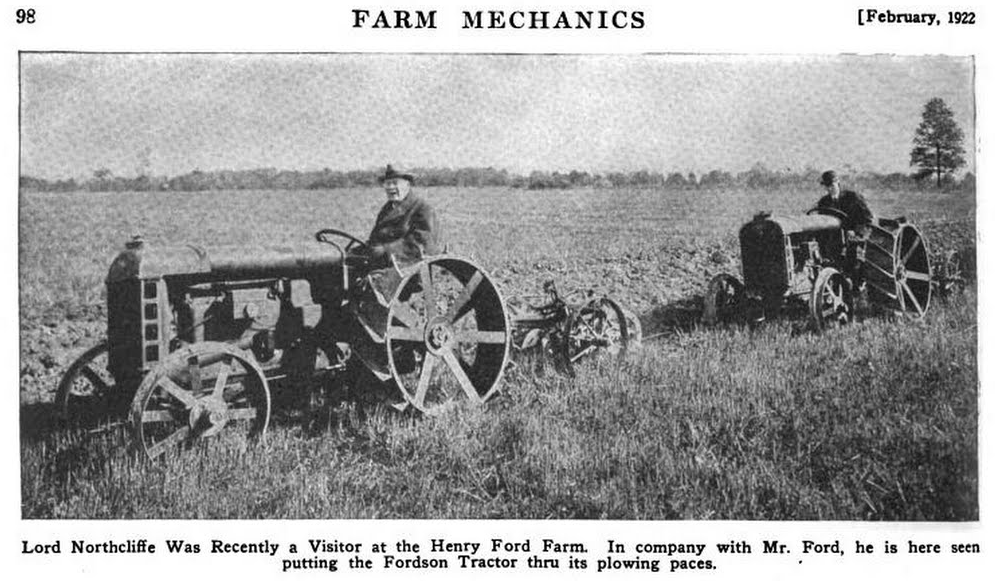
Lord Northcliffe circa 1921 driving a Fordson tractor at Henry Ford's farm near Dearborn, Michigan, U.S. Northcliffe was on a world tour at the time, trying to recover his health, but he died in 1922. He had been closely involved in the purchase of Fordson tractors by the British government during the First World War.

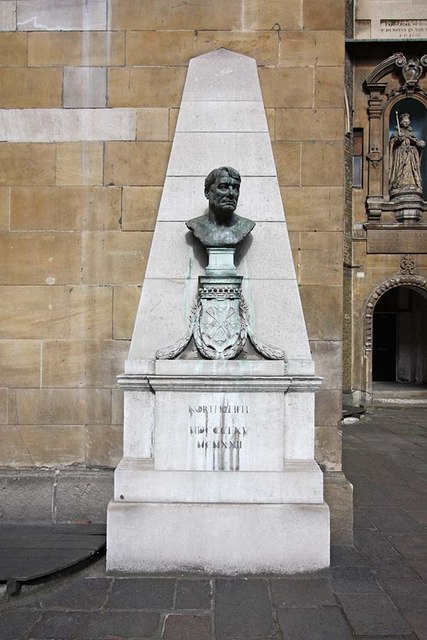
Monument to Northcliffe at St Dunstan-in-the-West

Lord Northcliffe's health declined during 1921 due mainly to a streptococcal infection. His mental health collapsed; he acted like a madman but historians say it was a physical malady. He went on a world tour to revive himself, but it failed to do so. He died of endocarditis in his London house, No. 1 Carlton House Gardens, on 14 August 1922. He left three months' pay to each of his six thousand employees. The viscountcy, barony, and baronetcy of Northcliffe became extinct.

A monument to Northcliffe at St Dunstan-in-the-West, Fleet Street, London, was unveiled in 1930. The obelisk was designed by Edwin Lutyens and the bronze bust is by Kathleen Scott. His body was buried at East Finchley Cemetery in North London.

== Legacy ==
Historian Ian Christopher Fletcher states:

Northcliffe's drive for success and respectability found its main outlet in the commercial world of journalism, not the political world the parties and parliaments. Perhaps his greatest accomplishment, underlying the relentless acquisition of newspapers and perfection of their "copy", was the simple incorporation of millions of readers into his press empire.

A. J. P. Taylor, however, says, "Northcliffe could destroy when he used the news properly. He could not step into the vacant place. He aspired to power instead of influence, and as a result forfeited both."

P. P. Catterall and Colin Seymour-Ure conclude that:

More than anyone [he] ... shaped the modern press. Developments he introduced or harnessed remain central: broad contents, exploitation of advertising revenue to subsidize prices, aggressive marketing, subordinate regional markets, independence from party control.

According to Piers Brendon:

Northcliffe's methods made the Mail the most successful newspaper hitherto seen in the history of journalism. But by confusing gewgaws with pearls, by selecting the paltry at the expense of the significant, by confirming atavistic prejudices, by oversimplifying the complex, by dramatizing the humdrum, by presenting stories as entertainment and by blurring the difference between news and views, Northcliffe titillated, if he did not debouch, the public mind; he polluted, if he did not poison, the wells of knowledge.

The A. Harmsworth Glacier in North Greenland was named by Robert Peary in his honour. (Northcliffe had provided a ship for the expedition.)

The roads Harmsworth Way and Northcliffe Drive in Totteridge, north London, were named after Northcliffe.

Northcliffe lived for a time at 31 Pandora Road, West Hampstead; this site is now marked with an English Heritage blue plaque.

=== Cultural depictions ===
Northcliffe was the subject of a number of fictionalized portrayals. One of the earliest was the character of Mr. Whelpdale in George Gissing's 1891 novel New Grub Street. Whelpdale publishes a magazine called Chit-Chat (similar to Northcliffe's Answers), which is aimed at "the quarter-educated; that is to say the great new generation that is being turned out by the Board Schools, the young men and women who can just read, but are incapable of sustained attention".

Arnold Bennett's 1909 West End play What the Public Wants centers on Sir Charles Worgan, a profit-hungry media baron based on Northcliffe. J. B. Fagan's 1910 play The Earth features a satirical version of Northcliffe, Sir Felix Janion, who uses sexual blackmail to prevent the passing of a bill which would provide a minimum wage for his employees.

=== Promotion of Group Settlement Scheme ===
Throughout his newspaper career Northcliffe promoted the ideas which resulted in the Group Settlement Scheme. The scheme promised land in Western Australia to British settlers prepared to emigrate and develop the land. A town founded specifically to assist the new settlements was named Northcliffe, in recognition of Lord Northcliffe's promotion of the scheme.

== Works ==
- Motors and motor-driving (1906)
- The World's Greatest Books, 20 vols. (edited by him)
- At the War (1917)
- Lord Northcliffe's war book, with chapters on America at war (1917)

== See also ==
- Daily Mail aviation prizes
- Northcliffe Glacier
- Northcliffe Media

== Sources ==
- Boyce, D. George (2004). Harmsworth, Alfred Charles William, Viscount Northcliffe (1865–1922). Oxford Dictionary of National Biography, Oxford University Press.
- Brendon, Piers (2003). Eminent Edwardians: Four Figures Who Defined Their Age - Northcliffe, Balfour, Pankhurst, Baden-Powell. Pimlico. pp. 1–64. ISBN 978-1-84413-081-8.
- Fyfe, Hamilton. Lord Northcliffe: An Intimate Biography (London: G. Allen & Unwin, 1930)
- Roberts, Andrew (2022). The Chief: The Life of Lord Northcliffe Britain's Greatest Press Baron. New York: Simon and Schuster. ISBN 9781398508705.
- Taylor, S. J. (1996). The Great Outsiders: Northcliffe, Rothermere and the Daily Mail. London: Weidenfeld & Nicolson. ISBN 978-0297816539.
- Thompson, J. Lee. "Fleet Street Colossus: The Rise and Fall of Northcliffe, 1896-1922." Parliamentary History 25.1 (2006): 115–138. online

Peerage of the United Kingdom
New creation	Viscount Northcliffe; 1918–1922	Extinct
New creation	Baron Northcliffe; 1906–1922; Member of the House of Lords (1906–1922)	Extinct
Baronetage of the United Kingdom
New creation	Baronet of Elmwood; 1904–1922	Extinct
Preceded by Goulding baronets	Harmsworth baronets of Elmwood; 23 August 1904	Succeeded by Kimber baronets
