= Harold Harmsworth, 1st Viscount Rothermere =

British newspaper proprietor (1868–1940)

The Right Honourable The Viscount Rothermere PC
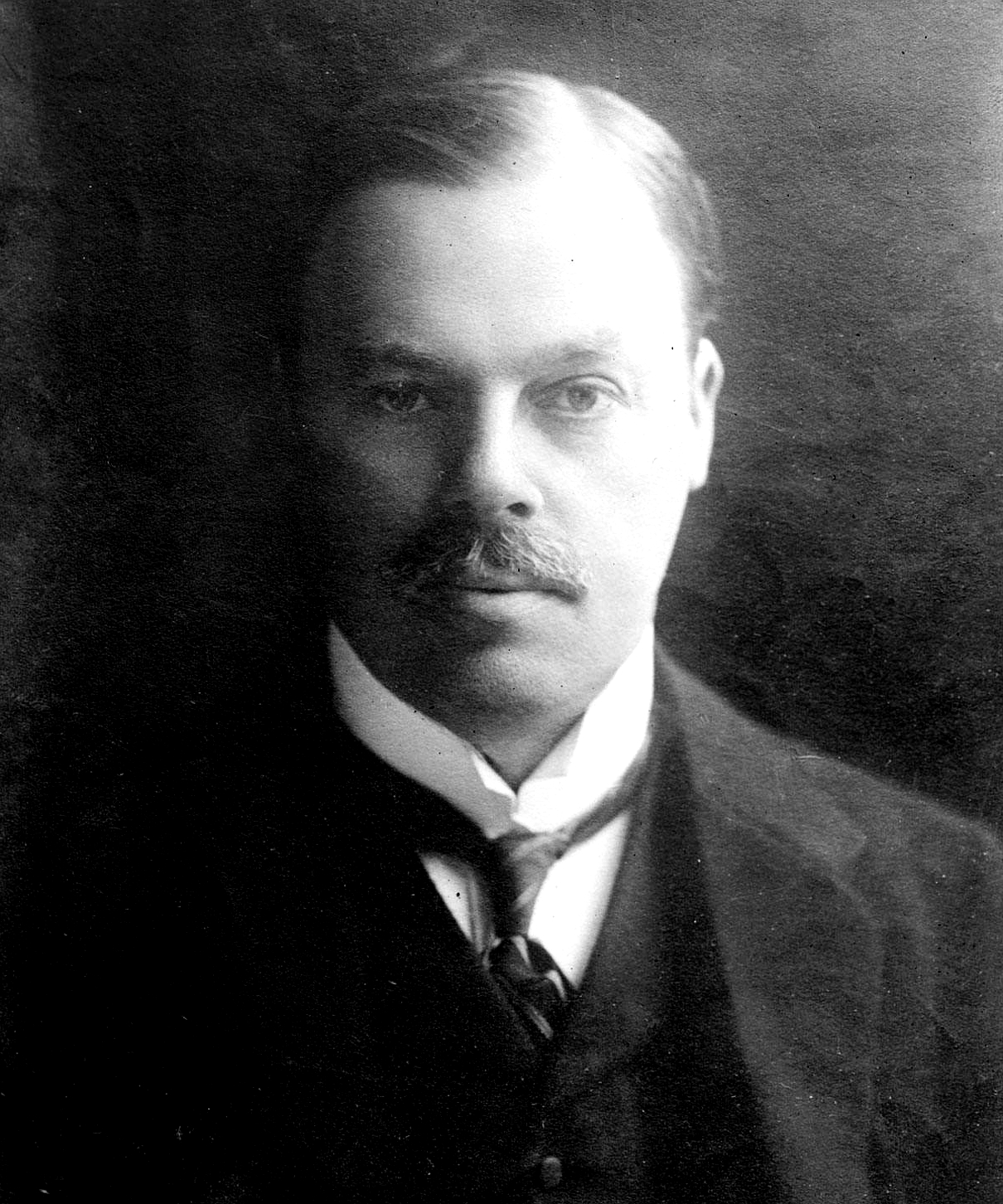
- Lord Rothermere

President of the Air Council
- In office 26 November 1917 – 26 April 1918
- Preceded by: The Viscount Cowdray
- Succeeded by: The Lord Weir

Member of the House of Lords
- Lord Temporal
- In office 27 January 1914 – 26 November 1940
- Preceded by: Peerage created
- Succeeded by: The 2nd Viscount Rothermere

Personal details
- Born: Harold Sidney Harmsworth; 26 April 1868 London, England
- Died: 26 November 1940 (aged 72) Bermuda
- Spouse: Mary Lilian Share
- Children: Harold Alfred Vyvyan St. George Harmsworth (1894–1918); Vere Sidney Tudor Harmsworth (1895–1916); Esmond Cecil Harmsworth (1898–1978)
- Parents: Alfred Harmsworth; Geraldine Maffett
- Relatives: Cecil Harmsworth (brother); Alfred Harmsworth (brother); Leicester Harmsworth (brother); Hildebrand Harmsworth (brother); St John Harmsworth (brother)
- Occupation: Publisher

Harold Sidney Harmsworth, 1st Viscount Rothermere (26 April 1868 – 26 November 1940), was a leading British newspaper proprietor who owned Associated Newspapers Ltd. He is best known, like his brother Alfred Harmsworth, later Viscount Northcliffe, for the development of the Daily Mail and the Daily Mirror. Rothermere was a pioneer of popular tabloid journalism, and his descendants continue to control the Daily Mail and General Trust.

Two of Rothermere's three sons were killed in action during the First World War and in the 1930s, he advocated peaceful relations between Germany and the United Kingdom, and used his media influence to that end. He became known for his open support for fascism and praise for Nazi Germany and the British Union of Fascists, which contributed to the popularity of those views in the 1930s. After seeing his hopes dashed by the outbreak of the Second World War, he died in Bermuda.

== Background ==
Harmsworth was the second son of Alfred and Geraldine Harmsworth (née Maffett). His thirteen siblings included Alfred Harmsworth, 1st Viscount Northcliffe, Cecil Harmsworth, 1st Baron Harmsworth, Sir Leicester Harmsworth, 1st Baronet, and Sir Hildebrand Harmsworth, 1st Baronet. Rothermere was an active member of the Sylvan Debating Club, founded by his father. He first attended as a visitor in 1882 and later served as treasurer.

He was educated at St Marylebone Grammar School, which he left to become a clerk for the Board of Trade. In 1888 he joined his elder brother Alfred's newspaper company, and in 1894 he and his brother purchased the Evening News for £25,000.

== Entry into Fleet Street ==
In 1896 Harmsworth and his brother Alfred together founded the Daily Mail. In 1903 they launched the Daily Mirror. In 1910 Harmsworth bought the Glasgow Record and Mail, and in 1915 the Sunday Pictorial. By 1921 he was owner of the Daily Mirror, Sunday Pictorial, Glasgow Daily Record, Evening News, and Sunday Mail, and shared ownership of the company Associated Newspapers with his brother Alfred, who had been made Viscount Northcliffe in 1918. His greatest success came with the Daily Mirror, which had a circulation of three million by 1922.

Although one of the chief rivals of the Harmsworth newspapers was the Daily Express owned by Max Aitken (the future Lord Beaverbrook), in May 1913 Harmsworth went with Aitken on a lengthy business trip to western Canada. The trip marked the start of an odd alliance between Aitken and the Harmsworth family that would persist regardless of the rivalry between the Daily Mail and the Daily Express. When Aitken was raised to the peerage in 1917 as Baron Beaverbrook, Harmsworth, by then Baron Rothermere, served as one of his sponsors when he first entered the House of Lords. Aitken regarded him as the more relatable of the two brothers.

== Grand Falls, Newfoundland ==
In 1904, on behalf of his elder brother Alfred, Harmsworth travelled to Newfoundland with Mayson Beeton, son of Isabella Beeton, the author of Mrs Beeton's Book of Household Management, to search for a supply of timber and a site to build a pulp and paper mill. They found a suitable site at Grand Falls, on the Exploits River, which had been named by John Cartwright in 1768. They bought the land and developed a company town there which became Grand Falls-Windsor. To harvest the timber, Harmsworth founded the Anglo-Newfoundland Corporation, which became one of the largest corporations in Newfoundland.

== Aviation ==
In 1903, the first flight took place, and the new technology of aviation was eagerly followed. Harmsworth was amongst those fascinated with aviation, and in 1906 came up with the idea of having the Harmsworth newspapers offer a prize of £1,000 to the first person to fly across the English Channel. He followed this challenge with another offering £10,000 for the first person to fly from London to Manchester.

== Honours ==
Harmsworth was created a baronet, of Horsey in the County of Norfolk, in 1910. In 1914 he was raised to the peerage as Baron Rothermere, of Hemsted in the County of Kent; in 1919 he was made Viscount Rothermere.

== Public life ==
The politician Rothermere was closest to before the First World War was Winston Churchill, the First Lord of the Admiralty. In 1915, Rothermere wrote to Churchill asking him to promote one of his former reporters, Jack Kruse, to the rank of captain in the Royal Naval Division, a request that was granted. The ill-fated Dardanelles campaign, which Churchill had promoted, led to a break in their friendship. By the fall of 1915, the Battle of Gallipoli degenerated into a stalemate with the Allies unable to advance up the heights of Gallipoli while the Ottomans were unable to push the Allies back into the sea. Rothermere's brother Lord Northcliffe used his newspapers to document the failures of the Allies in the Dardanelles campaign, and demanded that the Allies leave Gallipoli. The defeat in the Dardanelles seriously damaged Churchill's reputation, and as Harmsworth supported his brother, his friendship with Churchill soured. However, Rothermere remained in contact with Churchill and employed him from time to time as a special writer on aviation for the Daily Mail.

For a time during the war, Rothermere served as President of the Air Council in the government of David Lloyd George. Rothermere proved to an inept politician whose background as a businessman with a dictatorial control of a press empire made him ill-suited to the cabinet, which required the ability to reach a consensus with other cabinet ministers. He was incapable of compromise, instead attempting to ram his proposals through and incessantly plotting against cabinet colleagues who disagreed with him. His main interest was in combining the Royal Flying Corps of the British Army with the Royal Naval Air Service to create a third service to be called the Royal Air Force. He was ejected from the cabinet after only five months. In 1921, he founded the Anti-Waste League to combat what he saw as excessive government spending.

== Press baron ==
When his elder brother died in 1922 without an heir, Harmsworth acquired his controlling interest in Associated Newspapers for £1.6 million, and the next year bought the Hulton newspaper chain, which gave him control of three national morning newspapers, three national Sunday newspapers, two London evening papers, four provincial daily newspapers, and three provincial Sunday newspapers. To pay the death duties on Northcliffe's estate, Rothermere sold the Associated Press and The Times. Rothermere was the third richest man in Britain with a fortune in 1922 worth £780 million. One contemporary who knew him called him "a proud, gruff captain of industry" with a tendency to be rude.

Rothermere had a fundamentally elitist conception of politics, believing that the natural leaders of Britain were upper class men like himself. He strongly disapproved of the decision to grant women over the age of 30 the right to vote, and with the end of the franchise requirements that had disenfranchised lower-class men; a Daily Mail leader declared: "[Q]uite a few people now possess the vote who ought never to have been given it". He started to lose faith in democracy, fearing that with the extended franchise, the rise of the Labour Party that had begun with the 1918 election might culminate in the formation of a hitherto unthinkable Labour government. As Collin Brooks, the journalist whom Rothermere had appointed as his official biographer, wrote: "His prevailing mood was politically one of the deepest pessimism and personally of almost uproarious social mirth. He was convinced that Britain had entered a phase of decline, had lost her old militant virtues, and in her softness, was lusting after strange idols of pacifism, nationalisation, and everything which would sap self-reliance... His family had at one time all been nominal Liberals, but he among them was a temperamental Tory of the Johnsonian school".

Two of Rothermere's sons died as a result of their service in the First World War. Vere Harmsworth served in the Royal Naval Division and was killed in action on 16 November 1916 during the Second Battle of Cambrai. Vyvyan Harmsworth died in 1918 of wounds he had taken in 1916. To add to his stress, Rothermere's marriage broke down as his wife, Lillian, had an affair with his younger brother, St. John. Britain's strict divorce laws, which were not relaxed until 1967, would have required him to prove his wife's adultery in court to secure a dissolution of the marriage, and he refused to admit publicly to having been cuckolded. He became lonely and unhappy. He was a womaniser whose relationships with his mistresses, until 1927, were very brief, as he rapidly lost interest once he had taken his new conquest to bed. He had a tendency to ennui, walking the streets of London every morning looking for something new, and when he was bored with London, taking extensive foreign trips. Addison argued that Rothermere was a psychologically troubled man with his maniacal mood swings; an inability to have lasting relationships; and a tendency towards hysteria.

Rothermere's political pessimism led him to fear imminent economic as well as political collapse. In November 1921, he wrote to Beaverbrook: "My own opinion is that we are on the threshold of the world slump. In its momentous consequences it is I am sure going to dwarf even the Great War. In the economic collapse of Russia, Austria, Hungary, the Balkan states, Turkey, Europe, and Asia-and the approaching collapse of Germany we see steadily being unfolded before our eyes a drama fraught with more perilous consequences for the human race than anything recorded in history". He had frequent night-time anxiety attacks, fearing that his wealth (he was one of the richest men in Britain) would diminish overnight, and he would telephone his corporate officer, Sir George Sutton, to demand information about his precise net worth. Any fall in the stock-market prices in the city or reports of economic trouble anywhere in the world caused him to demand immediate reassurances that steps were being taken to save his fortune. Sutton would assure him that he was taking such steps and that his fortune was secure, and then go back to sleep.

The Rothermere newspapers promoted a narrative of 'national degeneration'. A typical story in the Evening Standard, headlined in capital letters "WHITE GIRLS 'HYPNOTISED' BY YELLOW MEN", recounted what it called the "alarming facts" of London's Chinatown, warning in lurid detail of "the degradation of young white girls" at the hands of Chinese men: "Englishwomen are selling themselves to Chinamen; they are seeking out Asiatics in the streets where before the war no white women walked. The evil is baffling to the police and social workers. Women who have been 'rescued' and given a fresh start have relapsed and returned to their foreign masters, and have sunk even lower than before. The unmarried mother with a half-caste child is only one of the several problems arising. And obviously this cheapening of the white women among men who go down to the sea in ships must have reactions in the East and in every part of the world where colored and white races dwell side by side". The British historian Raphael Samuel noted that this story was typical of the "ever racist" Rothermere newspapers, which often painted a picture of a demonic Other posing an existential threat to a noble, but failing Britain.

In October 1922, the Daily Mail approved of the Fascist "March on Rome", arguing that democracy had failed in Italy, thus requiring Benito Mussolini to set up his Fascist dictatorship to save the social order. In May 1923, Rothermere published a leader in The Daily Mail entitled "What Europe Owes Mussolini", where he wrote about his "profound admiration" for Mussolini: "[I]n saving Italy he stopped the inroads of Bolshevism which would have left Europe in ruins...in my judgment he saved the entire Western world. It was because Mussolini overthrew Bolshevism in Italy that it collapsed in Hungary and ceased to gain adherents in Bavaria and Prussia". In the summer of 1923, the Daily Mail supported the Italian occupation of Corfu and condemned the British government for at least rhetorically opposing the Italian aggression against Greece. On 25 October 1924 the Daily Mail published the Zinoviev letter on its front page, and the newspaper campaigned vigorously against the Labour government of Ramsay MacDonald as being weak against Communism. The Zinoviev letter had been written not in Moscow, but rather in Berlin by Vladimir Gregorivitch Orlov, a Russian émigré who specialised in forgeries designed to provoke distrust and fear of the Soviet Union. The letter had been leaked to the Daily Mail by MI6, and vouched for by the Foreign Office; it remains unclear whether MI6 was aware that the Zinoviev letter was a forgery or not. Rothermere seems to have believed in its authenticity; for him, it confirmed all of his fears about the Labour Party. After the 1924 election, Rothermere boasted in a letter to Beaverbrook that the Zinoviev letter had cost Labour about 100 seats and been decisive in giving the Conservatives a majority.

Both Rothermere and Beaverbrook, the other British press baron, used their newspapers as platforms for promoting their right-wing views, and required their journalists to write about the news in a manner that promoted those views. Of the two, Beaverbrook permitted more dissent in order to retain the best reporters, while Rothermere was more dictatorial and readily sacked writers who did not use their words to reflect his views. Brooks wrote that the Rothermere press was "conducted like a Byzantium court and not an enterprise nominally for the honest dissemination of news and views" and that under such dictatorial rule "the whole community degenerates into a funk-ridden community of time-servers". In 1923 Rothermere and the Daily Mail forged an alliance with Beaverbrook against the Conservative Party leader Stanley Baldwin. Rothermere was outraged by Baldwin's centre-right style of Conservatism and his decision to respond to almost universal suffrage by expanding the appeal of the Conservative Party. While Rothermere regarded giving women the right to vote as a disaster, Baldwin set out to appeal to female voters, a tactic that was politically successful, but led Rothermere to accuse Baldwin of "feminising" the Conservative Party in toning down its aggressively masculine style. Likewise, Rothermere disapproved of Baldwin's championing "one-nation" conservatism in order to appeal to the working class. Rothermere used the Daily Mail to take a hawkish line with regard to the May Thirtieth Movement that began in China in 1925, presenting it in the context of Anglo-Soviet rivalry. The Daily Mail made such statements as: "[T]he British empire is the prime object of Bolshevist hatred" and "[T]he real evil-doer in China is the Soviet government...These dismal, long-haired criminals who are holding Russia down by terrorism and murder make the mistake of their lives if they imagine the British empire is going to be frightened of their threats and grimaces". Rothermere also used the crisis in China as a way to criticise Baldwin, declaring in a leader: "The trouble in China is that there really is no government, and consequently nothing to protect that unhappy country against the Bolsheviks... Are we much better off in this country?"

Rothermere in a leader conceded that Fascist methods were "not suited to a country like our own", but qualified his remark with the statement, "if our northern cities became Bolshevik we would need them". In a Daily Mail article in October 1927 that celebrated five years of Fascism in Italy, it was argued that there were parallels between modern Britain and Italy in the last years of the Liberal era as it was argued Italy went through a series of weak liberal and conservative governments that made concessions to the Italian Socialist Party such as granting universal male suffrage in 1912 whose "only result was to hasten the arrival of disorder". In the same article, Baldwin was compared to the Italian prime ministers of the Liberal era as the article argued that the general strike of 1926 should never have been allowed to occur and the Baldwin government was condemned "for the feebleness which it tries to placate opposition by being more Socialist than the Socialists". The clear implication of the article was that concessions to socialists whatever in Italy or the United Kingdom only caused chaos, and Britain needed a leader like Mussolini who would presumably ban the Labour Party, just as Mussolini had banned the Italian Socialist Party. In 1928, the Daily Mail in a leader written by Rothermere praised Mussolini as "the great figure of the age. Mussolini will probably dominate the history of the twentieth century as Napoleon dominated the early nineteen century".

In 1926 Harmsworth sold his magazine concern, Amalgamated Press, and moved into the field of provincial newspaper publishing. In 1928 he founded Northcliffe Newspapers Ltd and announced that he intended to launch a chain of evening newspapers in the main provincial cities. There then ensued the so-called "newspaper war" of 1928–29, which culminated in Harmsworth establishing new evening papers in Bristol and Derby and gaining a controlling interest in Cardiff's newspapers. By the end of 1929, his empire had 14 daily and Sunday newspapers, with a substantial holding in another three.

In 1930, Rothermere purchased the freehold of the old site of the Bethlem Hospital in Southwark. He donated it to the London County Council to be made into a public open space, to be known as the Geraldine Mary Harmsworth Park in memory of his mother, for the benefit of the "splendid struggling mothers of Southwark".

== Relationship with Stephanie von Hohenlohe and support for Hungary ==
In the spring of 1927, while playing roulette at a casino in Monte Carlo, Rothermere met the Princess Stephanie von Hohenlohe, who soon became his mistress. The meeting was no accident; Hohenlohe had gone to Monte Carlo with the aim of seducing Rothermere, and had done extensive advance research on his love life. She bribed a former mistress of Rothermere's, Annabel Kruse, to ensure that she had a seat at the same roulette table with him. At the time he met her, Rothermere was barely aware that Hungary even existed and was unable to find it on a map, requiring Hohenlohe to show him where Hungary was. When Hohenlohe showed him Hungary's location, he revealingly remarked: "You know, my dear, until today I had no idea that Budapest and Bucharest are two different cities". Under the influence of his mistress, Rothermere took up the cause of Hungarian revanchism against the Treaty of Trianon as his own.

The Hungarian leaders were determined to undo the Treaty of Trianon, but the weakness of the Hungarian military made war impossible as an option. In the 1920s, the Royal Hungarian Army consisted of 9 brigades with no tanks, no heavy artillery and no aircraft whose potential opponents were a total of 60 divisions from Romania, Yugoslavia and Czechoslovakia. Moreover, Romania, Yugoslavia and Czechoslovakia all had alliances with France. As such, the Hungarians had turned to other means to advance their desire to undo the Treaty of Trianon such as seeking the support of more powerful states. Hohenlohe, a beautiful woman known for her charm and greed, had been hired by Hungarian intelligence with orders to win over influencers of British public opinion, which led to the assignment to seduce Rothermere. Rothermere strongly supported revision of the Treaty of Trianon in Hungary's favour. On 21 June 1927, he published an editorial in the Daily Mail, "Hungary's Place in the Sun", in which he supported a detailed plan to restore to Hungary large pieces of territory that it had lost at the end of the First World War. That bold pro-Hungarian stance was greeted with ecstatic gratitude in Hungary.

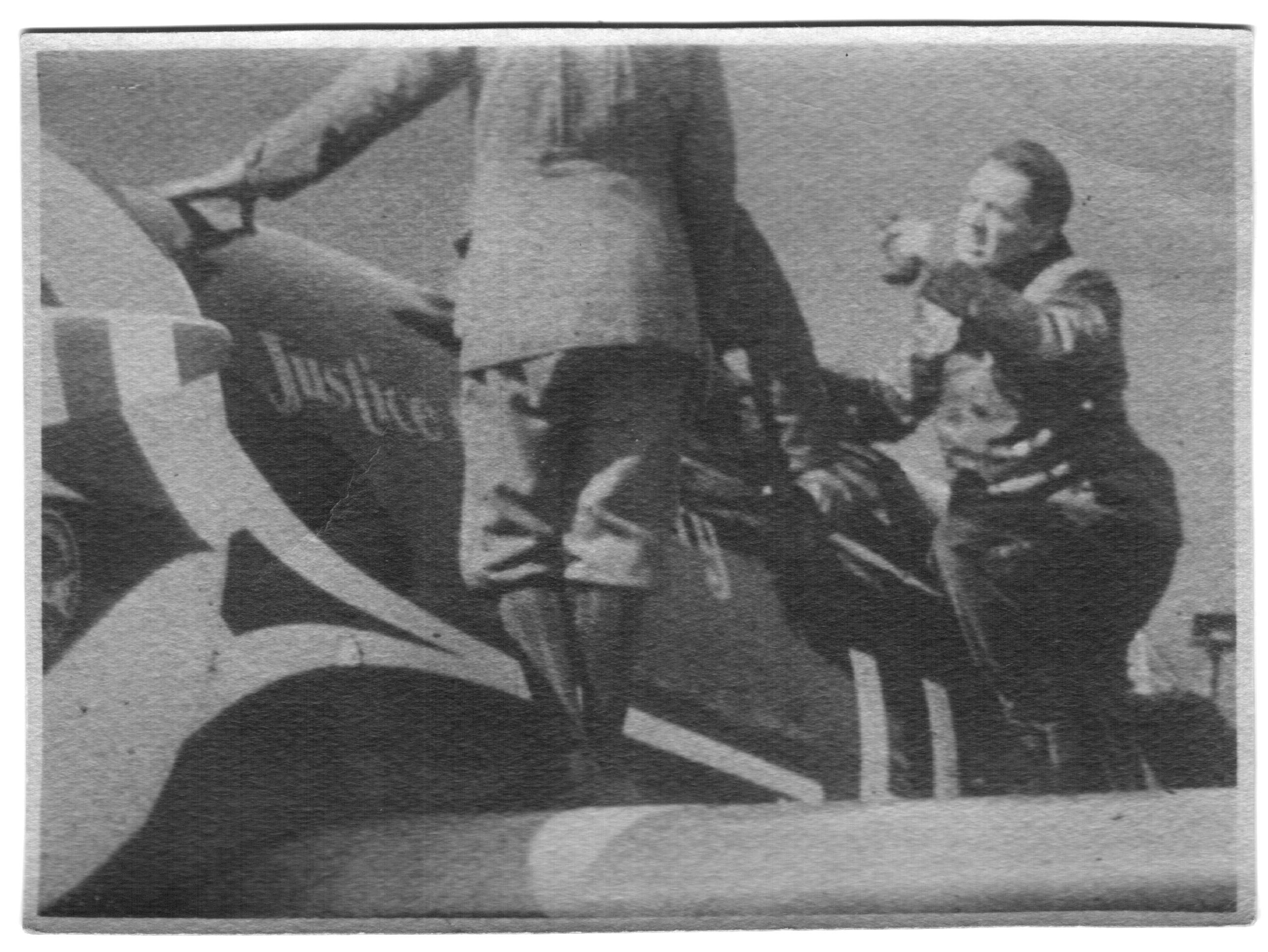
Transatlantic flight of Endresz György with Justice for Hungary – 15 July 1931

In "Hungary's Place in the Sun", Rothermere wrote with approval that Hungary was dominated both politically and economically by its "chivalrous and warlike aristocracy", whom he noted in past centuries had battled the Ottoman Empire, leading him to conclude that all of Europe owned a profound debt to the Hungarian aristocracy which had been "Europe's bastion against which the forces of Mahomet [the Prophet Mohammed] vainly hurled themselves against". Rothermere argued that it was unjust that the "noble" Hungarians should be under the rule of "cruder and more barbaric races", by which he meant the peoples of Romania, Czechoslovakia and Yugoslavia. Rothermere also took up the cause of the Sudeten Germans in his leader, writing that the Sudetenland should go to Germany. Rothermere used the same racial argument that he used in favour of the Magyars, writing that the Slavic Czechs should not allowed to rule over "noble" peoples such as the Sudeten Germans. He accused the Czechs of "sowing the dragon's teeth" as he argued that it was inevitable that Czechoslovakia would fail as it was only natural for the "superior" peoples such as the Magyars and Sudeten Germans to assert themselves.

However, Rothermere's main interest was in Hungarian revanchism. Rothermere ended his article with the statement "Return Everything!", which, translated into Magyar as mindent vissza!, became a popular slogan in Hungary. Despite the implication that Hungary should retake all of the lands lost under the Treaty of Trianon, Rothermere actually only advocated the return to Hungary of what is now southern Slovakia and the extreme western end of Ukraine together with parts of Transylvania and Vojvodina. Rothermere followed up "Hungary's Place in the Sun" with another leader titled "Europe's Powder Keg", predicating that the continuance of the Treaty of Trianon would cause another world war. Rothermere explained his support for Hungary in racial terms, arguing that it was only "natural" for "superior" peoples to dominate "inferior" peoples, and likened the situation with Magyars under Czechoslovak, Yugoslav and Romanian rule as being alike to the situation that would occur if people from Britain's colonies were ruling over the British people.

Many in England were caught off-guard by Rothermere's impassioned endorsement of the Hungarian cause, and the leader caused immense concern in Yugoslavia, Czechoslovakia and Romania, where it was believed to reflect British government policy. The Czechoslovak Foreign Minister Edvard Beneš was so concerned that he visited London to meet King George V, a man who detested Rothermere and used language that was so crude and "unkingy" that Beneš had to report to Prague that he could not possibly repeat the king's remarks in print.

In fact, Rothermere's "Justice for Hungary" campaign, which he continued until February 1939, was a source of disquiet for the Foreign Office, which complained that British relations with Czechoslovakia, Yugoslavia and Romania were constantly strained as the leaders of those nations continued to harbour the belief that Rothermere was in some way speaking for the British government. One man who was better informed was one of Rothermere's principal opponents, the Czechoslovak minister-plenipotentiary in London, Jan Masaryk. Masaryk reported to Prague that Rothermere was not acting on behalf of Whitehall, but rather on behalf of Princess von Hohenlohe. Masaryk described Rothermere as dominated both emotionally and sexually by Hohenlohe, writing that he would do anything to please her, and cynically predicting that he would lose interest in Hungarian revanchism the moment he found himself a new mistress. In a letter dated 30 April 1928, Rothermere admitted to Hohenlohe: "As I have already told you on several occasions, my interest in Hungary was aroused principally by you. I had no idea that the enumeration of Hungary's woes and her unfair treatment would trigger off such worldwide sympathy". In Geneva to attend sessions of the League of Nations, Sir Austen Chamberlain, the Foreign Secretary, told Count István Bethlen, the Hungarian Prime Minister: "[Rothermere] always writes in his paper what is popular, but he is often mistaken in that... But Lord Rothermere is the sort of person who will embrace something today, only to drop it tomorrow just as easily". Hungarian diplomats in London noted that most of the readers of the Daily Mail wanted to read about crime, scandal and sensationalism. As such the Hungarian legation staff in London reported that most Daily Mail readers were not interested in revising the Treaty of Trianon, no matter how much Rothermere hammered at the subject. Hohenlohe later described Rothermere as: "erratic, a creature of rapidly changing moods, able to back the idlest of impulses with his millions, open to any suggestion, and perfectly ruthless in carrying out any scheme that might bring him journalistic fame or personal prestige".

Despite having never visited it, Rothermere became a national hero in Hungary with every Hungarian newspaper sending a correspondent to London with a request to interview Rothermere. In the aftermath of "Hungary's Place in the Sun", Rothermere received 200,000 letters, telegrams and postcards from Hungary, which forced him to hire two translators to translate all of the mail from Magyar into English. Rothermere found himself bombarded with gifts from Hungary such as the 18th century sword of General Hadik, wood-carvings, embroideries, a golden pen from the city fathers of Budapest, and an old flag from the Revolution of 1848. The wine growers of Tokay sent Rothermere a free Balthazar (ten liters) of their best aszú wine. Over 1.2 million Hungarians signed a public letter of thanks to Rothermere for "Hungary's Place in the Sun". The Hungarian journalist Jenö Rákoski in an editorial in the Budapest newspaper Pesti Hirlap wrote: "Rothermere will have a full chapter of Hungarian history to himself". Another Hungarian journalist, Ferenc Herczeg, wrote: "Ever since Gutenberg invented printing, no other writing had such effect on the human hearts as Rothermere's articles on Hungary!" Rothermere became a revered figure in Hungary and his Christmas message sent from his villa in Palm Beach, Florida in 1928 was printed on the front page of every Hungarian newspaper. From Palm Beach, Rothermere issued a statement: "The day of liberation will come. My meetings here with representatives of public opinion here has convinced me that the sympathy of world will be on Hungary's side, if Hungary were to make a demand for the revision of the Treaty of Trianon". As he came to learn more about Hungary, Rothermere became infatuated with the Hungarians as he discovered that Hungarian society was dominated by the Magyar nobility and gentry. In particular, Rothermere was impressed by the fact that Hungarian women were not allowed to vote or hold office while franchise requirements ensured that only well-off Hungarian men were allowed to vote and hold office. Rothermere came to have very romantic ideas of Hungarian life, which described in very idealised terms as a society where the Magyar "chivalrous and warlike aristocracy" still ruled.

Rothermere's son Esmond was received with royal pomp during a visit to Budapest in 1928, and some political actors in Hungary later went so far as to inquire about Rothermere's interest in being placed on the Hungarian throne. Although Rothermere later insisted he did not invite those overtures and that he quietly deflected them, his private correspondence indicates otherwise. Rothermere very much wanted his family to become royalty, writing to his mistress in 1928: "If they want to save the monarchy in Hungary, then there is only one man able to do so-Esmond Harmsworth. No Habsburg or a royal prince from somewhere can accomplish it". Mussolini declared his support for making a Harmsworth the king of Hungary, seeing it as a way to bring British support for Hungarian revisionism. The plan to make Esmond a king was vetoed by the Magyar nobility. The ancient aristocratic families of Hungary were unwilling to accept a "parvenu" family as their royal family as it was noted that Rothermere had been born a commoner, making the Harmsworths unsuitable as a royal family in their view.

In 1927, the American-Hungarian Transatlantic Committee started raising funds for a non-stop transatlantic flight as a way of publicising criticism of the Treaty of Trianon. By 1930, the committee had raised only $5,000 in donations in the United States and Canada plus $45 in Hungary, which were quite insufficient to buy a modern aeroplane capable of crossing the Atlantic. At that point, Rothermere stepped in to donate the necessary funds. In 1931, Rothermere paid for a nonstop 3200-mile flight by a Royal Hungarian Air Force Fiat BR. 3 named Justice for Hungary from Harbour Grace in the Dominion of Newfoundland to Budapest on 15 July 1931, which set a record for longevity at the time. The radio navigation equipment on Justice for Hungary, which cost £4,000, were also paid for by Rothermere. At the time, crossing the Atlantic Ocean non-stop was highly risky, and the flight attracted much attention. Rothermere purchased estates in Hungary in case Britain fell to a Soviet invasion. There is a memorial to Rothermere in Budapest.

== 1929 election and United Empire Party ==
Rothermere was very strongly opposed to the Baldwin government's decision to lower the age of female suffrage from 30 to 21, using his newspapers to undermine Baldwin's leadership by warning that allowing young women to vote would swing the 1929 election to the Labour Party. Rothermere's campaign against the "flapper vote" resounded strongly with much of the Conservative base, and resulted in a number of messages of opposition to the Conservative central office. The popular image of "flappers" was as frivolous, sex-obsessed young women who were both silly and selfish.

After the Conservatives did lose the 1929 election, Rothermere's feud with Baldwin, whom he called a "semi-socialist" and "intoxicated with excitement", reached its height. As the Labour Party under Ramsay MacDonald had not won a majority, a second general election was expected at any moment. Rothermere demanded that Baldwin submit to him a list of potential cabinet ministers and allow him the power of veto in exchange for the support of his newspapers, a demand that Baldwin rejected. One of the major themes of The Daily Mail during Rothermere's proprietorship was support for the continuance of the Raj and much of Rothermere's opposition to Baldwin was based upon the belief that Baldwin was not sufficiently opposed to Indian independence. In November 1929, when MacDonald proposed Dominion status for India, the Daily Mail ran a frontpage article by Churchill condemning the Dominion status for India as the beginning of the end of the British Empire. To apply further pressure, in February 1930 Rothermere and Beaverbrook founded a new party, the United Empire Party. They threw the full support of their newspapers behind the United Empire Party in an attempt to split the Conservative Party with the objective of bringing down Baldwin, either forcing his resignation or having him deposed by the Conservative MPs. Beaverbrook and Rothermere then intended to impose a puppet leader upon the Conservative Party who would serve their interests, an aspiration which generated much opposition within the Conservative ranks. However, their newspapers were widely read by Conservatives, so the attacks on Baldwin had considerable effect, all the more as many Tory voters were deeply dissatisfied with his leadership.

In a leadership vote in early 1930, Baldwin rejected the demands of the media moguls in a famous speech that accused Rothermere and Beaverbrook of attempting to hijack the Conservative Party: "We are told that unless we make peace with these noblemen, candidates are to be run all over the country. The Lloyd George candidates at the last election smelt; these will stink. The challenge has been issued... I accept, just as I accepted the challenge of the TUC". In a speech at Caxton Hall in June 1930, he read out the letter from Rothermere demanding the right to veto members of a potential Conservative cabinet and commented that: "There is nothing more curious in modern evolution than the effect of an enormous fortune rapidly made and the control of newspapers of your own... It goes to your head like wine, and you'll find in all these cases attempts have been made outside the province of journalism to dictate, to dominate, to blackmail... A more preposterous and insolent demand has never been made on the leader of any political party. I repudiate it with contempt and I will fight that attempt at domination to the end". Baldwin won the support of the Conservative MPs, but only with 150 MPs voting for him and 80 against.

The MacDonald government brought forward a conference known as the Round Table, which for the first time proposed giving the Indians at least some say in the ruling of India, a policy that Baldwin was prepared to support with reservations. Much to Rothermere's glee, the proposal for Dominion status for India fell through largely because the Indians could not agree on terms for Dominion status. Muhammad Ali Jinnah of the Muslim League demanded that Indian Muslims have the special status of a "state-within-the-state" together with a certain number of seats reserved for Indian Muslims in the projected Indian Parliament in the proposed Dominion to protect them against the perceived threat of Hindu domination, a demand that Jawaharlal Nehru and Mahatma Gandhi of the Congress Party rejected. At the Round Table talks, a consensus emerged that the Raj would hence forward control defence, foreign policy, high finance, internal security, and the civil service along with the ultimate supremacy of London over India with other responsibilities such as health, transportation and education to be assigned to Indians. Though this was far short of independence, it was widely believed at the time that this was the first step towards Indian independence and generated much opposition from the "die-hards" opposed to the Indians having any role in ruling India. In 1930, Rothermere wrote a series of leaders under the title "If We Lose India!", claiming that granting India independence would be the end of Britain as a great power. In addition, Rothermere predicted that Indian independence would end worldwide white supremacy as inevitably, the peoples of the other British colonies in Asia, Africa, and the Americas would also demand independence. The decision of MacDonald to open the Round Table Talks in 1930 was greeted by The Daily Mail as the beginning of the end of Britain as a great power. As part of its crusade against Indian independence, The Daily Mail published a series of articles portraying the peoples of India as ignorant, barbarous, filthy and fanatical, arguing that the Raj was necessary to save India from the Indians, whom The Daily Mail argued were not capable of handling independence. Rothermere took a "no surrender" line in regards to India, using his newspapers and the United Empire Party to advocate no concessions to the Indians. Besides for his support for the Raj, Rothermere believed that the issue of India was Baldwin's "Achilles heel" that would bring him down as Conservative leader. By contrast, Beaverbrook was more interested in promoting a protectionist policy of imperial preference for the British empire as the best way of resolving the Great Depression and while opposed to Indian independence was open towards the Indians having a say in ruling India. Baldwin responded to Rothermere's attacks by citing numerous false statements made about his views of India in The Daily Mail.

Beaverbrook was hesitant about the precise purpose of the United Empire Party as he could never quite decide if he wanted to depose Baldwin or just be afforded the respect he felt he deserved within the Conservative Party. Beaverbrook felt that his origins as a self-made millionaire Canadian businessman made him an outsider in the Conservative Party. Rothermere by contrast was committed to deposing Baldwin and replacing him with a more right-wing leader. Baldwin greatly detested both Rothermere and Beaverbrook, saying to "call them swine was to libel a very clean, decent animal". In a speech, Baldwin charged that the way that Beaverbrook and Rothermere were attempting to use their vast fortunes to alter the Conservative party to their liking was "the most obvious peril to democracy". Despite his dislike of Beaverbrook, Baldwin met with him several times to promise that the Conservatives might change their policies on protectionism if he would cease his support of the United Empire Party. Baldwin refused to have any talks with Rothermere, whom he regarded as a megalomaniac with whom it was pointless to negotiate with. Beaverbrook temporarily abandoned his support of the United Empire Party in March 1930, but resumed his alliance with Rothermere in May 1930.

In a risky move, Baldwin ordered a number of Conservative MPs holding safe Tory seats to resign to cause by-elections with the aim to "expose the real weakness of the press lords". The Conservative Central Office advised against this strategy, warning that many ordinary Conservative voters were deeply unhappy with Baldwin's leadership and the by-elections might have "disastrous results-even break up the party altogether". Baldwin made rejecting "the preposterous and insolent demands" of the "press lords" his signature issue. Though Baldwin was unpopular within his party, the campaign by Rothermere and Beaverbrook to depose him and replace him with a puppet leader who would do their bidding was even more unpopular. Most Conservative MPs and party members did not relish the prospect of their party being turned into a vehicle for Rothermere and Beaverbrook, which proved to be Baldwin's strongest card. In July 1930, Neville Chamberlain of the Conservative Research Office met with Rothermere and Beaverbrook in an attempt to broker a compromise, and the demands of the two media moguls were widely seen as causing the failure of the talks. In a speech, Baldwin exclaimed that "the disgusting one-sided alliance with the lunatics has ended". Many Conservative voters and MPs wanted to replace Baldwin with Chamberlain, who was seen as a rising star within the Tory ranks. Though many urged Chamberlain to challenge Baldwin, he refused despite having excellent chances as he felt that to depose Baldwin at this point would be seen as the "revolting" triumph of Rothermere and Beaverbrook and to win the Conservative leadership at this time would make him the hostage of the two "press barons". Rothermere's reputation as a megalomaniac with erratic tendencies helped to win Baldwin a measure of sympathy despite the widespread belief that he was an incompetent leader with many Conservatives seeing him as "too timid, weak and pacifist". Baldwin was also helped by the fact that Winston Churchill, one of the Conservative "die-hards" opposed to any devolution of power to the Indians, chose not to co-ordinate his campaign to depose him with Rothermere and Beaverbrook. The fear of accepting "press dictation" as it was called at the time with policies for the Conservative Party to be decided by leaders in The Daily Mail and The Daily Express was very strong within the ranks of the Conservative leaders and MPs. Despite a general dislike of Baldwin, the possibility of "press dictation" was disliked even more.

In the Bromley by-election of September 1930, the Rothermere newspapers campaigned hard for the United Empire Party candidate, who came close to defeating the Conservative candidate. Though most Conservative leaders were determined not to see Baldwin replaced with a puppet of Rothermere and Beaverbrook, there was a deep dissatisfaction with Baldwin's leadership amongst the Conservative rank-and-file, and by the fall of 1930 a number of local Conservative party associations were on the brink of revolt. In October 1930, Baldwin called another leadership vote, which he won with the support of 462 MPs with 116 MPs voting against him. In a by-election in Islington East in February 1931, the United Empire candidate pushed the Conservative candidate into third place, which led to demands that Baldwin resign as Conservative leader. However, the way that the United Empire party candidate had divided the right-way vote in Islington East to give a normally safe Tory seat to Labour generated a strong reaction within the Conservative ranks. Both Rothermere and Beaverbrook were considered to be useful to the Conservative party because of their vast wealth and newspaper empires, but at the same time, their efforts to threaten MPs via unfavourable newspaper coverage was considered to be a form of crass backmail.

In March 1931, a by-election was called for the constituency of St. George's. The by-election was widely seen as a sort of referendum on Baldwin's leadership, and both Rothermere and Beaverbrook aggressively used their newspapers to campaign for the United Empire Party candidate. Sensing defeat, the Conservative candidate dropped out, and for a time Baldwin considered running. Alfred Duff Cooper volunteered instead and ran as a Conservative loyal to Baldwin. It was believed that if Duff Cooper lost the by-election, Baldwin would have to resign and as such the by-election attracted much more media attention than usual for a by-election. Though most of the Conservative party leaders wanted Baldwin to resign by this point, the fear of the party being taken over by the "press lords" proved even stronger. Baldwin campaigned for Duff Cooper and in a speech denounced Beaverbrook and Rothermere, saying: "What the proprietorship of these papers is aiming at is power, and power without responsibility-the prerogative of the harlot throughout the ages...this contest is not a contest as to who is to lead the party, but as to who is to appoint the leader of the party". Baldwin's dignified speech which stood in stark contrast to the often hysterical and shrill claims of the Beaverbrook and Rothermere newspapers made a very favourable impression. Duff Cooper won the St. George's by-election by a comfortable margin, which marked the failure of the United Empire party and saved Baldwin's leadership.

== "Enthusiast" for fascism ==
In the 1930s Rothermere used his newspapers to try to influence British politics, particularly reflecting his strong support of the appeasement of Nazi Germany; historian Martin Pugh considers him "perhaps the most influential single propagandist for fascism between the wars". In 1937, the Daily Mail had a daily circulation of 1,580,000 subscribers and was the only popular broadsheet newspaper with a predominantly middle-class readership, making Rothermere into an influential media mogul. The British historian Richard Griffiths made a distinction between "enthusiasts" for fascism, which were a group of mostly upper class British people who favoured closer ties with Nazi Germany and usually (but not always) also favoured having Britain adopt fascism vs. the "appeasers" who were government officials favoured concessions to the Third Reich for a variety of economic and strategical reasons. Griffiths noted it was possible to be both an "enthusiast" and an "appeaser", but that the two groups were not one and the same, and it was unhelpful to lump the two groups together as one. Griffiths wrote that Rothermere - whose newspapers he described as being "consistently pro-Nazi" from 1930 onward - was an 'enthusiast' for fascism as his views were those of a private individual outside of the government.

Rothermere visited and corresponded with Adolf Hitler on multiple occasions, such as after the 1930 elections that saw the Nazi Party dramatically increase the number of its seats in the Reichstag, which Rothermere welcomed. Shortly after the Nazis scored their breakthrough in the Reichstag elections on 14 September 1930, winning 107 seats, Rothermere went to Munich to interview Hitler. In an article published in Daily Mail on 24 September 1930, Rothermere wrote: "These young Germans have discovered, as I am glad to note that the young men and women of England are discovering, that is no good trusting the old politicians. Accordingly, they have formed, as I should like to see our British youth form, a parliamentary party of their own...We can do nothing to check this movement [the Nazis], and I believe it would be a blunder for the British people to take up an attitude of hostility towards it". Rothermere expressed the hope that Hitler would soon become German chancellor. He praised Hitler's foreign policy goals as he wrote that he wanted to see the Germans establishing a "great national combination under German hegemony" in Eastern Europe in order for "a strong, sane government to set against the pressure of Soviet lunaticism". In gratitude for this foreign support, Hitler granted Rothermere an exclusive interview. In response to criticism of his article, Rothermere used his usual gendered language, praising the Nazis as "manly" while dismissing his critics as "the old women of three countries-France, Germany and our own." Rothermere wrote that Hitler was a man who was changing the world for the better and his critics were motivated only by jealousy as he wrote: "A new idea invariably produces this effect upon the pompous pundits who pontificate in our weekly reviews and those old-fashioned morning newspapers whose sales and influence alike steadily sink month by month towards the vanishing point".

On 5 October 1930, Rothermere published an article in The Daily Mail where he denied being anti-semitic, but wrote: "I freely admit that the Jewish race has shown conspicuous political unwisdom since the War. Prominent British Jews have brought great unpopularity upon their community because of clamorous persistence in pressing for maintenance, at the expense of the hard-driven taxpayers, of the Jewish National Home in Palestine, which no Jews above the charity line want at all...Those on the inside of public affairs feel furthermore a good deal of resentment against the activities of wealthy Jewish individuals and organizations who try by every means financial, social, political and personal to influence British Government Departments and members of parliament for ends serviceable to Jewish interests....Tactlessness always has been one of the outstanding defects of the children of Israel. British Jews do not err in this respect nearly as much as their kinsmen of the Continent. Nevertheless, they would do well to remember that the fact of leadership of the Bolshevist campaign against civilization and religion being almost entirely in the hands of men of their blood has done inevitable and incalculable harm to the reputation of the Hebrew race in every country of its adoption."

Starting in December 1931, Rothermere opened up talks with Oswald Mosley under which terms the Daily Mail would support his party. The talks were drawn out largely because Mosley understood that Rothermere was a megalomaniac who wanted to use the New Party for his own purposes as he sought to impose terms and conditions in exchange for the support of the Daily Mail such as placing former leaders of the United Empire Party in key positions in the BUF and abandoning his plans for an Italian-style "corporate state", demands that Mosley rejected. Mosley who was equally egotistical wanted Rothermere's support, but only on his own terms. The talks required the intervention of the Italian ambassador in London, Dino Grandi, who served as a mediator between Mosley and Rothermere. Grandi in his reports to Mussolini about the talks compared Rothermere to playing a role analogous to the Italian conservatives and liberals who wanted to use the Fascist movement to crush Socialism in Italy and abolish democracy while he compared Mosley to Il Duce, reporting that Mosley was a right-wing revolutionary who planned to use Rothermere to obtain power and then disregard him.

In 1932, Rothermere sent Princess von Hohenlohe to contact the deposed German emperor, Wilhelm II, to discuss a scheme to effect a restoration of the monarchy once Hitler came to power. Rothermere believed that Hitler was a monarchist who was committed to restoring the House of Hohenzollern and volunteered his services as a conduit. In July 1933, Rothermere visited Germany and defended the new regime in his article "Youth Triumphant". Writing "from somewhere in Naziland", Rothermere stated: "Our 'parlor Bolsheviks' and 'cultural Communists' have started a campaign of denunciation against Nazi 'atrocities', which as anyone who visits Germany quickly discovers for himself, consist merely of a few isolated acts of violence such are inevitable among a nation as half as big as ours...In the last days of the pre-Hitler regime, there twenty times as many Jewish government officials in Germany as had existed before the war. Israelites of international attachments were insinuating themselves into key positions of the German administrative machine...It is from such abuses that Hitler has freed Germany". By this point, Rothermere had abandoned any support for democracy as he was disgusted by the National Government, which he saw as a result of an "unholy alliance" between MacDonald and Baldwin. Rothermere was furious that the government kept giving the Indians more power, which he believed to be the first steps towards independence. Finally, Rothermere believed that the Conservative Party that he joined as a young man no longer existed as he regarded the modern Conservative party as a hollowed out shell.

Though the United Empire Party had proved to be a failure, Rothermere continued his campaign against Baldwin and the Government of India Act. The campaign against the India Act was regionalised in terms of support, being limited to South Lancashire, the Home Counties and the resort towns along the English Channel. In South Lancashire opposition to the India Act was strong out of fears that the textile mills would lose access to the Indian market. In the Home Counties and in the resort towns, a disproportionate number of the members of the executive boards of the local Conservative constituency associations were either former civil servants of the Raj or retired Indian Army officers, both of whom had strong fears about the potential loss of "the jewel in the crown of the Empire" as India was often called. A recurring memory for the Conservative MPs in such areas was being "hustled by their constituents who read the Rothermere press".

Starting in 1933, Rothermere used his newspapers to produce vivid, dramatic and apocalyptic accounts of strategical bombing, which vastly exaggerated the power of bombing. In November 1933, an article under his name appeared in The Daily Mail which warned: "If we fail to fill this vital gap in our national defense it is quite possible that many of us will live to see our country confronted at a few hours notice between the acceptance of a humiliating ultimatum and virtual annihilation from the air". Rothermere agreed with Baldwin's famous statement that "the bomber will always get through", arguing there was no way possible to stop bombers once the aircraft had taken off and the only way to avert war was to build a gigantic bombing fleets to deter anyone who might wish to bomb Britain by threatening similar devastation on the nation that might wish to bomb Britain, hence the title of his article "We Need 5,000 Planes".

For a time in 1934 the Rothermere papers championed the British Union of Fascists (BUF), and were again the only major papers to do so. On 15 January 1934 the Daily Mail published a Rothermere-written editorial entitled "Hurrah for the Blackshirts", praising Oswald Mosley for his "sound, commonsense, Conservative doctrine". Rothermere's support for the BUF was a gambit to push the Conservative Party further to the right. The Daily Mail's coverage of the BUF tended to focus on issues that Rothermere about cared the most such as holding together the British Empire, especially in regard to India. For an example, when William Joyce gave a speech at a BUF rally in Nottingham in 1934, the Daily Mail devoted most of its coverage of the rally to Joyce's condemnation of a recently released White Paper relating to the Government of India Act, which proposing giving more power to the Indians, as weakening the Raj. The implication of the article in The Daily Mail was that Conservative voters were switching their loyalty from the Conservative-dominated National Government to the BUF because of the Government of India White Paper. By contrast, Action, the newspaper of the BUF, in its coverage of the same speech by Joyce gave devoted most of its attention to his condemnation of democracy and praise for Nazism.

On 7 June 1934, violence erupted at a BUF rally at Olympia Park when Communist hecklers who attempted to disrupt a speech by Mosley were beaten up. The Olympia Park rally was not the first time the BUF had engaged in violence, but it was the first time the violence was recorded by the film cameras, and in the week that followed the newsreel footage of the Olympia Park rally was widely shown in cinemas all over Britain. The newsreel footage of the hecklers being assaulted by the Blackshirts while Mosley clearly approved of the violence did much to turn public opinion against the BUF, which acquired a thuggish image. The newsreels showed Mosley from his place on the podium expressing his thanks as the hecklers were beaten bloody before his very eyes, which showed the BUF violence was not the work of a few overzealous members, but instead sanctioned by him. In July 1934, Rothermere ended his support of the BUF. The reasons for Rothermere's turn against the BUF have been much debated. Pugh argued the most likely explanation was that Rothermere had wanted to use the BUF as a wedge to pull the Conservative Party further to the right, and after the violence at the Olympia Park it was evident that the BUF could not play that role. Pugh argued that it was very unlikely that Rothermere was opposed to violence per se, noting the way in which he and his newspapers always found a way to justify Nazi violence as his newspapers portrayed the Night of Long Knives on 30 June 1934 as a justified move. Pugh further noted that the Rothermere newspapers had praised the BUF in the winter and spring of 1934 precisely for engaging in violence, which made the claim that Rothermere was disgusted by the violence at Olympia Park very unlikely.

In 1932, Newfoundland went bankrupt under the impact of the Great Depression, and in 1933 it reverted from being a Dominion to a colony again as the condition of a British bail-out. In 1934, the governing British commission appointed a royal commission under Gordon Bradley to examine how the Rothermere-owned Anglo-Newfoundland Corporation treated its workers in Grand Falls. The chief commissioner for Newfoundland, Sir John Hope Simpson, wrote in his diary: "It is the Congo all over again, so we are putting a commission of inquiry into the labour situation in the forests. Lord Rothermere and the Daily Mail are likely to have something to howl about, and we are going to be most unpopular in high quarters." Bradley reported that the workers at the Anglo-Newfoundland company were "grossly underpaid", with loggers and their families being "reduced to a standard of living below even tolerable existence". Rothermere was outraged by the report, and threatened to shut down the Anglo-Newfoundland company's operations as he observed that there were other places in the world where it was possible to buy paper and pulp. There were also fears that the publication of the report would set off a strike in Grand Falls. The commission brokered a compromise under which the loggers were to be paid 25 Newfoundland dollars per month, but the compromise was a negotiated instead of legislated settlement, which left open the option that the Anglo-Newfoundland company could always rescind the wage increases.

== Interest in the RAF ==
Rothermere was an advocate of British rearmament, especially with the Royal Air Force. The Rothermere newspapers were in the words of Reid Gannon "almost obsessional" in their demands for more spending on the RAF, which reflected Rothemere's belief that air power was the technology of the future that would decide wars. However, the principal enemy Rothermere envisioned as the most likely was the Soviet Union, not Germany. Rothermere believed that there was a serious possibility of the Soviet Union conquering Great Britain, which led him to purchase an estate in Hungary, to which he might escape to if such an event occurred. In the 1930s Rothermere fought for increased defence spending by Britain. He wrote about it in his 1939 book My Fight to Rearm Britain. He seemed to regard the Fascist movement chiefly as a bulwark against Bolshevism, while apparently remaining blind to some of the movement's dangers. In regards to Asia, Rothermere used his newspapers to advocate a new Anglo-Japanese alliance against both the Soviet Union and China. Likewise, Rothermere used his newspapers to urge British recognition of the Japanese sham state of Manchukuo, and several times had his correspondents visit Manchukuo to write laudatory accounts of life there.

In 1934, Rothermere ordered a Mercury-engined version of the Bristol Type 135 cabin monoplane for his own use as part of a campaign to popularise commercial aviation. First flying in 1935, the Bristol Type 142 caused great interest in Air Ministry circles because its top speed of 307 mph was higher than that of any Royal Air Force fighter in service. Lord Rothermere presented the aircraft (named "Britain First") to the nation for evaluation as a bomber, and in early 1936 the modified design was taken into production as the Blenheim Mk. I.

Rothermere felt there was a possibility of Germany going to war with Britain because of the colonial issue. Rothermere was well aware that Hitler wanted the return of all of Germany's former African colonies, and was equally aware that Britain had no intention of returning any of the former colonies. Rothermere was often privately depressed as he feared that the colonial issue would one day lead to a new Anglo-German war. In October 1934, Rothermere wrote in a letter to J. C. C. Davidson: "I have the belief that this war will start sometime next year when it is least expected." In a letter to the War Secretary, Rothermere wrote "it looks as through the blow may fall next year" while in a letter to the First Lord of the Admiralty he warned of "Hitler war against the West". In May 1935, another ghost-written article under Rothermere's name appeared in the Daily Mail with the title "Wanted: 10,000 Planes". Addison noted that before the First World War, Northcliffe had run articles depicting in vivid terms a German conquest of Britain as a way to pressure the Liberal government to spend more on the Royal Navy and increase the circulation of his newspapers, and Rothermere's dire predications about the power of the Luftwaffe to inflict catastrophic damage on British cities were in the same vein. However, there was a crucial difference in that Northcliffe used his "invasion scare" articles to criticise the government for being too willing to appease Germany while Rothermere used his "bombing scare" articles as a reason for the appeasement of Germany. In 1935, Rothermere founded the National Air League to campaign for more spending on the RAF, especially Bomber Command. Collin Brooks, the Daily Mail journalist whom Rothermere hired to write his biography noted he was often "gloomy" as he noted that successive British governments kept rejecting the German demand for the return of the former African colonies. As one of the richest men in Britain, Rothermere supported fascism as the best way of preserving the social order, but as an old-fashioned imperialist whose formative years were spent opposing German bids for "world power status", he always feared the possibility of a colonial conflict between Germany and Britain.

On 7 June 1935, Joachim von Ribbentrop, Hitler's ambassador-at-large, lunched with Rothermere in London and complained about a speech he had given in the House of Lords calling for more spending on the RAF. Brooks, who was present at the meeting as part of his duties as Rothermere's biographer, wrote in his diary: "To this, Lord Rothermere replied that the speech was not directed against Germany. Its one and only purpose had been to awaken the people of Great Britain to the dangers of air warfare. No real friendship, said Lord Rothermere, was possible between a heavily armed nation and a nation relatively unarmed. To this, von Ribbentrop replied by saying that nothing would give Germany greater satisfaction than a heavily armed Britain. For Britain he declared Germany had nothing, but friendliness".

== Amateur diplomat ==
The break with the BUF did not change Rothermere's views of Nazi Germany. The Rothermere newspapers were the only mainstream British newspapers to advocate an alliance with Germany against the Soviet Union. The British historian Franklin Reid Gannon wrote that Rothermere was "very near to being unbalanced" in his thinking with regards to the Soviet Union. Rothermere managed to convince himself that there was a real possibility of the Soviet Union invading and subjecting Britain. Despite having sharply differing views of the Third Reich, Rothermere allowed Churchill to write articles in the Daily Mail criticising the National Government for insufficient spending on the Royal Air Force with a special focus on the need to build more bombers. Both Rothermere and Churchill had an unlimited faith in the power of strategical bombing to win wars, which led both to argue that Bomber Command have the pride of place in regard to rearmament spending. Though Churchill was paid well for his articles, in a letter to his wife in August 1934, he wrote he was "disgusted" by the pro-Nazi tone of the Daily Mail, writing Rothermere wanted the United Kingdom to "be strongly armed and frightfully obsequious at the same...it was a more practical attitude than our socialist politicians. They wish us to remain disarmed and exceedingly abusive".

In December 1934, Rothermere visited Berlin as the guest of his friend Joachim von Ribbentrop. During his visit, Rothermere was publicly thanked in a speech by Josef Goebbels for the Daily Mails pro-German coverage of the Saarland referendum, under which the people of the Saarland had the choices of voting to remain under the rule of the League of Nations; join France; or rejoin Germany. On 19 December 1934 Rothermere, his son Esmond, his favourite reporter George Ward Price and the merchant banker Sir Ernest Tennant all had dinner with Hitler at the Reich Chancellery. Rothermere came away from his meeting with Hitler convinced that the major problems in Anglo-German relations was the British refusal to return Tanganyika, Togoland, and Cameroons to Germany. To show his thanks for the dinner at the Reich Chancellery, Rothermere hosted a dinner for Hitler at the Hotel Adlon, the most expensive and prestigious hotel in Germany. In an account of his German visit in the Daily Mail, Rothermere waxed elegant that: "Their interests, our own, and those of the entire civilised world will be best served by close and friendly co-operation between us". Rothermere held the belief that the Foreign Office was not committed to improving Anglo-German relations and started to work as an amateur diplomat as his own. A Hungarian lawyer who worked for Rothermere wrote: "Rothermere conducted his own foreign policy...At even later day, his Lordship [Rothermere] found that the Anglo-German diplomatic service does not work well and acting on his own accord employed her [Hohenlohe] to act as a substitute for the official agents until he came to the conclusion in early 1938 that the British and German diplomatic services are on excellent terms". Upon his return from Germany, Churchill criticised Rothermere, saying he could not understand how Rothermere had been able to shake hands with "those murderous Nazis".

In March 1935, impressed by the arguments put forward by Ribbentrop for the return of the former German colonies in Africa, Rothermere published a leader entitled "Germany Must Have Elbow Room". In his leader, Rothermere argued that the Treaty of Versailles was too harsh towards the Reich and claimed that the German economy was being crippled by the loss of the German colonial empire in Africa as he argued that without African colonies to exploit that the German economic recovery from the Great Depression was fragile and shallow. Robert Vansittart, the permanent undersecretary at the Foreign Office, was outraged by Rothermere's article, writing that it was not helpful to have a British press baron championing the German demand that Britain return the former German African colonies. In a memo, Vansittart wrote that it was best to let the article "past in stony silence" as Rothermere "flew from topic to topic" and "it would be a waste of time and not very dignified to follow him with denials". In 1935, President Edvard Beneš of Czechoslovakia signed a defensive alliance with the Soviet Union. Taking a claim straight from Nazi propaganda, Rothermere had the Daily Mail attack Czechoslovakia as the aggressor, claiming that Germany was now threatened by the potential for Soviet forces to be in Czechoslovakia. In October 1935, Rothermere supported the Italian invasion of Ethiopia and was opposed to the government's half-hearted policy of imposing sanctions on Italy via the League of Nations. Rothermere sent Brooks to Geneva to write an article calling for the end of the League of Nations as Brooks wrote the League would "make our sons into the hirings of some unworthy race". He had the Daily Mail support the Hoare-Laval Pact of December 1935 that would have essentially rewarded Italy for invading Ethiopia.

In 1936, Rothermere took an increasingly apocalyptic and hysterical tone in his writings as he became convinced that Western civilization was on the brink of destruction. The victory of the Front populaire led by the Socialist Léon Blum in the elections for the French National Assembly in May 1936 followed by the outbreak of the Spanish Civil War in July convinced Rothermere that Communists were taking over Europe. The Soviet intervention in the Spanish civil war greatly upset Rothermere who wrote that a "Red victory" in Spain would mean the loss of Portugal, which in turn "would mean the destruction of all that splendid work of national development which has done by the strong and enlightened government of Dr. Salazar." Rothermere believed that a Communist government would grant the Soviet Navy bases, which would allow the Soviet Union to threaten British shipping on the Western approaches. In an article entitled "Get Together with Germany" published in July 1936, Rothermere praised the Nazi regime as a force for order in a world that he depicted as descending into chaos as he wrote: "...this powerful, patriotic and superbly organised country constitutes an element of stability amid those rising tendencies of disorder and disruption, which are becoming increasingly and seriously manifest in Europe". At Rothermere's urging, George Ward Price, the "extra-special correspondent" of the Daily Mail wrote an article on 21 September 1936 in Mail that called "Bolshevism" the main danger to the British empire and wrote that "if Hitler did not exist, all of Western Europe might soon be clamoring for such a champion". In 1936, Rothermere was an ardent supporter of the new king, Edward VIII, whom he believed was sympathetic towards his policies. During the Abdication crisis of 1936, the Rothermere newspapers supported the king against Baldwin, arguing for his right to keep the throne and marry Mrs. Wallis Simpson. Rothermere only allowed letters to the editor supporting Edward to be published in his newspapers to convey the impression that the British people were overwhelmingly on the side of king.

From 5 to 8 January 1937, Rotheremere stayed with Hitler and Goebbels at the Berghof in the Bavarian Alps. Hitler and Rothermere talked about the desirability of an Anglo-German alliance against the Soviet Union, and Rothermere did not challenge Hitler's claims that Winston Churchill worked for Jewish businessmen and that with the exception of the Rothermeres Jews owned all of the newspapers in Britain. Goebbels wrote in his diary: "Lord Rothermere, a real Englishman. John Bull. Very generous views. If all Englishmen thought like him! Against Versailles, for our rearmament, for our colonies, friendship between Berlin and London. Against the diplomats. Philps almost fainting. I talked with him non-stop. At the end he calls me 'the greatest propagandist in the world. If you don't want to work in Germany anymore, I will hire you for a salary ten times what you are earning'. We both laugh. I think I have won his heart. It is worth talking to such people". Goebbels wrote in his diary after having dinner with Rothermere that "he is totally with us". Goebbels described Rothermere in his diary as "strongly anti-Jewish" and complained that Hohenlohe who was also staying at the Berghof with him was "very pushy". In the evening, Rothermere watched a film Stosstrupp 1917 (Shock Troop 1917) with Hitler in the Berghof's private cinema. Goebbels described Rothermere as deeply moved by the film. After Rothermere left the Berghof, Hitler and Goebbels had a private meeting about him. It was agreed that Rothermere's support for an Anglo-German alliance in his newspapers made him useful to the Reich, and everything should be done to continue to cultivate him. To further assist with Rothermere's word, Goebbels ordered the German newspapers not to mention Rothermere's visit to the Berghof, which thus passed unnoticed at the time.

In an article in February 1937, Rothermere called Czechoslovakia "a sham" and wrote that the Czechs "were a crafty race" who would soon "rue their evil-doings" now that Hitler ruled Germany. In an article in May 1937, Rothermere called for Britain, France, Belgium and South Africa to return the former German African colonies, writing this was the best way to prevent another world war. In regard to the Sino-Japanese war, Rothermere used the Daily Mail to attack the British policy of supporting China and urged that the British government should make a deal accepting China as being in the Japanese sphere of influence in exchange for a promise from Japan not to seize any of the British colonies in Asia. In the Sudetenland crisis of 1938, Rothermere used The Daily Mail to attack Beneš, whom Rothermere noted disapprovingly in a leader in July 1938 had signed an alliance with the Soviet Union in 1935, leading him to accuse Beneš of turning "Czechoslovakia into a corridor for Russia against Germany". Rothermere concluded his leader: "If Czechoslovakia becomes involved in a war, the British nation will say to the Prime Minister with one voice: 'Keep out of it!'" On another occasion, on 1 October 1938, Rothermere sent Hitler a telegram in support of Germany's occupation of the Sudetenland, and expressed the hope that "Adolf the Great" would become a popular figure in Britain. In November 1938, Rothermere went to Hungary to attend the celebrations that followed the annexation of Czechoslovakia following the First Vienna Award.

Numerous secret British MI5 papers relating to the war years were declassified and released in 2005. They show that Rothermere wrote to Hitler in 1939 congratulating him for the annexation of Czechoslovakia, and encouraging him to invade Romania. He described Hitler's work as "great and superhuman". Despite the way that Hitler had just violated the Munich Agreement by turning the Czech part of Czechoslovakia into the Protectorate of Bohemia and Moravia, Rothermere warmly supported the annexation and reflecting his pro-Hungarian views urged a German invasion of Romania, which he reminded Hitler was rich in oil. The British journalist John Simpson noted that Rothermere was somewhat unusual in supporting the German violation of the Munich Agreement, which turned many of the other British 'enthusiasts' for fascism against the Third Reich.

The MI5 papers also show that at the time Rothermere was paying an annual retainer of £5,000 to Stephanie von Hohenlohe (suspected by the French, British and Americans of being a German spy) as he wanted her to bring him closer to Hitler's inner circle. Rothermere also encouraged her to promote Germany to her circle of influential English contacts. She was known as "London's leading Nazi hostess". MI5 had been monitoring her since her arrival in Britain in the 1920s and regarded her as "an extremely dangerous person". As the Second World War loomed, Rothermere stopped the payments and their relationship deteriorated into threats and lawsuits, which she lost. The lawsuit greatly damaged Rothermere's reputation as his secret dabbling as an amateur diplomat all through the 1920s-1930s came to light and Hohenlohe produced letters by him where he declared: "You know I have always been a fervent admirer of the Fuhrer".

Rothermere was opposed to the "guarantee" of Poland given by Chamberlain in the House of Commons on 31 March 1939. Given his long-standing support of Hungarian claims to Transylvania, Rothermere was outraged by the decision of the Chamberlain government on 13 April 1939 to "guarantee" Romania. During the Danzig crisis, Rothermere played the role of an amateur diplomat, attempting to avert a war as he wrote to both Nazi leaders and British politicians. Rothermere wanted the Danzig crisis to end with a Munich-type deal under which Poland would allow the Free City of Danzig (modern Gdańsk, Poland) to "go home to the Reich" in exchange for which Germany would not invade Poland. The support offered by the Rothermere newspapers together with the Beaverbrook newspapers to the German claim to the Free City of Danzig helped to persuade Hitler that Britain would not go to war for Poland.

On 27 June 1939, Rothermere sent a telegram to Hitler appealing to him not to invade Poland that read: ""My Dear Führer, I have watched with understanding and interest the progress of your great and superhuman work in regenerating your country." He sought to rebut the Nazi claim of British "encirclement" of Germany as he wrote that there was: "no policy which involves the encirclement of Germany, and that no British government could exist which embraced such a policy. The British people, now like Germany strongly rearmed, regard the German people with admiration as valorous adversaries in the past, but I am sure that there is no problem between our two countries which cannot be settled by consultation and negotiation." He appealed to Hitler to renew the "old friendship", saying he would be regarded as a national hero like Frederick the Great if he took such a step and stated: "I have always felt that you are essentially one who hates war and desires peace." Rothermere appealed to Hitler to call for an international conference to resolve "the Danzig problem"."

On 6 July 1939, Rothermere sent another telegram to the deputy Führer Rudolf Hess asking him to help organise an international conference to resolve "all outstanding problems"." Rothermere concluded: "Could I ask you to use your influence in this direction. There is really no cleavage between the interests of Germany and Britain. This great world of ours is big enough for both countries."" On 7 July 1939, Rothermere sent a telegram to Joachim von Ribbentrop, now serving as the German foreign minister that read: "Our two great Nordic countries should pursue resolutely a policy of appeasement for, whatever anyone may say, our two great countries should be the leaders of the world." In his telegram to Ribbentrop, Rothermere was supportive of the Nazi claims, writing about what he called "the grave iniquities" of the Treaty of Versailles. Rothermere believed that such a conference would resolve the Danzig crisis as he wrote: "I am optimistic enough to believe that even before the end of this year, glaring grievances can be redressed."

== Last days ==
When Britain declared war on Germany on 3 September 1939, Rothermere in public supported the war. However, Brooks noted in his diary on 9 September 1939: "He has sent a window-dressing telegram to Winston [Churchill, the First Lord of the Admiralty] pleading with him to bomb, torpedo or capture the Bremen [a German ocean liner], but on the phone this morning he was positively exultant about the alleged German seizure of Poland, which he called "the quickest thing on record". He is still englamoured of Hitler and cannot believe that a nation which has not employed R. or Esmond in its counsels can possibly be in any way prepared". Brooks, who supported the war effort often wrote with disgust in his diary about Rothermere's barely veiled admiration of Hitler and his equally ill-concealed glee at the German victories of 1939–1940.

Rothermere's pro-Nazi views made him extremely unpopular after war had been declared, and in the winter of 1939–1940 he left Britain, never to return. Beaverbrook, as Minister of Aircraft Production, arranged for Rothermere to be given the task of inspecting the aircraft industry of Canada and the United States, but this was a merely a sop to his ego. Adding to his unpopularity was that Hohenlohe in an act of spite introduced as evidence in the lawsuit in the fall of 1939 several of Rothermere's pro-Nazi letters to her. To defend his reputation, Rothermere had Brooks and Ward-Price ghost-write a book Warnings and Predications defending his views on Hungary and Germany. Aware of his unpopularity, Rothermere was a deeply depressed man in his last days. His grandchildren, who met him in a hotel in Quebec City in May 1940, recalled that Rothermere had told them that he was convinced that Nazi Germany was destined to win the war, and that he felt that Churchill who just became prime minister on 10 May 1940 was foolish in not seeking peace. Rothermere spent his last days attempting to retroactively erase his history of pro-Nazi views. To recover from stress, Rothermere went on holiday to Bermuda, where he died in unknown circumstances in November 1940.

== Family ==
Lord Rothermere married Lilian Share, daughter of George Wade Share, on 4 July 1893. They had three sons, the two elder of whom were killed in the First World War:

- Captain Harold Alfred Vyvyan St George Harmsworth MC (2 August 1894 – 12 February 1918), died of wounds, aged 23, after serving with the 2nd Bn. Irish Guards in France. A week after his death he was awarded the Military Cross. He is buried in Hampstead Cemetery.
- Lieutenant Vere Sidney Tudor Harmsworth (25 September 1895 – 13 November 1916), killed in action during the first day of the Battle of the Ancre, aged 21, while serving with the Hawke Bn. 63rd (Royal Naval) Division, Royal Naval Reserve. He is buried in the Ancre British Cemetery at Beaumont-Hamel on the Somme.
- Esmond Harmsworth, 2nd Viscount Rothermere (29 May 1898 – 12 July 1978)

Viscountess Rothermere, as she had become, died on 16 March 1937.

== In fiction ==
A fictional version of Lord Rothermere appears in Dennis Wheatley's 1934 novel Black August about an attempted Communist takeover of Britain, under the name of "Lord Badgerlake" (mere is another word for lake). Badgerlake supports a paramilitary force called the "Greyshirts", which backs the government during the uprising. Any connection with Fascism is disclaimed, and the novel does not end with a dictatorship. (In fact, the new Government repeals the 1914 Defence of the Realm Act in order to guarantee the liberty of the subject.)

== Bibliography ==
- Rothermere, Harold S. H., Warnings and Predictions, Eyre & Spottiswoode Ltd., 1939
- Viscount Rothermere, My Fight to Rearm Britain, London: Eyre & Spottiswoode Ltd., 1939

== Sources ==
- Addison, Paul (1975). "Patriotism under pressure: Lord Rothermere and British Foreign Policy". In Gillian Peele; Chris Cook (eds.). The Politics of Reappraisal 1918–1939. London: Macmillian. pp. 189–208. ISBN 9781349022427.
- Ball, Stuart (2013). Portrait of a Party :The Conservative Party in Britain 1918-1945. Oxford: Oxford University Press. ISBN 9780199667987.
- Bán, András D. (2004). Hungarian-British Diplomacy, 1938-1941: The Attempt to Maintain Relations. London: Frank Cass. ISBN 9780714685656.
- Bennett, Gill (2018). The Zinoviev Letter The Conspiracy that Never Dies. Oxford: Oxford University Press. ISBN 9780191080098.
- Brooks, Collin (1998). Fleet Street, Press Barons and Politics The Journals of Collin Brooks, 1932-1940. Cambridge: Cambridge University Press. ISBN 9780521662390.
- Becker, Andreas (2021). Britain and Danubian Europe in the Era of World War II, 1933-1941. New York: Springer International Publishing. ISBN 9783030675103.
- Bourne, Richard (1990). Lords of Fleet Street: The Harmsworth Dynasty. London: Taylor & Francis. ISBN 9781317403883.
- Close, Upton; Washington Hall, Josef (1935). Behind the Face of Japan ... New York: D. Appleton-Century Company.
- Crozier, Andrew J. (1988). Appeasement and Germany's Last Bid for Colonies. London: Macmillan. ISBN 9780333447635.
- Dack, Janet (2010). "'It certainly wasn't cricket!': Media responses to Mosely and the BUF". In Nigel Copsey; A. J. Olechnowicz (eds.). Varieties of Anti-Fascism Britain in the Inter-War Period. London: Macmillan. pp. 140–161. ISBN 9780230282674.
- Greenwall, Harry James (1938). Pacific Scene. London: Nicholson.
- Griffiths, Richard (1980). Fellow Travellers of the Right: British Enthusiasts for Nazi Germany, 1933-1939. London: Faber and Faber. ISBN 0571271324.
- Hanson, Philip (2008). This Side of Despair: How the Movies and American Life Intersected During the Great Depression. Madison: Fairleigh Dickinson University Press. ISBN 9780838641293.
- Knüsel, Ariane (2016). Framing China Media Images and Political Debates in Britain, the USA and Switzerland, 1900-1950. London: Taylor & Francis. ISBN 9781317133605.
- Lendvai, Paul (2004). The Hungarians A Thousand Years of Victory in Defeat. Princeton: Princeton University Press. ISBN 9780691200286.
- Malik, Malti (2010). The History of India. New Delhi: New Saraswati House Pvt Ltd. ISBN 978-8173354984.
- Neary, Peter (1988). Newfoundland in the North Atlantic World, 1929-1949. Montreal: McGill-Queen's University Press. ISBN 9780773561809.
- Olmsted, Kathryn (2022). The Newspaper Axis: Six Press Barons Who Enabled Hitler. New Haven: Yale University Press. ISBN 978-0300256420.
- Orzoff, Andrea (2009). Battle for the Castle The Myth of Czechoslovakia in Europe, 1914-1948. Oxford: Oxford University Press. ISBN 9780199709953.
- Pearce, Malcolm; Stewart, Geoffrey (2013). British Political History, 1867–2001 Democracy and Decline. London: Taylor & Francis. ISBN 9781136453533.
- Pugh, Martin (2013). Hurrah For The Blackshirts! Fascists and Fascism in Britain Between the Wars. New York: Random House. ISBN 9781448162871.
- Renner, Stephen (2016). Broken Wings The Hungarian Air Force, 1918-45. Bloomington: Indiana University Press. ISBN 9780253023391.
- Reid Gannon, Franklin (1971). The British Press and Germany, 1936-1939. Oxford: Clarendon Press. ISBN 9780198214908.
- Samuel, Raphael (1989). "The 'Little Platoons'". Routledge Revivals: History Workshop Series. London: Taylor & Francis. pp. xi–xxxix. ISBN 9781315442518.
- Simpson, John (2010). Unreliable Sources How The Twentieth Century Was Reported. London: Macmillan Palgrave. ISBN 978-1405050050.
- Simpson, John (2016). We Chose To Speak Of War & Strife. London: Bloomsbury Publishing. ISBN 978-1408872246.
- Taylor, Miles (2018). Empress Queen Victoria and India. New Haven: Yale University Press. ISBN 9780300118094.
- Thomas, Nigel; Szabo, Laszlo (2012). The Royal Hungarian Army in World War II. 2012: Osprey. ISBN 9781846037955.
- Urbach, Karina (2015). Go-Betweens for Hitler. Oxford: Oxford University Press. ISBN 9780191008672.
- Williamson, Philip (2003). National Crisis and National Government British Politics, the Economy and Empire, 1926-1932. Cambridge: Cambridge University Press. ISBN 9780521521413.
- Wilson, Jim (2011). Nazi Princess Hitler, Lord Rothermere and Princess Stephanie Von Hohenlohe. Cheltenham: History Press. ISBN 9780752466743.

Political offices
Preceded by The Viscount Cowdray as President of the Air Board	President of the Air Council; 1917–1918	Succeeded by The Lord Weir
Peerage of the United Kingdom
New creation	Viscount Rothermere; 1919–1940	Succeeded by Esmond Harmsworth
New creation	Baron Rothermere; 1914–1940; Member of the House of Lords (1914–1940)	Succeeded by Esmond Harmsworth
Baronetage of the United Kingdom
New creation	Baronet of Horsey; 1910–1940	Succeeded by Esmond Harmsworth
