= Harmsworth (surname) =

Harmsworth is a surname, and may refer to:

- Alfred Harmsworth (barrister) (1837–1889), British lawyer
- Alfred Harmsworth, 1st Viscount Northcliffe (1865–1922), British newspaper and publishing magnate
- Cecil Harmsworth, 1st Baron Harmsworth (1869–1948), British businessman and Liberal politician
- Esmond Harmsworth, 2nd Viscount Rothermere (1898–1978), British Conservative politician and press magnate
- Fred Harmsworth (1877–after 1903), English footballer
- Harold Harmsworth, 1st Viscount Rothermere (1868–1940), British newspaper proprietor
- Sir Hildebrand Harmsworth, 1st Baronet (1872–1929), British newspaper proprietor
- Sir Hildebrand Harmsworth, 2nd Baronet (1901–1977), rentier
- Jonathan Harmsworth, 4th Viscount Rothermere (born 1967), British media man
- Leicester Harmsworth (1870–1937), British businessman and Liberal politician
- Mark Harmsworth, American politician
- Mary Harmsworth, Viscountess Northcliffe (1867–1963)
- Patricia Harmsworth, Viscountess Rothermere (1929–1992), English socialite and actress
- Paul Harmsworth (born 1963), British sprinter
- St John Harmsworth (1876–1933), English businessman
- Vere Harmsworth, 3rd Viscount Rothermere (1925–1998), British newspaper man

== See also ==
- Harmsworth (disambiguation)
