= Viscount Rothermere =

Viscountcy in the Peerage of the United Kingdom

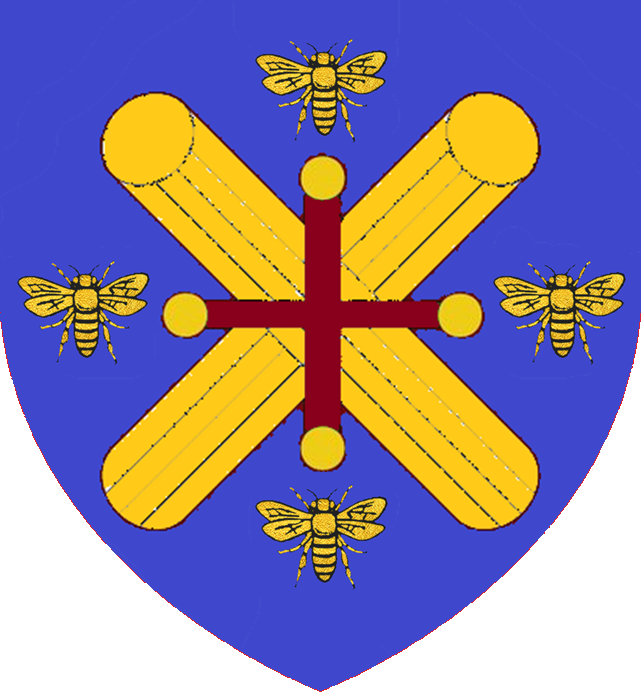
- Arms of the 4th Viscount
- Creation date: 1919
- Created by: George V
- Peerage: Peerage of the United Kingdom
- First holder: Harold Harmsworth, 1st Baron Harmsworth
- Present holder: Jonathan Harmsworth, 4th Viscount Rothermere
- Heir apparent: Vere Richard Jonathan Harold Harmsworth
- Subsidiary titles: Baron Rothermere
- Seat: Ferne House
- Motto: Bene Qui Sedulo (He who acts diligently acts well)

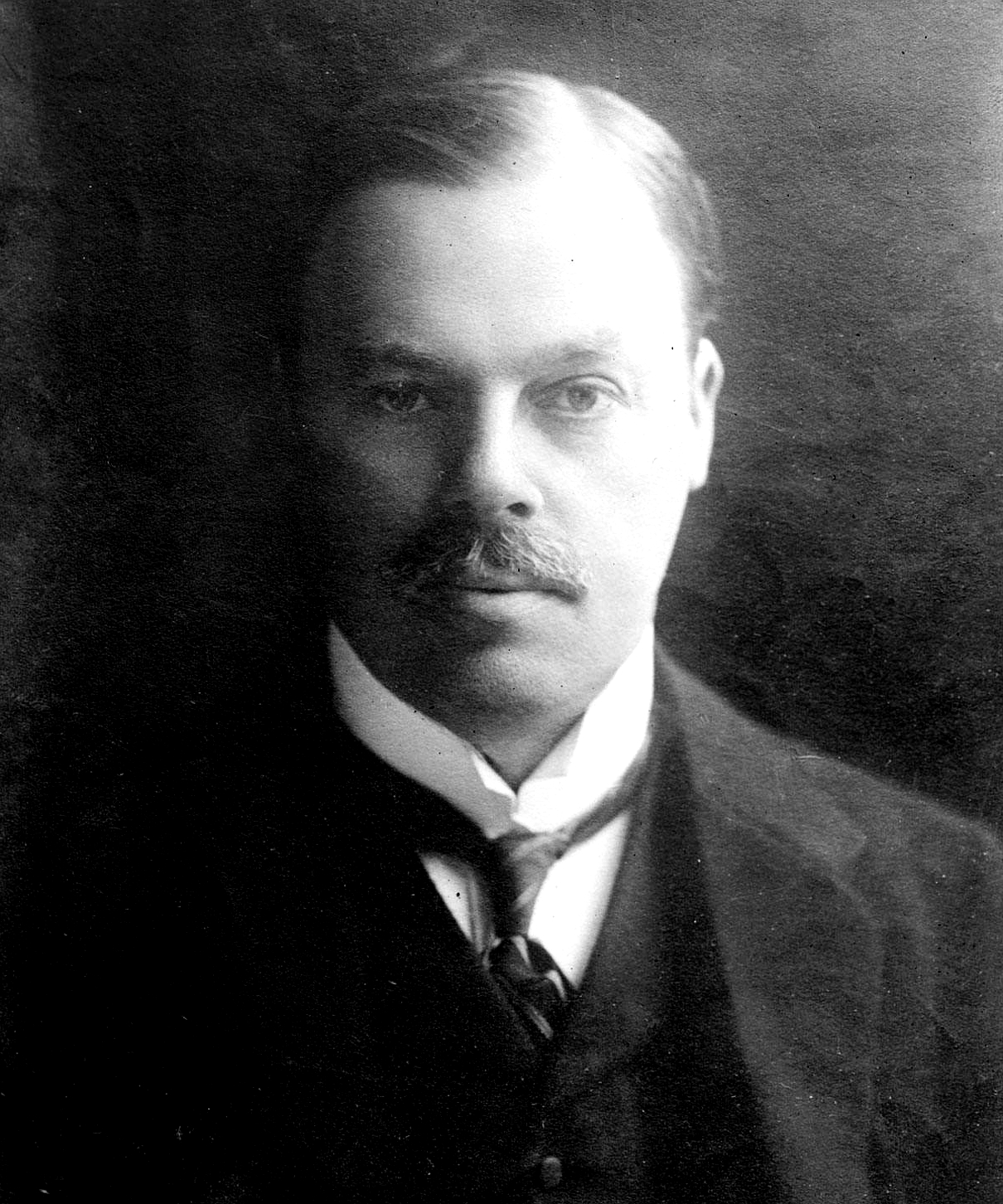
Harold Harmsworth, 1st Viscount Rothermere

Viscount Rothermere, of Hemsted in the county of Kent, is a title in the Peerage of the United Kingdom. It was created in 1919 for the press lord Harold Harmsworth, 1st Baron Harmsworth. He had already been created a baronet, of Horsey in the County of Norfolk, on 14 July 1910, and Baron Rothermere, of Hemsted in the County of Kent, in 1914. Every holder of the titles has served as chairman of Daily Mail and General Trust plc, a major global media conglomerate privately owned by the Rothermere. As of 2022 the titles are held by the first Viscount's great-grandson, the fourth Viscount, who succeeded his father in 1998.

The first Viscount Rothermere was the younger brother of Alfred Harmsworth, 1st Viscount Northcliffe, and the elder brother of Cecil Harmsworth, 1st Baron Harmsworth, Sir Leicester Harmsworth, 1st Baronet, and Sir Hildebrand Harmsworth, 1st Baronet.

The family seat is Ferne House, near Donhead St Andrew, Wiltshire.

== Harmsworth baronets (1910) ==
- Harold Sidney Harmsworth, 1st Baronet (1868–1940) (created Baron Rothermere in 1914)

=== Baron Rothermere (1914) ===
- Harold Sidney Harmsworth, 1st Baron Rothermere (1868–1940) (created Viscount Rothermere in 1919)

=== Viscount Rothermere (1919) ===
- Harold Sidney Harmsworth, 1st Viscount Rothermere (1868–1940))
  - Hon. Harold Alfred Vyvyan St George Harmsworth (1894–1918)
- Esmond Cecil Harmsworth, 2nd Viscount Rothermere (1898–1978)
- Vere Harold Esmond Harmsworth, 3rd Viscount Rothermere (1925–1998)
- (Harold) Jonathan Esmond Vere Harmsworth, 4th Viscount Rothermere (born 1967)

The heir apparent is the present holder's son, the Hon. Vere Richard Jonathan Harold Harmsworth (born 1994).

== Line of succession ==
- Harold Sidney Harmsworth, 1st Viscount Rothermere (1868–1940)
  - Esmond Cecil Harmsworth, 2nd Viscount Rothermere (1898–1978)
    - Vere Harold Esmond Harmsworth, 3rd Viscount Rothermere (1925–1998)
      - (Harold) Jonathan Esmond Vere Harmsworth, 4th Viscount Rothermere (born 1967)
        - (1) Hon. Vere Richard Jonathan Harold Harmsworth (born 1994)
        - (2) Hon. Alfred Northcliffe St. John Harmsworth (born 2010)

== See also ==
- Viscount Northcliffe
- Baron Harmsworth
- Harmsworth baronets, of Moray Lodge, and Harmsworth baronets, of Freshwater Grove
- Rothermere American Institute at University of Oxford

Baronetage of the United Kingdom
Preceded by Champneys baronets	Harmsworth baronets of Horsey; 14 July 1910	Succeeded by Jones baronets
