= Graham Cox =

Graham Cox may refer to:

- Graham Cox (judge) (1933–2014), Scottish judge
- Graham Cox (footballer, born 1959) (1959–2024), football goalkeeper
- Graham Cox (Australian footballer) (1933–1973), Australian rules footballer
