= Harmsworth =

Harmsworth may refer to:

== People ==
- Harmsworth (surname)
- Titles of the Harmsworth family of newspaper proprietors:
  - Viscount Northcliffe
  - Viscount Rothermere
  - Baron Harmsworth

== Other uses ==
- Harmsworth Cup, a trophy for motorboat racing
- Vere Harmsworth Library, a research library for U.S. studies at the Rothermere American Institute, University of Oxford
- Coram's Fields, officially named "Coram's Fields and the Harmsworth Memorial Playground"
- Harmsworth Popular Science, a magazine published in the early 20th century
- Harmsworth Self-Educator, a British educational magazine series published between 1905 and 1907
- A. Harmsworth Glacier, N Greenland
