= Harmsworth baronets =

Baronetcy in the Baronetage of the United Kingdom

There have been four baronetcies created for members of the Harmsworth family, all in the Baronetage of the United Kingdom. All recipients were brothers.

The Harmsworth baronetcy, of Elmwood, in the parish of St Peter's, Thanet, in the County of Kent, was created in the Baronetage of the United Kingdom on 23 August 1904 for the press lord Alfred Harmsworth. He was later created Viscount Northcliffe, with which title the baronetcy merged and became extinct on his death in 1922.

The Harmsworth baronetcy, of Horsey in the County of Norfolk, was created in the Baronetage of the United Kingdom on 14 July 1910 for the press lord Harold Harmsworth. He was later created Viscount Rothermere, with which title the baronetcy remains merged.

The Harmsworth baronetcy, of Moray Lodge in the Royal Borough of Kensington, was created in the Baronetage of the United Kingdom on 1 July 1918 for Leicester Harmsworth. He represented Caithness and Caithness and Sutherland in the House of Commons as a Liberal. The title became extinct in 1980 on the death of his younger son, Arthur Geoffrey Annesley Harmsworth, the third Baronet.

The Harmsworth baronetcy, of Freshwater Grove in the parish of Shipley in the County of Sussex, was created in the Baronetage of the United Kingdom on 21 June 1922 for the newspaper owner Hildebrand Harmsworth. He was the proprietor of The Globe. As of 25 February 2020 the title is held by the grandson of the first Baronet, the third Baronet, who succeeded his father in 1977.

Another brother, Cecil Harmsworth, was created Baron Harmsworth in 1939.

== Harmsworth baronets, of Elmwood (1904) ==
- Sir Alfred Harmsworth, 1st Baronet (1865–1922) (created Viscount Northcliffe in 1905; both titles extinct upon his death in 1922)

== Harmsworth baronets, of Horsey (1910) ==
- see Viscount Rothermere

== Harmsworth baronets, of Moray Lodge (1918) ==
- Sir (Robert) Leicester Harmsworth, 1st Baronet (1870–1937)
- Sir Alfred Leicester St Barbe Harmsworth, 2nd Baronet (1892–1962)
- Sir Arthur Geoffrey Annesley Harmsworth, 3rd Baronet (1904–1980)

== Harmsworth baronets, of Freshwater Grove (1922) ==
- Sir Hildebrand Aubrey Harmsworth, 1st Baronet (1872–1929)
- Sir Hildebrand Alfred Beresford Harmsworth, 2nd Baronet (1901–1977)
- Sir Hildebrand Harold Harmsworth, 3rd Baronet (1931–2026)
- Sir Hildebrand Esmond Miles Harmsworth, 4th Baronet (born 1964)

The heir apparent is the present holder's son, Hildebrand Darcy Laurence Harmsworth (born 1994).

== See also ==
- Baron Harmsworth
