= The Sylvans =

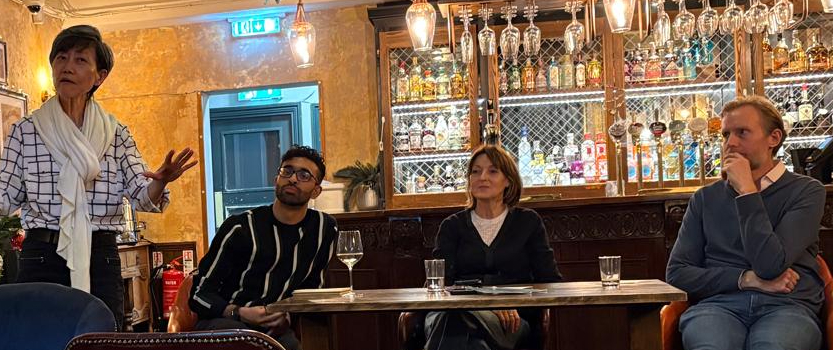
The Sylvans during a debate: a floor speaker shares her view while the main speakers and chair listen.

The Sylvans are a free speech group open to the public which discusses topical issues. They meet twice monthly and employ a motion-based debating format.

The group is a diverse set of people who meet in a central London pub, Ye Olde Cock Tavern. With a wide range of backgrounds and perspectives, the debates cover topics in-depth in a friendly atmosphere of mutual respect. Through this the Sylvans take a fresh view on the important issues, always incorporating a wide range of perspectives, with speeches from the audience making up two-thirds of the debates. This contrasts with other debating groups, that often have experienced, pre-prepared speakers making up the majority of the discussion. The Sylvans' approach of taking as wide a possible range of input always generates a deeper understanding of the topic: crowd wisdom, not echo chamber.

== Activities ==
The subject of the club's now twice-monthly debates typically relates to key topical issues of public and political life. Recent subjects have included the Mayor of London, minority rights, the economy, the NHS, the UK and US elections, the role of women in government, the war in Ukraine and many others. These reflect the interests of the highly diverse audiences of the Sylvans in London, where everyone can participate, with or without prior public speaking experience.

The debate is focused on a particular motion, with a chairperson who introduces the speakers and directs the meeting generally. The motion is proposed by the Proposer and opposed by the Opposer, following which all present are invited to contribute if they wish, which are called "floor speeches". The floor speeches typically make up two-thirds of the debate, ensuring a very wide range of perspectives inform the outcome. Audience members have no obligation to speak, and are welcome to observe, while the Sylvans have first-time public speakers at all meetings, with no experience required.

Following rebuttals by the Proposer and the Opposer, the debate concludes with a vote of all attendees, and the motion either won or lost. Participants are invited to play a role in selecting the motions to be debated, and to put themselves forward for the position of Proposer or Opposer.

The Sylvans meet on the first and third Mondays of the month in Ye Olde Cock Tavern, in the second floor gin bar. The only exception to this is when one or both of the Mondays falls on a bank holiday, in which case the meetings are delayed by a week.

The first Monday of the month we hold the main Sylvan debate, an in-depth, two-hour debate on a meaty topic. On the third Monday, we hold our short debates. That meeting includes two one-hour debates on unique topics that are voted for by the audience at the beginning of the night, whittling down from a list of five to two motions. At the end of the short debates meeting, we also do rapid-fire impromptu topics of a light or humorous nature, one minute each. Impromptu debating represents one of the most challenging form of public speaking, and a great way to learn to think on your feet!

The Sylvans also hold an annual dinner debate on a lighthearted topic. The dinner debate in 2025 was on the motion:

We would rather live in 2125 than 2025.

== How Sylvan debates generate wisdom from wide audience participation ==
A distinctive feature of the Sylvans is their practice of integrating audience participation into its debates. Unlike some debating societies that rely mainly on a small number of experienced, pre-prepared speakers, the Sylvans devote around two-thirds of each session to contributions from attendees. This format is intended to broaden the range of perspectives, sharpen arguments and allow for collective reflection.

The dinner debate from 2025 referenced above, entitled Living in 2125 illustrates this model. The motion asked whether participants would prefer life in the year 2125 to that of 2025, exploring scenarios of advanced artificial intelligence, robotics (including "sex bots"!), algorithmic relationships, biometric health monitoring and highly automated societies.

The opening speakers presented contrasting positions: the proposer described a future of peace, convenience and technological progress, while the opposer warned of excessive control, diminished human spontaneity and the potential sterility of a fully automated existence.

Following these speeches, the majority of contributions came from the audience. Members questioned assumptions about the desirability of artificial companions, the ethics of outsourcing intimacy to machines and the economic consequences of extreme automation. These interventions expanded the scope of the discussion beyond the initial binary of utopia versus dystopia. Audience contributions also moderated some of the more extreme claims, producing a more nuanced collective assessment.

The debate concluded with a vote in which the motion did not carry, indicating a preference for remaining in 2025 rather than embracing the imagined world of 2125.

Commentators within the club have described this outcome as a classic example of the impact of a Sylvan debate: wisdom emerges through the interplay of multiple voices, rather than through the victory of a single argument.

== History ==
The Sylvan Debating Club was founded in 1868. More specifically, the inception of the club was discussed on top of one of the Green Atlas buses, which ran from the City of London through Baker Street and the Abbey Road to the Princess of Wales Hotel in St. John's Wood. A conversation took place between Alfred Harmsworth and one of the other founders and resulted in the first meeting being held on 6 January 1868.

The club, particularly in its early years, included a number of prominent members. This was partly driven by the Harmsworth family, who owned several leading newspapers. Ultimately three of Alfred Harmsworth's sons were raised to the peerage, all of whom became members of the club. Their associates and those of the other founders ensured that the club enjoyed the presence of illustrious members of British society well into the early decades of the twentieth century.

Operating in such a milieu meant that the activities of the Sylvans were reflected in major British newspaper reports at the time, particularly in coverage of the club's annual dinner, which was something of a set-piece event. In 1901, the Duke of Norfolk was the principal guest. In 1906, Charles Darling, a judge and future Privy Council member, was a guest. Lord Carson, a former cabinet member and leader of the opposition in the government of the United Kingdom, was the principal guest at the dinner in 1927.

Over the years the Sylvans discussed topics such as the probity of the British press, the clarity of language used in British legal courts, the past and future of the club itself, the relationship between members of Parliament and newspaper editors, the oratory style of the House of Commons, the merits of public schools, vegetarianism and whether bachelors should be taxed among many others.

While it is ironically debatable whether such clubs had any impact whatsoever on the course of history, there are some statements recorded in the newspaper reports providing relevant indications. During his speech at the 1901 Sylvan dinner, the Duke of Norfolk commented, according to the London Evening Standard, that "he thought that such clubs as the Sylvan Debating Club really did an important part in carrying on the public life of England, and the writing of the history of the great nation to which they belonged."

The club continued its activities through both the First and Second World Wars, though the frequency of meetings reduced significantly, according to minute books recorded by the club's secretary. The customary schedule had been weekly debates October through to April, with breaks over Christmas and Easter, with a program of topics announced in advance via printed cards.

Membership in debating societies in London in general waxed and waned due to various factors, post an initial flourishing in the mid eighteenth century. By the mid twentieth century, few of these original clubs were still in existence. Those that were experienced a general decline in membership, in particular when major newspapers closed their Fleet Street offices through the 1970s and 80s. The Sylvans continued uninterrupted during this period, though membership declined to a low point in the early 2000s, which has since been reversed.

== Notable members ==
- Alfred Harmsworth
- Viscount Northcliffe
- Viscount Rothermere
- Lord Cecil Harmsworth
- Sir Leicester Harmsworth, Bart.
- Sir Hildebrand Harmsworth, Bart
- St John Harmsworth
- Sir George Edward Dunstan Sherston Baker, Bart.
- Augustine Birrell
- John Seymour Lucas
- Daniel Grant
- Harwood Panting
- Kennedy Jones
- Baron Molloy
- Peter Hulme-Cross

== See also ==
- Society of Cogers
