= New Liberal Review =

The New Liberal Review was a short-lived British, monthly periodical published from 1901 to 1904 in London. The New Liberal Review was founded by brothers Cecil and Hildebrand Harmsworth. Their stated goals were "to reflect the best Liberal thought of the day, and to endeavour to bring the Liberalism of the Mother Country in touch with that of the colonies." Editorial policy supported the Liberal Party, and in particular, the leading Unionist politician, Joseph Chamberlain. It has been characterised as a "Liberal Imperialist magazine."
