= Ye Olde Cock Tavern =

Pub in London, England

Coordinates: 51°30′49.5″N 0°06′38″W

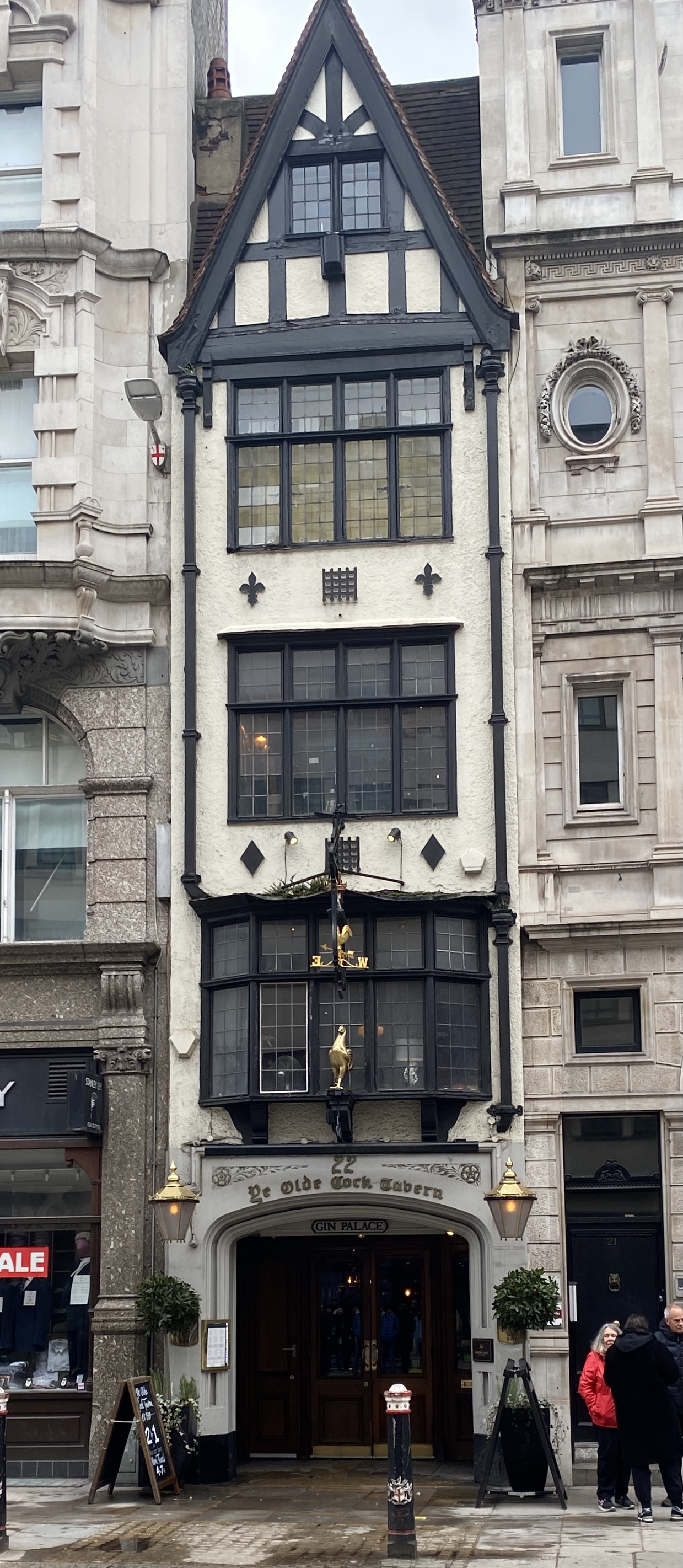
- The pub in 2023

General information
- Type: Public house
- Location: 22 Fleet Street, Temple, EC4Y 1AA, City of London, England

Design and construction
- Designations

Listed Building – Grade II
- Official name: Ye Olde Cock Tavern
- Designated: 10 November 1977
- Reference no.: 1192621

Website
- Official website

Ye Olde Cock Tavern is a Grade II listed public house at 22 Fleet Street, London EC4. It is part of the Greene King group.

Originally built before the 17th century, it was rebuilt, including the interior (which is thought to include work by carver Grinling Gibbons), on the other side of the road in the 1880s when a branch of the Bank of England was built where it stood. Shortly before the destruction in 1886, the dining room was captured in a lithograph by Philip Norman.

However, in the 1990s a fire broke out and destroyed many of the original ornaments, and the building has since gone through a restoration using photographs.

In 1930 the founding meeting of the Society of Industrial Artists, later renamed Society of Industrial Artists and Designers and now the Chartered Society of Designers, was held at the Olde Cock Tavern, and attendees included Sir Misha Black and Milner Gray.

It was frequented by Samuel Pepys, Alfred Tennyson and Charles Dickens.

The Olde Cocke has also become the meeting place for the world's oldest free speech society, or debating club, Cogers, on each second Monday of the month. In addition, the Sylvan Debating Club meets there on the first Monday of the month and Debate London meets here on the second and fourth Tuesdays of the month with community-focused socials taking place on any month with a fifth Tuesday.

== Gallery ==
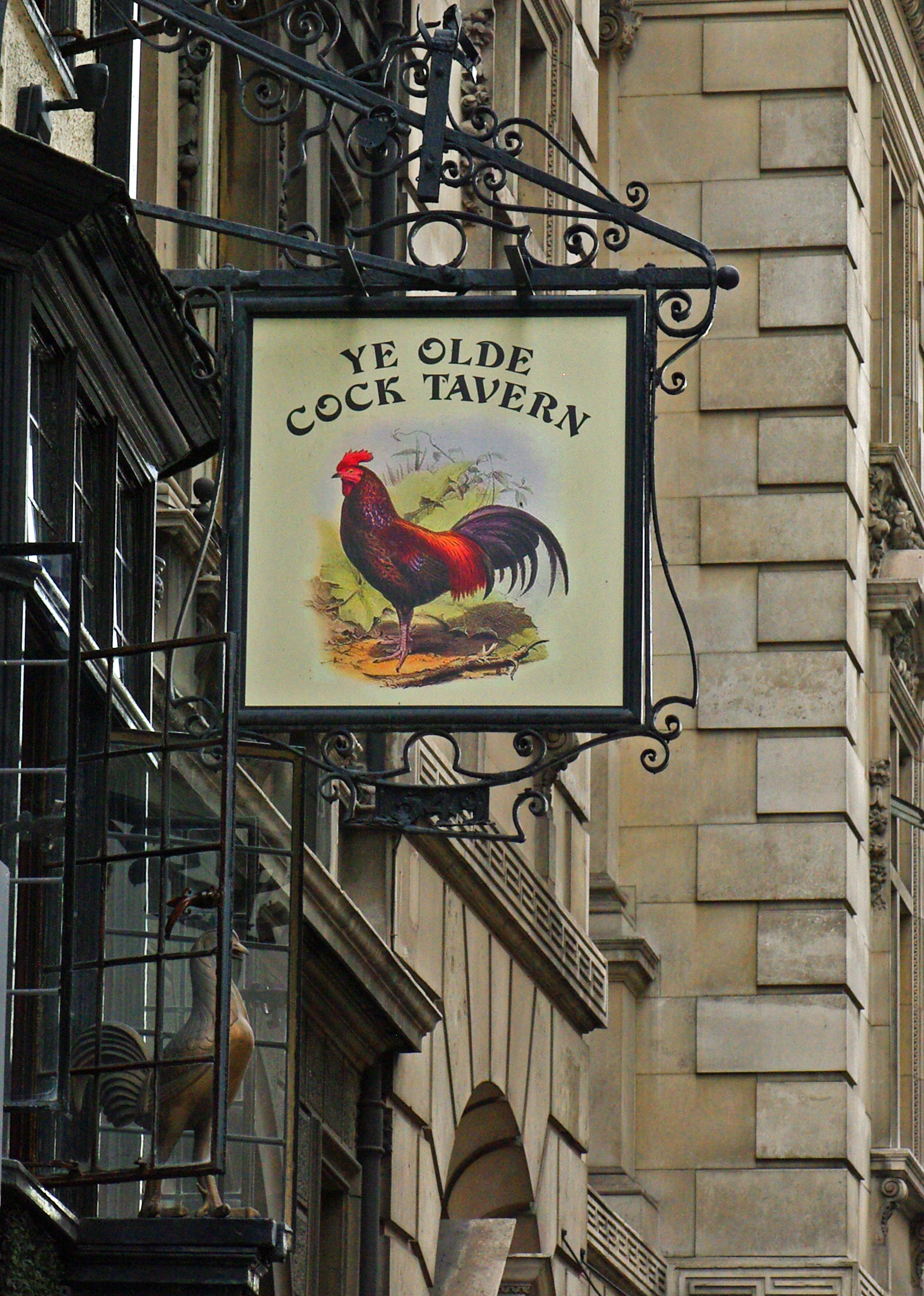
Pub sign

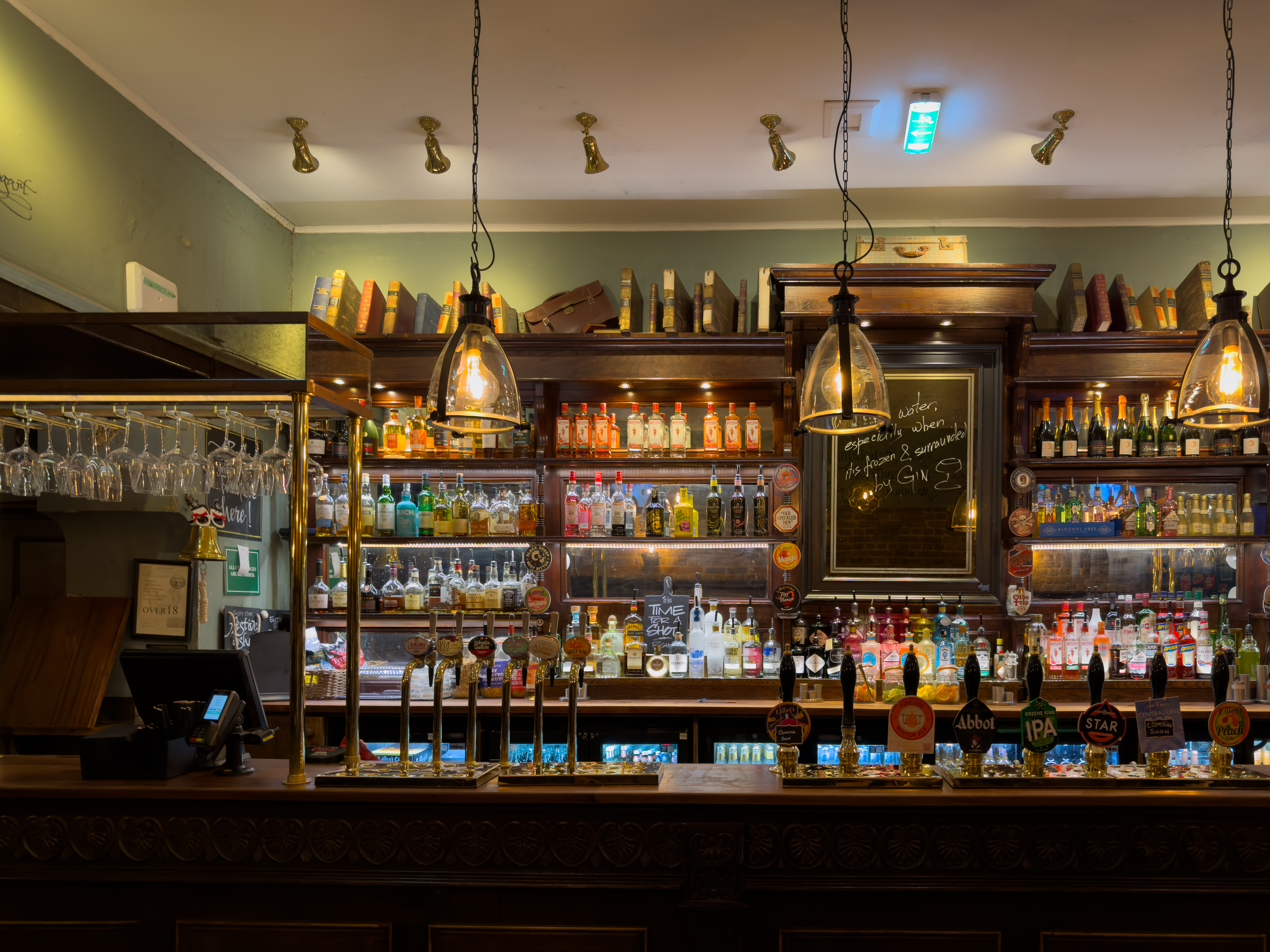
The bar inside the pub in 2026

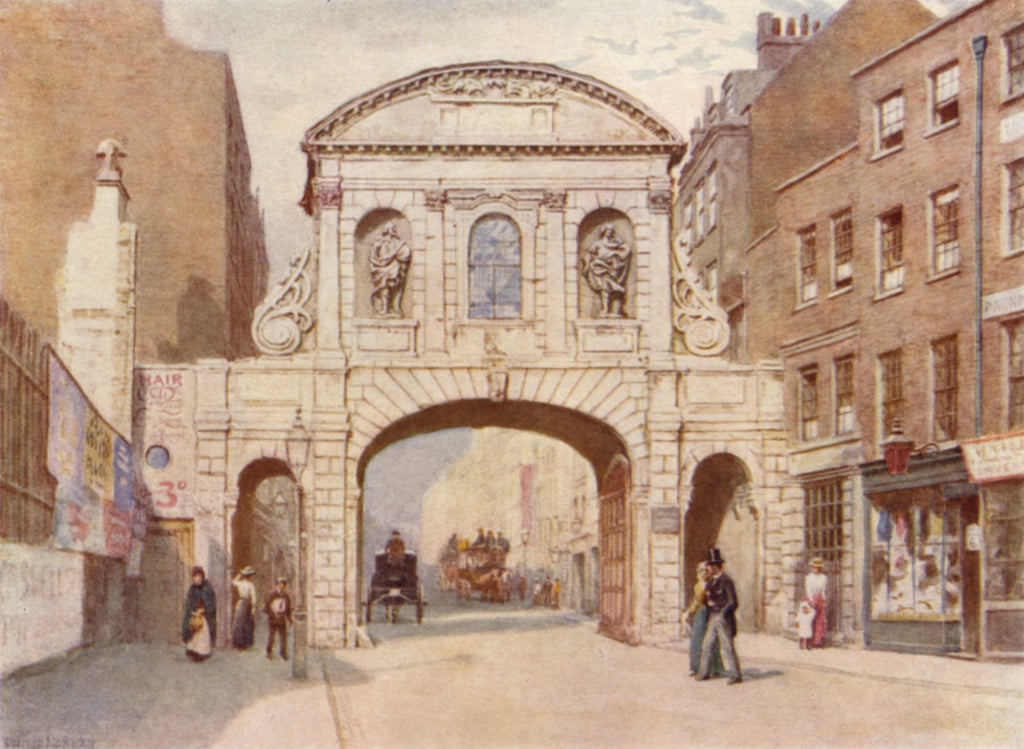
Temple Bar (1876), very close to Ye Olde Cock Tavern by Philip Norman

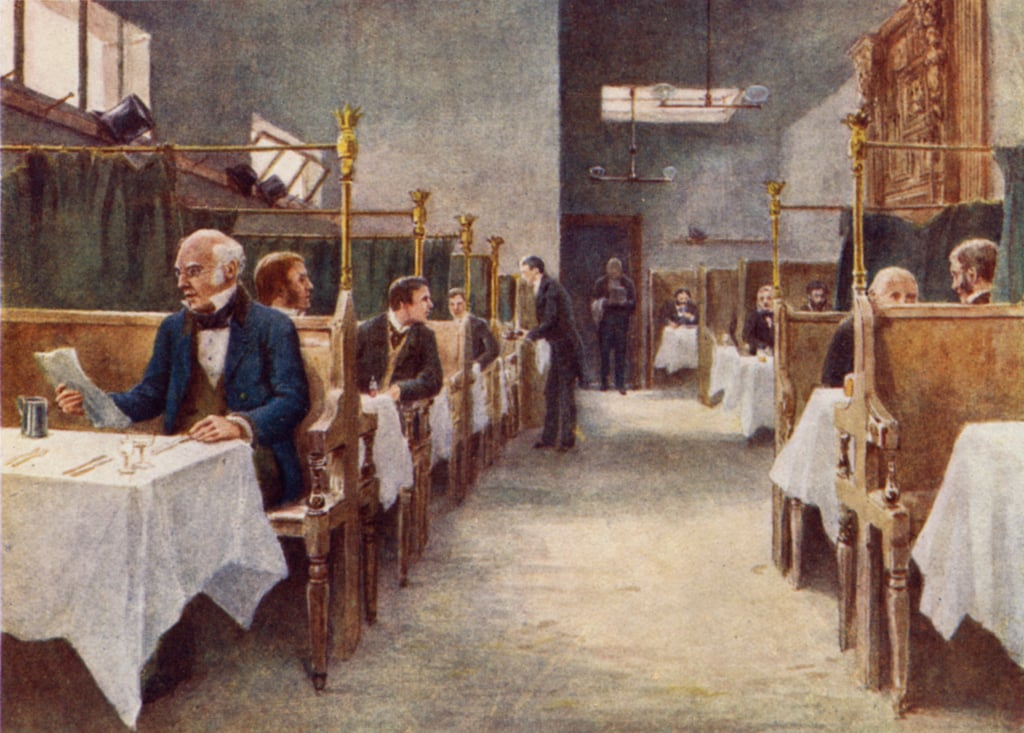
Dining-room of Cock Tavern, Fleet Street (1886) by Philip Norman
