= John Stuart Mowat =

John Stuart Mowat (30 January 1923 – 31 October 2001), was a Scottish Sheriff and Liberal Party politician.

== Background ==
He was the son of George Mowat and Annie Barlow. He was educated at Glasgow High School, Belmont House School, Merchiston Castle School and Glasgow University where he received a Master of Arts. In 1956 he married Anne Cameron Renfrew. They had two sons and two daughters.

== Early career ==
From 1941-46 he served in the Royal Air Force Transport Command. In 1944 he was promoted to Flight lieutenant. In 1947 he took up journalism. He was a sub-editor on a Scottish national daily and Sunday newspaper. He qualified as a barrister and in 1952 he became an Advocate, practising in Edinburgh.

== Political career ==
He joined the Liberal Party and in 1953 was elected to the Scottish Liberal Party executive. He was Liberal candidate for the Caithness and Sutherland division at the 1955 General Election. The constituency had been represented by the former Liberal Party Leader Sir Archibald Sinclair until 1945. Mowat was given the challenge of winning it back. His task was made difficult due to the fact that at the 1951 General Election, the Liberals had slipped to third. In a difficult year for the Liberals, he was unable to make any headway;

General Election 1955: Caithness and Sutherland
Party	Candidate	Votes	%	±%
Unionist	Sir David Robertson	10,453	56.5	+7.2
Labour	Hugh F Sutherland	5,364	29.0	−5.1
Liberal	John Stuart Mowat	2,674	14.5	−2.1
Majority		5,089	27.5	
Turnout		18,491	69.5	
Unionist hold		Swing	+6.1	

He did not stand for parliament again and devoted the rest of his career to his legal work.

== Senior legal career ==
In 1962 he was appointed a Sheriff in Dunfermline. In 1988 he was elected as president of the Sheriffs' Association. He became a Scottish Queen's Counsel. He was Sheriff Principal of South Strathclyde, Dumfries and Galloway from 1988–93. He presided over the fatal accident inquiry that reported in 1991, following the Lockerbie bombing.
