= Sheriff Principal of South Strathclyde, Dumfries and Galloway =

The Sheriff Principal of South Strathclyde, Dumfries and Galloway is the head of the judicial system of the sheriffdom of South Strathclyde, Dumfries and Galloway, one of the six sheriffdoms covering the whole of Scotland. The sheriffdom employs a number of legally qualified sheriffs who are responsible for the hearing of cases in five Sheriffs Court based in Airdrie, Ayr, Dumfries, Hamilton, Lanark and Stranraer. The current sheriffdoms were created in 1975 when the previous arrangement of 12 sheriffdoms was discontinued.

The Sheriff Principal, usually a King's Counsel (KC), is appointed by the monarch on the recommendation of the First Minister, who receives recommendations from the Judicial Appointments Board for Scotland. He or she must have been qualified as an advocate or solicitor for at least ten years and is responsible for the administrative oversight of the judicial system within the sheriffdom. The Sheriff Principal will also hear appeals against the judgement of his sheriffs, hear certain cases himself and occasionally conduct major fatal accident inquiries.

== Sheriffs Principal of South Strathclyde, Dumfries and Galloway ==
- 1975–: Robert Reid, QC, 1975–
- 1977–: Charles Hampton Johnston, QC
- 1988–1993: John Stuart Mowat
- 1993–2000: Graham Cox, QC
- 2000–2005: John Colin McInnes, QC
- 2005–2015: Brian A. Lockhart
- 2015– April 2020: Ian R. Abercrombie, QC
- April 2020 - 2023: Aisha Y. Anwar
- June 2023 - PRESENT : Catherine Dowdalls, KC

== See also ==
- Historical development of Scottish sheriffdoms
