= Baron Harmsworth =

Title in the Peerage of the United Kingdom

Barony Harmsworth
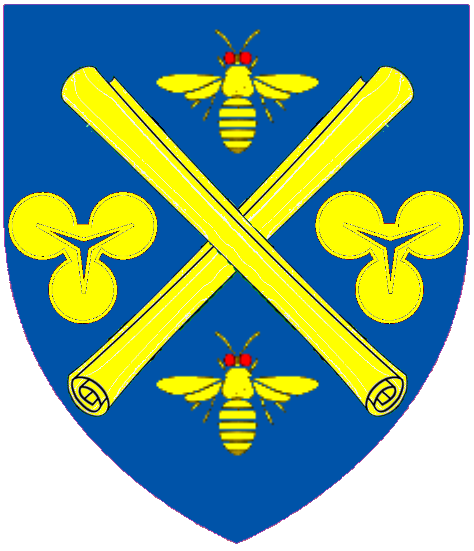
- Escutcheon: Azure two rolls of paper in saltire Or banded in the centre Gules between two bees volant in pale and as many trefoils in fess of the second. Crest: A cubit arm erect the hand holding a roll of paper fesswise Proper between two ostrich feathers Or. Supporters: On either side a deep-sea fisherman Proper.
- Creation date: 7 February 1939
- Created by: King George VI
- Peerage: Peerage of the United Kingdom
- First holder: Cecil Harmsworth
- Present holder: Thomas Harmsworth
- Heir apparent: Dominic Harmsworth
- Remainder to: the 1st baron's heirs male of the body lawfully begotten

Baron Harmsworth, of Egham in the County of Surrey, is a title in the Peerage of the United Kingdom. It was created in 1939 for the Liberal politician Cecil Harmsworth, Under-Secretary of State for Foreign Affairs between 1919 and 1922. As of 2017 the title is held by his grandson, the third Baron, who succeeded his uncle in 1990.

The first Baron Harmsworth was the younger brother of Alfred Harmsworth, 1st Viscount Northcliffe, and Harold Harmsworth, 1st Viscount Rothermere, and the elder brother of Sir Leicester Harmsworth, 1st Baronet, and Sir Hildebrand Harmsworth, 1st Baronet.

The family seat is The Old Rectory, near Stoke Abbott, Dorset.

== History ==
Rothermere had tried repeatedly to secure a title for his younger brother Cecil, finally succeeding in 1939, the year before he died. At the New Year Honours that year, Cecil Harmsworth received a barony 'for political and public services'. Taking the title of Baron Harmsworth of Egham, younger members of the family joked that he was the "Lord Ham of Egg". The first Baron Harmsworth enjoyed his title for nine years and died in 1948.

== Barons Harmsworth (1939) ==
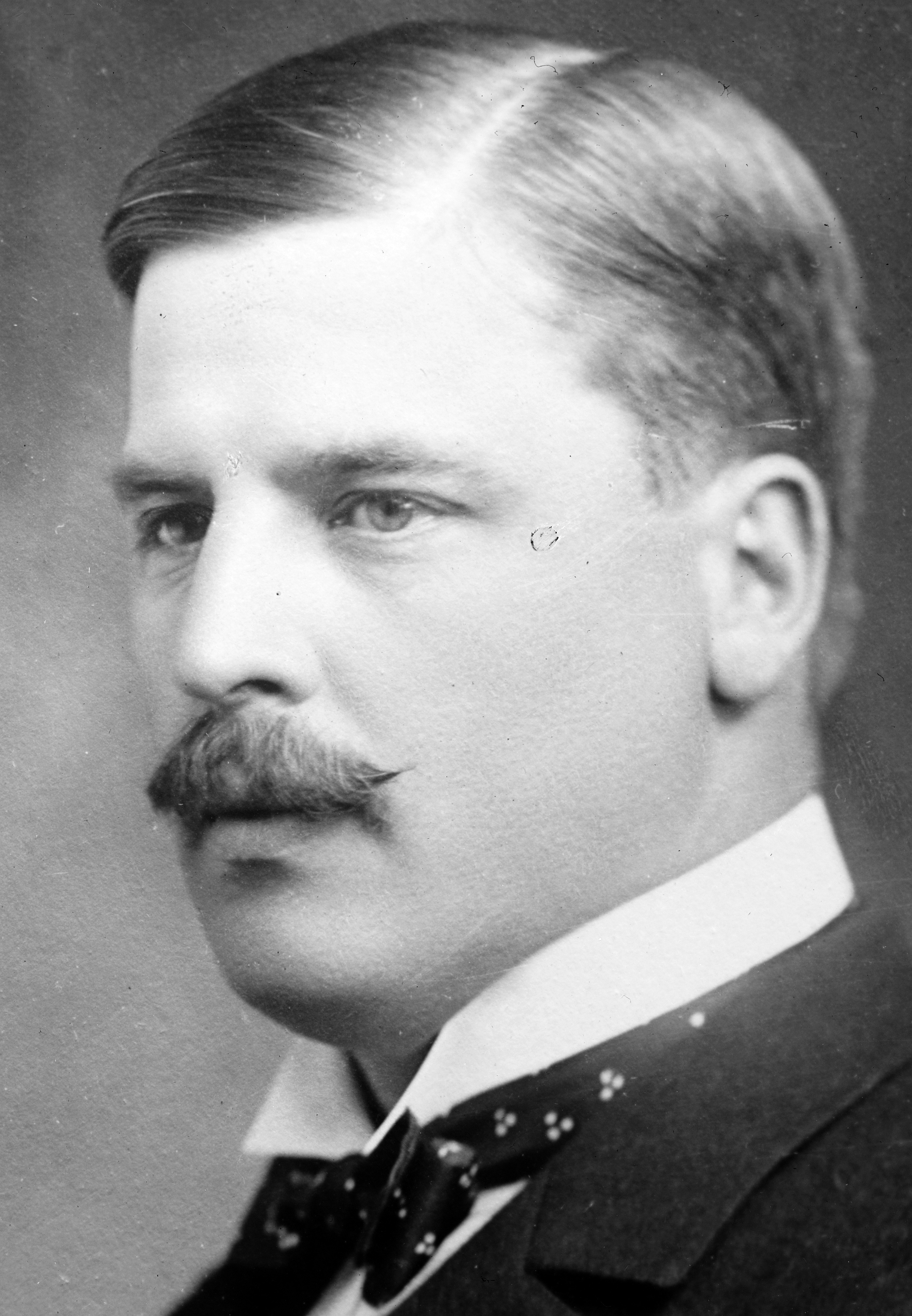
Cecil Harmsworth, 1st Baron Harmsworth

- Cecil Bisshopp Harmsworth, 1st Baron Harmsworth (1869–1948)
- Cecil Desmond Bernard Harmsworth, 2nd Baron Harmsworth (1903–1990)
- Thomas Harold Raymond Harmsworth, 3rd Baron Harmsworth (b. 1939)

The heir apparent is the present holder's son, the Hon. Dominic Michael Eric Harmsworth (b. 1973)
The heir apparent's heir apparent is his eldest son, Thomas John Mark Harmsworth (b. 2003)

=== Male-line family tree ===
Male-line family tree, Barons Harmsworth

Cecil Harmsworth; 1st Baron Harmsworth; 1869–1948
Cecil Harmsworth; 1898–1899	Cecil Harmsworth; 2nd Baron Harmsworth; 1903–1990	Hon. Eric Harmsworth; 1905–1988
Thomas Harmsworth; 3rd Baron Harmsworth born 1939
Hon. Dominic Harmsworth born 1973
Thomas Harmsworth born 2003

== See also ==
- Viscount Northcliffe
- Viscount Rothermere
- Harmsworth baronets, of Moray Lodge, and Harmsworth baronets, of Freshwater Grove

== Bibliography ==
- Kidd, Charles, Williamson, David (editors). Debrett's Peerage and Baronetage (1990 edition). New York: St Martin's Press, 1990,
- Leigh Rayment's Peerage Pages
