= London Debating Societies =

Debating societies emerged in London in the early eighteenth century, and were a prominent feature of society until the end of the century. The origins of the debating societies are not certain, but by the mid-18th century, London fostered an active debating culture. Topics ranged from current events and governmental policy, to love and marriage, and the societies welcomed participants from all genders and all social backgrounds, exemplifying the enlarged public sphere of the Age of Enlightenment.

At the end of the century, the political environment created by the French Revolution led to the tightening of governmental restrictions. The debating societies declined, and they virtually disappeared by the beginning of the nineteenth century. However, a select few societies survived to the present day, and new societies formed in recent years have been boosted by promotion via the internet and social media, giving debating in London a new lease on life.

Scholarship on London's debating societies is hindered by the lack of records left by the societies, but the work of historian Donna T. Andrew, among others, has contributed to the field.

== Debating Societies and the Enlightenment ==
See main article: Age of Enlightenment

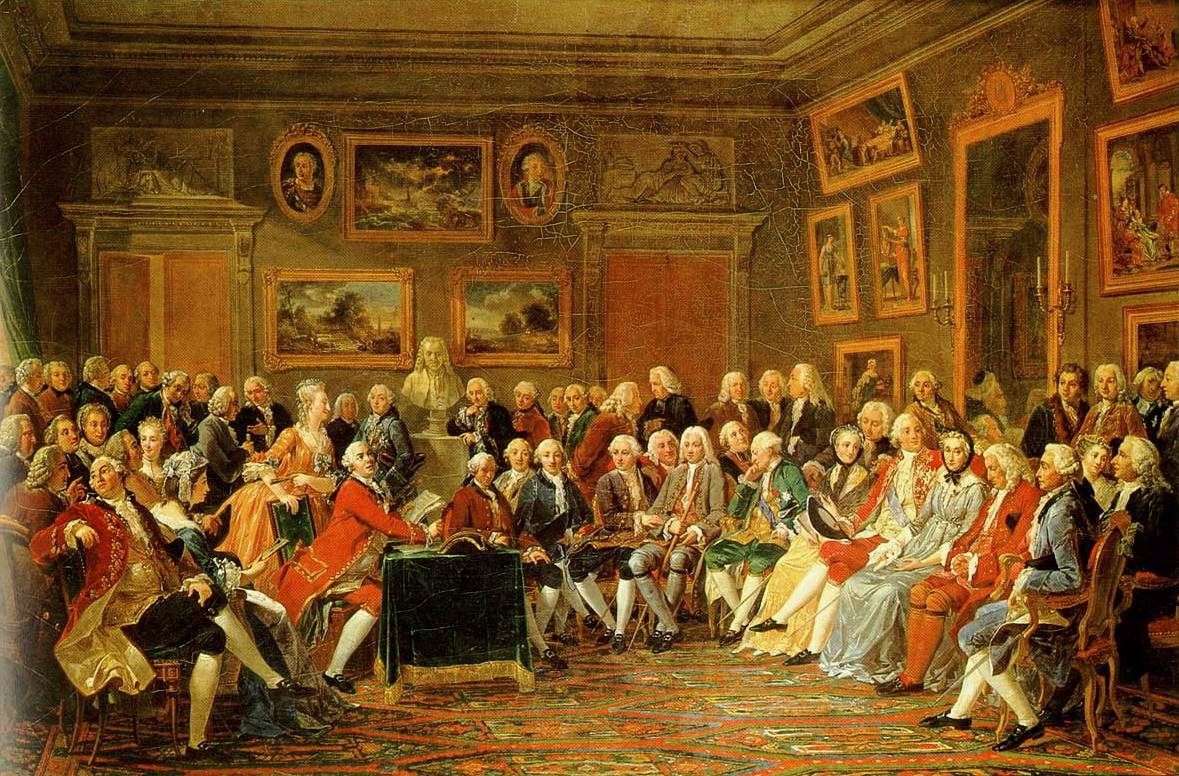
In the Salon of Madame Geoffrin in 1755 by Anicet Charles Gabriel Lemonnier, 1812

The Enlightenment is a period of history identified with the eighteenth century. Arising throughout Europe, Enlightenment philosophy emphasised reason as the foremost source of authority in all matters, and was simultaneously linked to increased secularisation and often political upheaval. The most obvious example of this link is the French Revolution of 1789. The Enlightenment in France is tightly associated with the rise of the salons and the academies, institutions which have been intensely studied by many notable historians. The English Enlightenment has historically been largely associated with the rise of coffeehouse culture, a topic also investigated by many historians. More recent scholarship has identified early elements of the Enlightenment in other European countries, such as the Low Countries.

=== The Public Sphere ===
While the Enlightenment was an incredibly diverse phenomenon that varied from country to country, one aspect common to each country was the rise of the "public sphere". The concept of the public sphere was articulated by Jürgen Habermas, a German sociologist and philosopher. Habermas saw in the eighteenth century the rise of new realm of communication that emphasised new areas of debate, as well as a surge in print culture. This new arena, which Habermas termed the "bourgeois public sphere," was characterised as separate from traditional authorities and accessible to all people, and could therefore act as a platform for criticism and the development of new ideas and philosophy. While the degree to which the salons and academies of France can be considered part of the public sphere has been questioned, the debating societies of London are undoubtedly part of the Enlightened public sphere. The relatively unrestricted print industry of late seventeenth century England, as well as the Triennial Act 1694 that required elections of the British Parliament at least every three years, fostered a comparatively active political climate in eighteenth century England, in which the debating societies were able to flourish.

== Origins of debating societies in London ==
While there were comparable societies in other parts of Europe, as well as in other British cities, London was home to the largest number of independent debate societies throughout all of the eighteenth century. This prominence was largely due to prior existence of clubs that had been created for various other reasons, the concentration of population in the capital, as well as other Enlightened philosophical developments.

=== Philosophical origins ===
The Enlightenment saw an increasing emphasis on the concept of "politeness". Perhaps most obvious in the salons of Paris, polite discourse was seen as a way for the rising middle class to access the previously unattainable social status of the upper classes. In England, politeness came to be associated with elocution. Paul Goring argues that "elocutionary movement" arose initially from a desire to make sermons more interesting and attainable. He notes that periodicals such as The Tatler and The Spectator, the quintessential reflections of British public opinion, often criticised Anglican ministers for their oratory. Goring also points out that, in spite of the burgeoning print culture of the eighteenth century, oratory was still the most effective way of communicating with a public that was basically only half literate in 1750.

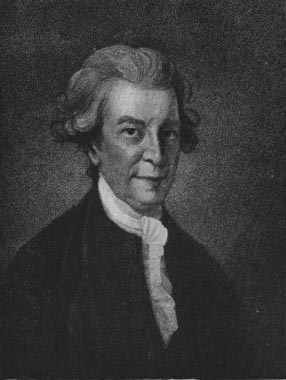
Thomas Sheridan.

The "British elocutionary movement" is linked to Thomas Sheridan, an Irish actor turned orator and author who was an avid proponent of educational reform. A contemporary of Jonathan Swift, Sheridan began his public career with the publishing of British Education; Or, The Source of the Disorders of Great Britain in 1756, which attacked the current practices of education that continued to emphasise Greek and Roman literature, and argued for a new system that instead concentrated on the study of English and elocution. Understandably, Sheridan's work was controversial, and his popularity in London society began to climb.

In 1762, Sheridan published A Course of Lectures on Elocution, a collection of lectures he had given throughout the previous years. These lectures insisted upon a standardised English pronunciation, and emphasised the public speaker as a powerful agent of cultural change. Sheridan also contended that improved oratory would contribute to the stability and strength of the nation of Great Britain, a relatively new ideological concept that reflected the growing interest in nationalism. Sheridan was a noted public speaker in his own right, and his lectures on oratory were well attended throughout Britain. Subscribers to Sheridan's lectures at clubs, universities, and theatres paid a substantial amount (one guinea) to hear the Dublin orator; these lectures, which coincided with the debating societies, reflect the growing interest in public speaking during the eighteenth-century.

=== Structural origins ===
Along with the growing emphasis on politeness and elocution, Donna Andrew suggests four main institutional precursors of the formal debating societies of later eighteenth-century London. First of these were convivial clubs of fifty or more men who met weekly in pubs to discuss politics and religion. An example of this type of club was the Robin Hood Society. The nineteenth century author John Timbs notes:

In the reign of George the Second there met, at a house in Essex-street, in the Strand, the Robin Hood Society, a debating club, at which, every Monday, questions were proposed, and any member might speak on them for seven minutes; after which the "baker", who presided with a hammer in his hand, summed up the arguments.

The "baker" was Caleb Jeacocke, president for 19 years. By the 1730s, the Robin Hood Society was flourishing, and by the 1740s was joined by a similar society known as the Queen's Arms. Other possible origins of the debating societies were the "mooting clubs" established by law students to practice rhetoric and the skills needed for the courtroom, and the "spouting clubs" designed for young actors to practice their delivery. The last possible forerunner of the debating societies given by Andrew is the Oratory of John Henley, commonly known as "Orator Henley". Originally a preacher in the Anglican church, Henley founded his Oratory in 1726 with the principal purpose of "reforming the manner in which such public presentations should be performed." He made extensive use of the print industry to advertise the events of his Oratory, making it an omnipresent part of the London public sphere.

Henley was also instrumental in constructing the space of the debating club: he added two platforms to his room in the Newport district of London to allow for the staging of debates, and structured the entrances to allow for the collection of admission. These changes were further implemented when Henley moved his enterprise to Lincoln's Inn Fields. The public was now willing to pay to be entertained, and Henley exploited this increasing commercialisation of British society. Indeed, commercial interests continued to inform and shape London debating societies in the years following Henley's Oratory. Henley's addresses initially focused on elocution and religious subject matter, but became increasingly directed towards entertainment. Andrew also notes the influence of entertainment on the early debating societies. She cites The Temple of Taste, a venue advertised as including music, poetry, lectures, and debate, as another possible precursor to the more formal debating societies of the later eighteenth century.

In his research on British coffeehouse culture, Brian Cowan briefly examines the Rota Club, a group founded by republican James Harrington in 1659 that met in Miles' Coffeehouse in the New Palace Yard. Attended by Samuel Pepys and John Aubrey, among other notables, the Rota club was designed to debate and discuss the politics of the time. Admission was required, and it was definitely aimed towards the "virtuosi" of society, but it is definitely possible that the Rota inspired the later debating societies. Timbs calls the Rota "a kind of debating society for the dissemination of Republican opinions."

While it is impossible to determine if one or more of these institutions directly engendered the debating societies of later 18th century London, their existence indicates the tendency toward elocution, public debate, and politics that was certainly present in the British mindset.

== Characteristics ==
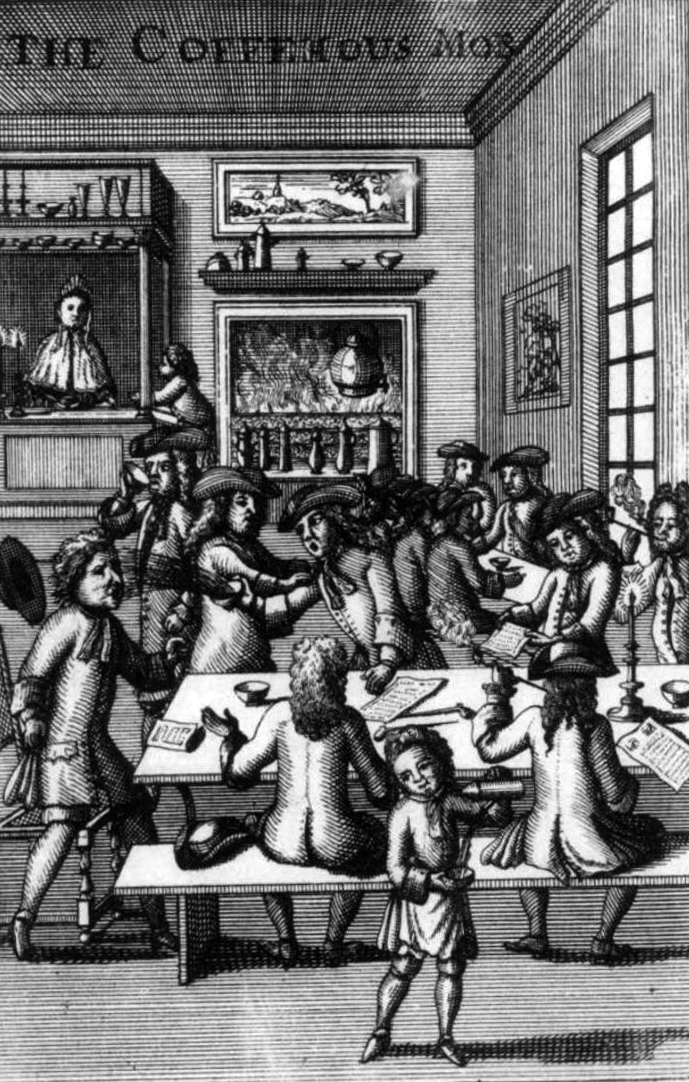
An unruly crowd at a London coffeehouse, 1710.

Regardless of when the debating societies formally began, they were firmly established in London society by the 1770s. At this time, many of the societies began to move out of the pubs and taverns in which they had initially met, and into larger and more sophisticated rooms and halls. Tea, coffee, and sometimes sweets and ice cream replaced the alcohol of the taverns, and the admission fee also increased. The new setting and atmosphere contributed to an overall more respectable audience in line with the Enlightened ideal of politeness. Mary Thale notes that, while the usual admission of a sixpence was not insubstantial, it was considerably less than the price of attending a lecture or the theatre. The debating societies were therefore more accessible to members of the working, middle, and lower classes, truly bringing the "rational entertainment" so favoured during the Enlightenment into the public sphere. Questions and topics for debate, as well as the outcomes of the debates, were advertised in the many London newspapers that flourished during the time, again linking the debating societies with the public sphere.

Andrew emphasises the year 1780 as pivotal in the history of the debating societies. The Morning Chronicle announced on 27 March:

The Rage for publick debate now shews itself in all quarters of the metropolis. Exclusive of the oratorical assemblies at Carlisle House, Free-mason's Hall, the Forum, Spring Gardens, the Cassino, the Mitre Tavern and other polite places of debating rendezvous, we hear that new Schools of Eloquence are preparing to be opened in St. Giles, Clare-Market, Hockley in the Hole, Whitechapel, Rag-Fair, Duke's Place, Billingsgate, and the Back of the Borough.

As the more respectable locales became a firmly entrenched element of the societies, the size of the audiences grew considerably. The move away from pubs and taverns likely contributed to an increased presence of women in the societies, and they were formally invited to take part in debate. In 1780, 35 differently named societies advertised and hosted debates for anywhere between 650 and 1200 people. The question for debate was introduced by a president or moderator who proceeded to regulate the discussion. Speakers were given set amounts of time to argue their point of view, and, at the end of the debate, a vote was taken to determine a decision or adjourn the question for further debate. Speakers were not permitted to slander or insult other speakers, or diverge from the topic at hand, again illustrating the value placed on politeness.

Another feature of London debating societies was the combination of other types of entertainment with the debates. Music, drama, and visual art were sometimes included in the evening's schedule. An advertisement in the London Courant for the University of Rational Amusement on 28 March 1780 read:"Horns and clarinets will assist to fill up the vacancy of time previous to the commencement of the debate." Similarly, an 3 April advertisement in the Morning Chronicle for The Oratorical Hall noted: "The Hall will be grandly illuminated, and the Company entertained with Music until the Debate commences." Some societies also contributed part of the evening's profits to charity. Andrew notes a donation of La Belle Assemblee for "the relief of sufferers from the fire at Cavendish Square."

Overall, the London debating societies represent how British society of the eighteenth century fostered open political, social, and democratic discussion, and exemplify the public sphere.

=== Prominent Debating Societies ===
The number of debating societies is vast and difficult to track, as they frequently changed names and venues. The list that follows is select and by no means comprehensive. The names of the societies themselves, however, are useful in understanding their nature, how they were often linked to their location, and the way they were represented in London society.

- 104 London Debaters
- Debate London
- The Athenian Society
- Capel Court Debating Society
- The Carlisle House School for Eloquence
- City Debates
- The Coachmaker's Hall Society
- London Dialectical Society
- Middlesex Forum
- Oratorical Hall
- Pantheon Society
- Religious Society of Old Portugal Street
- Society for Free Debate
- Society of Cogers
- Sylvan Debating Club
- The University for Rational Amusements
- The Westminster Forum

All Women's Societies

- La Belle Assemblee
- The Carlisle House Debates for Ladies Only
- The Female Congress
- The Female Parliament

== Content of debates ==
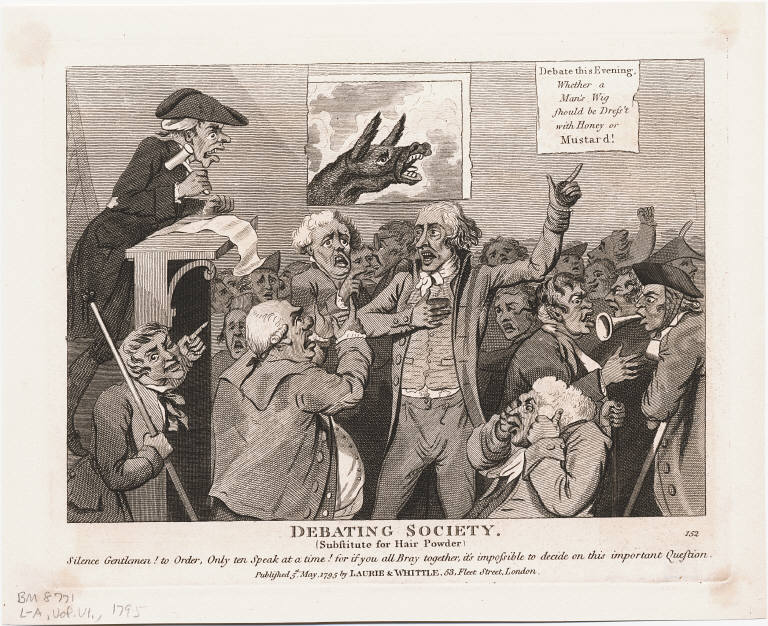
Debate Tonight: Whether a man's wig should be dressed with honey or mustard! A 1795 cartoon satirising the content of debates.

The content of the debates was incredibly diverse, and surprisingly progressive. Political topics that directly challenged governmental policies were common, as were social topics that called into question the authority of traditional institutions such as the church and the family. The gender divide was one of the most often addressed issues, and the simple presence of women in the societies certainly lead to a heightened gender consciousness. Commerce and education were also addressed by the debating societies.

It is important to remember that debating societies were run as commercial enterprises, and were designed to turn a profit for their managers. Thus, the content of the debates was not only informed by political or social sentiment, but by simple entertainment value or interest as well. In general, the debating topics of the 1770s and 1780s were more political and even radical, while the topics of the 1790s up to the decline and disappearance of the societies became less controversial. Donna Andrew's collation of newspaper advertisements from the period of 1776 to 1799 is the seminal resource for investigation of the content of the debating societies.

=== Local politics and current events ===
One of the functions of the debating societies was as a forum for discussion of current events. The specificity of these debates can be seen in many examples. The Society for Free Debate took up the question, "Can Mr. Wilkes and his friend be justified in their present opposition to the Chamberlain?" on 26 April 1776, shortly after Wilkes introduced a parliamentary reform motion in the House of Commons of Great Britain. The Gazetteer reported the results of the debate:

On behalf of Mr. Wilkes and his supporters it was urged, that as friends of free elections, they were consistent in endeavouring to destroy the effect of one, wherein freedom had been grossly violated. On the other hand it was argued, that a scrutiny would have been much better, as by it every one who affirmed a privilege to which by law or equity they had no claim, would have been detected; and, that declining this, shewed an attachment to private interest more than to public justice. These arguments met with the approbation of a majority of the company.

The Gordon riots, anti-Catholic uprisings led by Lord George Gordon in 1780, were certainly a hot topic. The King's Arms Society, for Free and Candid Debate, asked, "Were the late Riots the effect of Accident or Design?" on 7 September, and, three months later, the Pantheon society debated "Can the conduct of Lord George Gordon respecting the Protestant Association be construed into High Treason?"

In response to governmental controls placed on the debating societies in the 1790s, the Westminster Forum debated the question, "Is not the prohibition of public discussion, a violation of the spirit of a free constitution?" and, less than two weeks later, "Ought the Public Debating Societies and the late Meetings at Copenhagen House to be supported, as friendly to the Rights of the People; or suppressed, as the Causes of the Insult offered to His Majesty, and justifiable Reasons for introducing the Convention Bill?" Clearly the debating societies offer valuable insight into the political climate of the times.

=== Foreign policy and international events ===
Debates were not restricted to only local issues and events. The foreign policy of the British Empire was a key concern of the societies. The turbulent colonial relations of the time, including the break out of the American Revolution, and continued conflict of the British East India Company in India, provided ample fodder for the debating societies.

In February 1776, in the midst of the Boston campaign, the Robin Hood Society asked, "Is it manifest that the Colonies affect independency?" As the war continued, so did the debates. In May, the Robin Hood again took on the colonial dispute and asked, "Is it now compatible with the dignity, interest, and duty of Great Britain, to treat with America on terms of accommodation?"

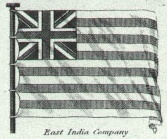
Flag of the British East India Company.

In 1791, the society at Coachmaker's Hall debated the question, "Is not the war now carrying on in India disgraceful to this country, injurious to its political interest, and ruinous to the commercial interests of the Company?" on two separate occasions, deciding almost unanimously that "war is unjust, disgraceful and ruinous." The society followed that debate with the question, "Would it be most for the interest of this country, that the territorial possessions in India should still continue in the hands of the present East India Company, be taken under the sole and immediate direction of the Legislature, or be relinquished to the native inhabitants of the country?" for two weeks as well.

Events on the continent, such as the French Revolution, were also discussed by the debating societies. After the storming of the Bastille in July 1789, the society at Coachmaker's Hall advertised a debate on "Whether the late Destruction of the Bastile, and the spirited Conduct of the French, do not prove that the general Opinion of their being possessed by a slavish Disposition was founded in National Prejudice?" Later that year, they again asked, "Is the Conduct of the French Assembly, in declaring the Possession of the Church to be the Property of the Nation, and their Care in providing for the inferior Clergy, worthy the Imitation of this Country?" Considering the eventual ramifications of the French Revolution, the early concern of the debating societies for events outside their own borders illustrates the progressive nature of the societies.

=== Commerce ===
The sphere of commerce was also of concern to the debating societies. From small scale local issues to commercial matters facing the Empire abroad, commercial topics for debate were abundant. In an advertisement for the society at Coachmaker's Hall, Parker's General Advertiser asked "Is the present mode of reducing the price of Bread consistent with fair trade, and likely to produce any public good?" The Robin Hood asked, "Whether a union with Ireland, similar to that with Scotland, would not be injurious to the commercial interests of Great Britain?" A 1780 debate at the Carlisle House School of Eloquence asked, "Whether it will be most conducive to the general good of the Community that the East India Company should be dissolved, or their Charter renewed?"

=== Education ===
The debating societies also addressed matters of education. The rise of the middle class, the educational reforms spearheaded by people such as Thomas Sheridan, and increased commercialisation had thrown the ideals of a classical education into the realm of debate. As early as 1776, the Robin Hood Society debated the question, "Whether a liberal and learned Education is proper for a Person intended for commerce?" In 1779, the society at Coachmaker's Hall asked, "Is the system of education generally practiced in this nation, more favourable or unfavourable to liberty?"

With the inclusion of women in the debating societies, the question of female education also came to the fore. The 3 April 1780 masquerade meeting of The Oratorical Hall in Spring Gardens asked, "Is it not detrimental to the world to restrain the female sex from the pursuit of classical and mathematical learning?" The advertisement also notes, "It is particularly hoped that Ladies will avail themselves of their masks and join in the debate." An October meeting of the society at Coachmaker's Hall investigated the question: "Would it not tend to the happiness of mankind, if women were allowed a scientific education?" Again, the progressive nature of the debating societies is shown through their content and attitude towards women.

=== Religion ===
Along with the progressive and sometimes radical nature of the debates, traditional questions of religion remained a central issue for the debating societies. Society meetings that took place on Sunday often based discussion on a particular verse of scripture. For example, the 14 May 1780 Theological Question of the University for Rational Amusements was based on Romans 4:5: "But to him that worketh not, but believeth on him that justifieth the ungodly, his faith is counted for righteousness."

Questions on religion's role in society and relationship to politics were also discussed. The Society for Free Debate asked, "Can a Roman Catholic, consistent with his religious principle, be a good subject to a Protestant Prince?" The Westminster Forum posed the question, "Are not the Bishops and others of the clergy who have denied their support and assistance to the Protestant Association, highly culpable in so doing?" Given the history of religious wars in Britain and the continued struggle between Protestants and Catholics, these debates were obviously quite significant to the London population.

=== Love, sex, marriage, and relations between the sexes ===
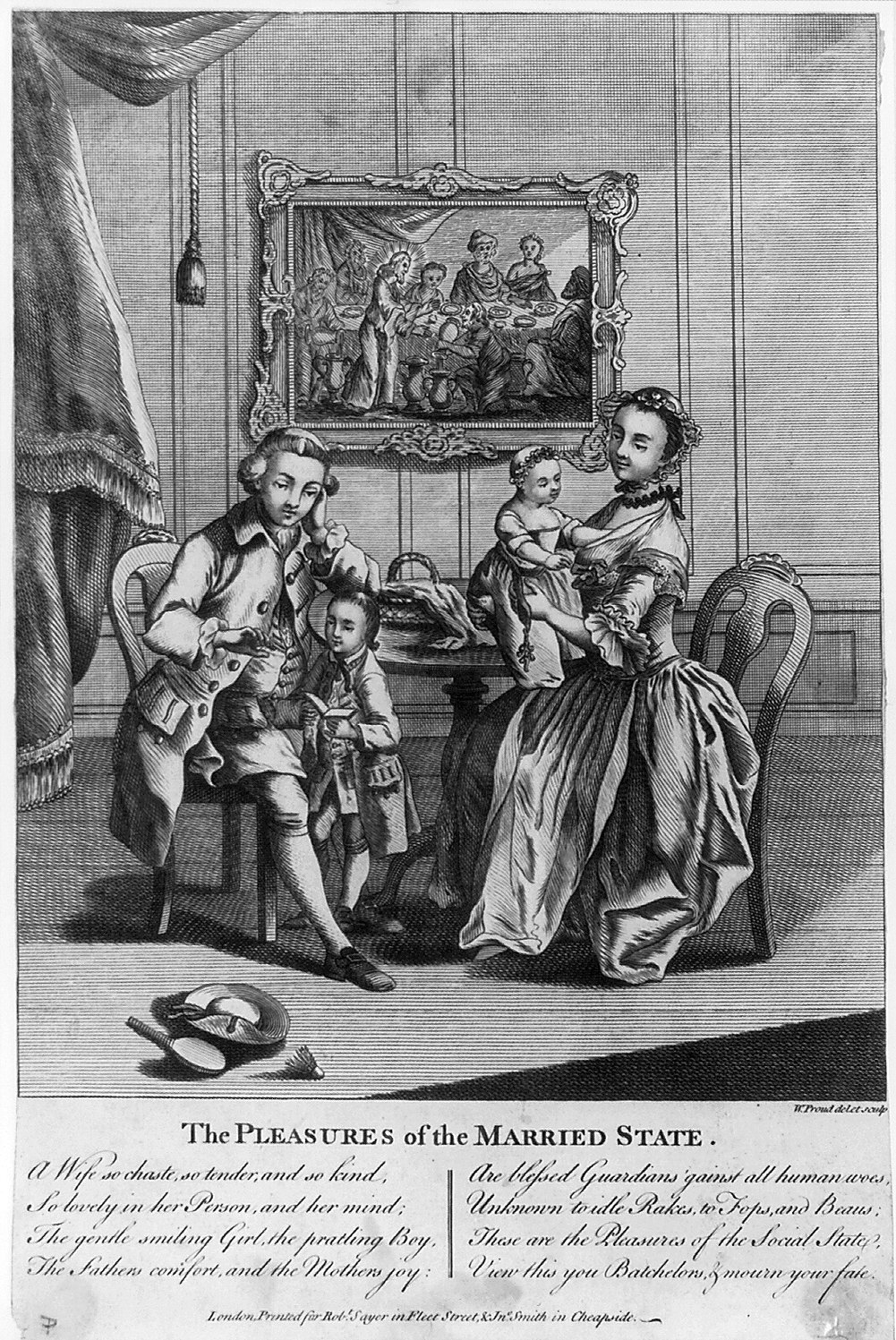
The cover to a panegyric on the married state, published in London, c. 1780

Perhaps one of the most interesting and radical themes of the debating societies was the continued and varied debate on men and women and their interactions. The presence of women in the societies meant that the debates had a chance of accurately representing contemporary women's own viewpoints on their role in society, not simply those of men, making the debates a significant marker of popular thought and opinion.

The Oratorical Academy at Mitre Tavern asked, "Can friendship subsist between the two sexes, without the passion of love?" In discussing marriage, La Belle Assemblée, a women's only society, asked, "In the failure of a mutual affection in the married state, which is to be preferred, to love or be loved?" The New Westminster Forum questioned, "Which is the more disagreeable, a jealous or a scolding Wife?" The society at Coachmaker's Hall debated, "Is not the deliberate Seduction of the Fair, with an intention to desert, under all circumstances, equal to murder?" American John Neal in the mid 1820s proposed the resolve, "That the intellectual powers of the two sexes are equal."

Though the decision was negative in this case, the question indicated the seriousness with which these questions were approached. Other questions seem to reveal a genuine interest in understanding relationships: "Which is to be preferred in the choice of a wife, beauty without fortune, or fortune without beauty?" and "Is it the love of the mental or personal charms of the fair sex, that is more likely to induce men to enter into the married state?"

These questions of love and marriage, and happiness in marriage, indicate how the social climate was changing, allowing for such discussions of gender relations. The societies were, in essence, part of a complete redefinition of gender roles that was underway in the late eighteenth century and into the nineteenth.

== Decline ==
While the debating societies of 18th-century London were prominent fixtures of the public sphere, and not initially restricted by the government, they were not without their critics. Andrew describes some of the negative reaction to the societies thus:

Critics of public debate were clearly upset by what they saw as a raggle-taggle collection of poor and uniformed folk discussing issues of the day, as though anything they would have to say could be of any interest of importance."

The active presence of women in the societies inevitably raised some eyebrows among more traditional types, and the debates on religious matters could not have been met with mere acceptance by the church and the clergy. Andrew cites the example of Bishop Porteus who called the debating societies, "schools of infidelity and popery." The political bent of many of the debates was seen as increasingly threatening as the French Revolution heightened the political climate.

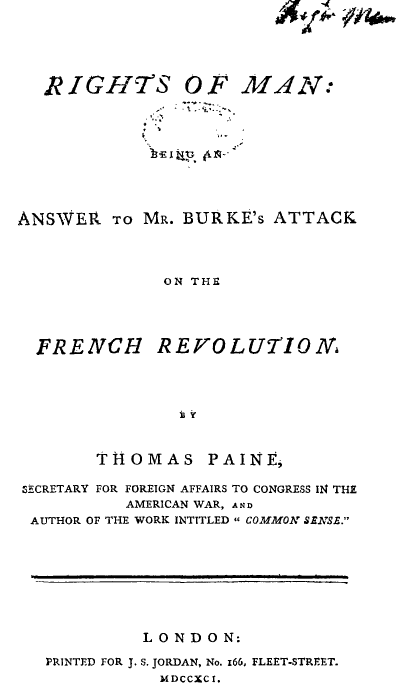
Cover to Thomas Paine's Rights of Man, 1791.

After their peak in 1780, the London debating societies generally declined in number and frequency, rising again slightly around the late 1780s, only to fall off completely by the end of the century. The French Revolution began in 1789 and Thale notes that,

The possibility of parliamentary reform had occasionally been debated in the 1770s and 1780s; but now it took on a new importance inasmuch as it was being debated by people who saw it not as an abstract principle but as a reality their neighbours had achieved, even if by drastic means.

Understandably fearful of the ramifications of such an example just across the English Channel, the British government began to crack down on the debating societies. Without specific legislation to block the meetings, the government often intimidated or threatened the landlords of the venues where debates were held, who in turn closed the buildings to the public. 1792 saw the formation of the London Corresponding Society, a group of artisans, mechanics, and shopkeepers. The LCS met in pubs and taverns, discussed openly radical works such as Thomas Paine's Rights of Man, and issued proclamations in newspapers calling for adult male suffrage and parliamentary reform. Such overt radicalism certainly attracted the attention of the government, and on 21 May 1792, King George III issued a proclamation for the prevention of "seditious meetings and writings." While the proclamation did not make explicit reference to the debating societies, the membership of the LCS and the debating societies likely overlapped, and a cautionary response on behalf of the societies was observed.

For the rest of 1792, no debating societies advertised in the London newspapers. The debating societies gradually returned until late 1795, when the Two Acts were passed by the British parliament. The Treason Act and the Seditious Meeting Act required any meeting where money was taken to be licensed by two Justices of the Peace. The acts restricted public meetings to fifty persons, allowed licences to be revoked at any time, and invoked much stiffer penalties for any anti-monarchist sentiment. These acts effectively eliminated public, political debate, and, while the societies did continue until the turn of the century, their content was decidedly less radical and challenging. An advertisement for the London Forum in the 7 November 1796 Morning Herald warned that "Political allusion is utterly inadmissible," a stark contrast to the debates of previous years. Historian Iain McCalman has argued that in the wake of the repression of the formal debating clubs, more informal societies continued to meet in taverns and alehouses, as they were harder to control. McCalman sees in these meetings the foundations of British ultra-radicalism, and movements such as British Jacobinism and Chartism.

Debating societies were an important fixture of the London social landscape for the better part of the eighteenth century. Shaped by the initial tolerance of British politics of the time, and demonstrating a progressive, democratic, and equality-minded attitude, the debating societies are perhaps the best example of truly Enlightened ideals and the rise of the public sphere.

== Survivors and outlook ==
Due to the aforementioned decline, few of the original London debating societies have survived to the 21st century, though there are notable exceptions.

The Society of Cogers, founded 1755, still operates to this day in the City of London. During the 18th century, the aforementioned anti-sedition pressure led the Cogers to recognise the monarchy explicitly in meetings. This holds to this day, where a picture of the sovereign and a "royal reference" in each meeting's opening speech maintains this tradition. Though it was strongly affected by the closure of major newspaper offices in Fleet Street from the 1960s, fragmenting into three separately-run clubs by the late 1990s as a result, ultimately those coalesced into a single Cogers organisation. The society celebrated its 250th anniversary with a keynote debate in 2005. Cogers members who were part of the original society in the 1950s and 1960s still attended regularly well into the late 2010s, ensuring continuity of the Cogers style of debating.

While much younger than the original wave of London debating societies, the Sylvan Debating Club was founded in London in 1868 and has been in continuous operation since then. Membership went into decline in the late 1990s and early 2000s, but has since rebounded, and the club celebrated its 150th anniversary in 2018. Longstanding members attended the celebration, who had indeed attended the club's 100th anniversary in 1968.

In addition, many new debating societies have been formed in London in recent years, including those affiliated with universities as well as independent clubs. The internet and social media have supported this activity, providing new channels to reach potential members interested in debate. During the COVID-19 lockdown in 2020, debates in many clubs moved to online video platforms such as Zoom. Post pandemic, many have returned to in-person debating, with some still offering an online option. Overall, debating activity in London has increased in recent times, with the potential for it to continue well into the future.

== See also ==
- Salon (gathering)
- Academy
- English coffeehouses in the seventeenth and eighteenth centuries
- Public House
- London Corresponding Society
- Elocution
- Thomas Sheridan
- John Henley
- Republic of Letters
- Age of Enlightenment
- Public Sphere

== Bibliography ==
- Andrew, Donna T. London Debating Societies, 1776–1799. London Record Society, 1994.
- Andrew, Donna T. "Popular Culture and Public Debate: London 1780," The Historical Journal 39, no. 2 (June 1996): 405–23.
- Benzie, W. The Dublin Orator: Thomas Sheridan's Influence on Eighteenth-century Rhetoric and Belles Lettres. Menston: Scolar Press Limited, 1972.
- Cowan, Brian William. The Social Life of Coffee: The Emergence of the British Coffeehouse. New Haven: Yale University Press, 2005.
- Goring, Paul. The Rhetoric of Sensibility in Eighteenth-Century Culture. Cambridge: Cambridge University Press, 2005.
- McCalman, Iain. "Ultra-Radicalism and Convivial Debating-Clubs in London, 1795–1838." The English Historical Review 102, no. 403 (April 1987): 309–33.
- Munck, Thomas. The Enlightenment: A Comparative Social History 1721–1794. New York: Oxford University Press, 2000.
- Neal, John. Wandering Recollections of a Somewhat Busy Life. Boston: Roberts Brothers, 1869.
- Thale, Mary. "London Debating Societies in the 1790s." The Historical Journal 32, no. 1 (March 1989): 57–86.
- Timbs, John. Clubs and Club Life in London. Detroit: Gale Research Company, 1967. First published 1866 by Chatto and Windus, Publishers, London.
- Van Horn Melton, James. The Rise of the Public in Enlightenment Europe. Cambridge: Cambridge University Press, 2001.
