= Caleb Jeacocke =

English baker, businessman and orator (1706–1786)

Caleb Jeacocke (1706–1786) was an English baker, businessman and orator, known for his participation in the Robin Hood Society, a London debating society.

== Life ==
Jeacocke carried on the business of a baker in High Street, St. Giles's, London, and became a director of the Hand-in-Hand fire office, and a member of the Skinners' Company. He frequently attended the Robin Hood debating society which held meetings in Butcher Row, Temple Bar.

The oratory of Jeacocke gained a reputation, as more effective than that of Edmund Burke and others. Oliver Goldsmith was introduced to the society by Samuel Derrick. At a time when Jeacocke was president, sitting in a large gilt chair, Goldsmith commented that nature had meant him for a Lord Chancellor; "No, no," whispered Derrick, "only for a Master of the Rolls".

Jeacocke died on 7 January 1786, in Denmark Street, Soho, London. He was author of A Vindication of the Moral Character of the Apostle Paul against the Charges of Hypocrisy and Insincerity brought by Lord Bolingbroke, Dr. Middleton, and others, London, 1765.

== Notes ==
Attribution

This article incorporates text from a publication now in the public domain: Lee, Sidney, ed. (1892). "Jeacocke, Caleb". Dictionary of National Biography. Vol. 29. London: Smith, Elder & Co.
