= Caithness and Sutherland =

Parliamentary constituency in the United Kingdom, 1918–1997

- Former county constituency for the House of Commons
- Location of Caithness and Sutherland within Scotland
- Subdivision: Highland

1918–1997
- Created from: Caithness, Sutherland and Wick Burghs
- Replaced by: Caithness, Sutherland & Easter Ross

Caithness and Sutherland was a county constituency of the House of Commons of the Parliament of the United Kingdom from 1918 to 1997. It elected one Member of Parliament (MP) by the first past the post system of election.

The constituency was created by merging the constituencies of Caithness and Sutherland and the Dornoch and Wick components of the Wick Burghs constituency.

In 1997 the constituency was superseded by the creation of Caithness, Sutherland and Easter Ross, which merged Caithness and Sutherland and the Easter Ross area of Ross, Cromarty and Skye.

Caithness and Sutherland was geographically one of the largest constituencies in the United Kingdom, as well as the most northerly constituency on the mainland (only the island constituency of Orkney and Shetland was further north).

== 1918 constituency reform ==
The creation of Caithness and Sutherland as a single constituency was a part of a package of boundary reform also affecting many other parts of the United Kingdom. The reform was the first since the Redistribution of Seats Act 1885, and its main aim was to make constituencies more equal in terms of the sizes of their electorates.

== Local government areas ==
=== 1918 to 1975 ===
When created the constituency covered the county of Caithness and the county of Sutherland, including the burghs of Dornoch, Thurso and Wick.

=== 1975 to 1983 ===
In 1975 counties and burghs were abolished and the constituency became an area within the Highland region. The region included two new local government districts, called Caithness and Sutherland. The Caithness district was entirely within the constituency. The Sutherland district had a small area, the Kincardine electoral division, within the Ross and Cromarty constituency.

=== 1983 to 1996 ===
Constituency boundaries were redrawn in 1983, and the Caithness and Sutherland constituency was enlarged to cover the whole of the Sutherland district.

=== 1996 to 1997 ===
In 1996 the districts were abolished and the Highland region became a unitary council area. Throughout the remainder of the life of the constituency the Highland Council had area committees representing the areas of the former districts.

== Members of Parliament ==
Election	Member	Party
1918	Sir Leicester Harmsworth	Coalition Liberal
1922	Sir Archibald Sinclair	National Liberal
1923	Sir Archibald Sinclair	Liberal
1945	Eric Gandar Dower	Conservative
1950	Sir David Robertson	Conservative
1959	Sir David Robertson	Independent Conservative
1964	George Mackie	Liberal
1966	Robert Maclennan	Labour
1981	Robert Maclennan	SDP
1988	Robert Maclennan	Liberal Democrats
1997	constituency abolished	

At the time of the 1918 general election, Sir Leicester Harmsworth had been MP for the constituency of Caithness since the 1900 general election.

In the general election of 1997, Robert Maclennan was elected MP for the then new constituency of Caithness, Sutherland and Easter Ross, a seat he held until retiring from parliament at the 2001 general election.

== Election results ==
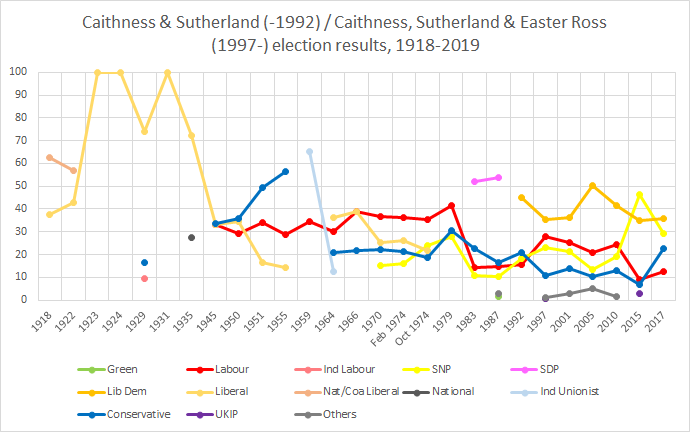
Election results since 1918

=== Elections in the 1910s ===
Sir Leicester Harmsworth

General election 1918: Caithness and Sutherland
Party		Candidate	Votes	%	±%
C	National Liberal	Leicester Harmsworth	6,769	62.6	
	Liberal	Francis John Robertson	4,036	37.4	
Majority			2,733	25.2	
Turnout			10,785		
	National Liberal win (new seat)				
C indicates candidate endorsed by the coalition government.

=== Elections in the 1920s ===
General election 1922: Caithness and Sutherland
Party	Candidate	Votes	%	±%
National Liberal	Archibald Sinclair	7,715	57.1	−5.5
Liberal	Leicester Harmsworth	5,803	42.9	+5.5
Majority		1,912	14.2	−11.0
Turnout		13,518	60.1	
National Liberal hold		Swing		

General election 1923: Caithness and Sutherland
Party	Candidate	Votes	%	±%
Liberal	Archibald Sinclair	Unopposed	N/A	N/A
Liberal hold				

General election 1924: Caithness and Sutherland
Party	Candidate	Votes	%	±%
Liberal	Archibald Sinclair	Unopposed	N/A	N/A
Liberal hold				

General election 1929: Caithness and Sutherland
Party	Candidate	Votes	%	±%
Liberal	Archibald Sinclair	13,462	73.9	N/A
Unionist	James Duncan	3,041	16.7	New
Independent Labour	Charles G Oman	1,711	9.4	New
Majority		10,421	57.2	N/A
Turnout		18,214	66.5	N/A
Liberal hold		Swing	N/A	

=== Elections in the 1930s ===
General election 1931: Caithness and Sutherland
Party	Candidate	Votes	%	±%
Liberal	Archibald Sinclair	Unopposed	N/A	N/A
Liberal hold				

General election 1935: Caithness and Sutherland
Party	Candidate	Votes	%	±%
Liberal	Archibald Sinclair	12,071	72.32	N/A
National	William Bruce	4,621	27.68	New
Majority		7,650	44.64	N/A
Turnout		16,692	60.06	N/A
Liberal hold		Swing	N/A	

=== Elections in the 1940s ===
General election 1945: Caithness and Sutherland
Party	Candidate	Votes	%	±%
Unionist	Eric Gandar Dower	5,564	33.5	N/A
Labour	Robert Ian Aonas MacInnes	5,558	33.4	New
Liberal	Archibald Sinclair	5,503	33.1	−39.2
Majority		6	0.04	N/A
Turnout		16,625	64.2	+4.1
Unionist gain from Liberal		Swing		

=== Elections in the 1950s ===
General election 1950: Caithness and Sutherland
Party	Candidate	Votes	%	±%
Unionist	David Robertson	6,969	36.0	+2.5
Liberal	Archibald Sinclair	6,700	34.6	+1.5
Labour	Alasdair MacArthur	5,676	29.3	−4.1
Majority		269	1.4	+1.4
Turnout		25,021	76.6	+12.4
Unionist hold		Swing	+3.3	

General election 1951: Caithness and Sutherland
Party	Candidate	Votes	%	±%
Unionist	David Robertson	9,814	49.2	+13.2
Labour	Richard Murray	6,799	34.1	+4.8
Liberal	Peter J M McEwan	3,299	16.6	−18.0
Majority		3,015	15.14	+14.7
Turnout		19,912	73.26	+3.3
Unionist hold		Swing	+4.2	

General election 1955: Caithness and Sutherland
Party	Candidate	Votes	%	±%
Unionist	David Robertson	10,453	56.5	+7.3
Labour	Hugh F Sutherland	5,364	29.0	−5.1
Liberal	John Stuart Mowat	2,674	14.5	−2.1
Majority		5,089	27.5	+12.4
Turnout		18,491	69.5	−3.8
Unionist hold		Swing	+6.1	

General election 1959: Caithness and Sutherland
Party	Candidate	Votes	%	±%
Ind. Unionist	David Robertson	12,163	65.3	+8.8
Labour	Ronald Murray	6,438	34.6	+5.6
Majority		5,725	30.7	N/A
Turnout		18,601	69.6	+0.1
Ind. Unionist gain from Unionist		Swing		

=== Elections in the 1960s ===
General election 1964: Caithness and Sutherland
Party	Candidate	Votes	%	±%
Liberal	George Mackie	7,894	36.1	New
Labour	John B Urquhart	6,619	30.2	−4.4
Unionist	Patrick Maitland	4,550	20.8	New
Ind. Unionist	John M Young	2,795	12.7	−52.6
Majority		1,275	5.9	N/A
Turnout		21,858	80.1	+11.5
Liberal gain from Ind. Unionist		Swing		

General election 1966: Caithness and Sutherland
Party	Candidate	Votes	%	±%
Labour	Robert Maclennan	8,308	39.1	+8.9
Liberal	George Mackie	8,244	38.8	+2.7
Conservative	Hamish Watt	4,662	21.9	+1.1
Majority		64	0.3	N/A
Turnout		21,214	79.2	−0.9
Labour gain from Liberal		Swing	+3.1	

=== Elections in the 1970s ===
General election 1970: Caithness and Sutherland
Party	Candidate	Votes	%	±%
Labour	Robert Maclennan	8,768	36.7	−2.4
Liberal	George Mackie	6,063	25.4	−13.4
Conservative	John M Young	5,334	22.3	+0.4
SNP	Donald G. Barr	3,690	15.4	New
Majority		2,705	11.3	+11.0
Turnout		23,855		
Labour hold		Swing	+5.5	

General election February 1974: Caithness and Sutherland
Party	Candidate	Votes	%	±%
Labour	Robert Maclennan	8,574	36.2	−0.5
Liberal	Michael R Burnett	6,222	26.2	+0.8
Conservative	G Susan Bell	5,104	21.5	−0.8
SNP	Eric Alexander Sutherland	3,814	16.1	+0.7
Majority		2,352	10.0	−1.3
Turnout		23,714	83.0	
Labour hold		Swing	-0.7	

General election October 1974: Caithness and Sutherland
Party	Candidate	Votes	%	±%
Labour	Robert Maclennan	7,941	35.3	−0.9
SNP	Eric Alexander Sutherland	5,381	23.9	+7.8
Liberal	Michael R Burnett	4,949	22.0	−4.2
Conservative	Albert McQuarrie	4,240	18.8	−2.7
Majority		2,560	11.4	+1.4
Turnout		22,511	78.1	−4.9
Labour hold		Swing	−4.3	

General election 1979: Caithness and Sutherland
Party	Candidate	Votes	%	±%
Labour	Robert Maclennan	9,613	41.5	+6.2
Conservative	Richard H. Wardrop	7,074	30.5	+11.7
SNP	Robin R. Shaw	6,487	28.0	+4.1
Majority		2,539	11.0	−0.4
Turnout		23,714	78.4	+0.3
Labour hold		Swing	−2.7	

=== Elections in the 1980s ===
General election 1983: Caithness and Sutherland
Party	Candidate	Votes	%	±%
SDP	Robert Maclennan	12,119	52.0	+10.5
Conservative	Alistair M. Scouller	5,276	22.7	−7.8
Labour	Danny Carrigan	3,325	14.3	−27.2
SNP	Jim Ingram	2,568	11.0	−17.0
Majority		6,843	29.3	N/A
Turnout		23,288	75.4	−3.0
SDP gain from Labour		Swing		

General election 1987: Caithness and Sutherland
Party	Candidate	Votes	%	±%
SDP	Robert Maclennan	12,338	53.7	+1.7
Conservative	Robert Hamilton	3,844	16.7	−6.0
Labour	Allan Byron	3,437	14.9	+0.6
SNP	Archibal MacGregor	2,371	10.3	−0.7
Independent Liberal	William Mowat	686	2.9	New
Green	Bernard Planterose	333	1.4	New
Majority		8,494	37.0	+7.7
Turnout		23,009	73.6	−1.8
SDP hold		Swing	+3.8	

=== Elections in the 1990s ===
General election 1992: Caithness and Sutherland
Party	Candidate	Votes	%	±%
Liberal Democrats	Robert Maclennan	10,032	45.1	−8.6
Conservative	George Bruce	4,667	20.9	+4.2
SNP	Kerr MacGregor	4,049	18.2	+7.9
Labour	Michael F. Coyne	3,483	15.6	+0.7
Majority		5,365	24.2	−12.8
Turnout		22,231	72.5	−1.1
Liberal Democrats hold		Swing	−6.4	

== See also ==
- Former United Kingdom Parliament constituencies
