= Fred Harmsworth =

English footballer

Personal information
- Full name: Frederick Harmsworth
- Date of birth: 1877
- Place of birth: Croxton Kerrial, England
- Position: Wing half

Senior career*
Years	Team	Apps	(Gls)
1903–1904	Grimsby Town	5	(0)
- * Club domestic league appearances and goals

Frederick Harmsworth (1877 – after 1903) was an English professional footballer who played as a wing half.
