= Graham Cox (Australian footballer) =

Australian rules footballer

Personal information
- Full name: Graham Cox
- Born: 26 June 1933
- Died: 11 June 1973 (aged 39)
- Original team: St Ignatious
- Height: 178 cm (5 ft 10 in)
- Weight: 71 kg (157 lb)

Playing career^{1}
Years	Club	Games (Goals)
1952–56	Richmond	32 (15)
- ^{1} Playing statistics correct to the end of 1956.

Graham Cox (26 June 1933 – 11 June 1973) was an Australian rules footballer who played with Richmond in the Victorian Football League (VFL).
