= Sir Hildebrand Harmsworth, 2nd Baronet =

Sir Hildebrand Alfred Beresford Harmsworth, 2nd Baronet (27 May 1901 – 15 November 1977), known as "Sunny" Harmsworth, was a member of the Harmsworth newspaper publishing family but took no part in the family business.

== Early life ==
Hildebrand Alfred Beresford Harmsworth was born on 27 May 1901, the first son of Sir Hildebrand Harmsworth, 1st Baronet, and Kathleen Mary Harmsworth, née Berton. He was educated at Harrow School. By the time of the 1911 census the family were living at First Avenue, Hove, East Sussex. He had three brothers, Ronald Aubrey Leicester Harmsworth (1902 – 26 January 1946), Chamberlain Michael Hildebrand Harmsworth (born 1903), and Perceval Anthony Thomas Harmsworth (born 1907).

== Family ==
Harmsworth inherited the baronetage in 1929 on the death of his father from cirrhosis of the liver. He married Elen Billenstein (died 29 December 2005), daughter of Nicolaj Billenstein of Randers, Denmark, in 1925. They had a son, Hildebrand Harold Harmsworth, who became the 3rd Baronet, and a daughter, Ingeborg Kathleen Elen Harmsworth.

== Later life ==
In later life, Harmsworth lived on the income from a Canadian trust, and had houses at Long Island, New York; Florida; and Deepdene, Surrey. He died on 15 November 1977, not having divorced, and left his money to Valerie de Pass, his companion of 40 years, leading to legal action from his estranged wife. In proceedings he was described by the judge as "a restless and self-centered man who could not bear to be alone, and whose life centered on his women friends, fishing, and his need for sun".

Baronetage of the United Kingdom
Preceded by Hildebrand Harmsworth	Baronet of Freshwater Grove; 1929–1977	Succeeded by Hildebrand Harmsworth
