= Graham Cox (judge) =

The Honourable Sheriff Cox

Sheriff Principal of South Strathclyde, Dumfries and Galloway
- In office 1993–2000

Personal details
- Born: Graham Loudon Cox; 22 December 1933 Newcastle
- Died: 27 December 2014 (aged 81) Crail
- Spouse: Jean Nelson
- Education: University of Edinburgh
- Profession: Advocate

Sheriff Principal Graham Cox, QC was a Sheriff Principal of South Strathclyde, Dumfries and Galloway; Sheriff of Tayside, Central and Fife, Scotland; and Member of Council, The Commonwealth Magistrates and Judges Association.

== Education ==
Graham London Cox was born in Newcastle-upon-Tyne on 22 December 1933 and received his education at the former Hamilton Academy; the Grove Academy school and at the University of Edinburgh.

== Career ==
Serving in the British Army from 1956 to 1961 and attaining the rank of major in the Directorate of Army Legal Services, Graham Cox was called to the Bar in 1962 and served as an Advocate-depute from 1966 to 1968, in which year he was appointed Sheriff of Tayside, Central and Fife, at Dundee, a post he held until 1993 when he was appointed Queen's Counsel and Sheriff Principal of South Strathclyde, Dumfries and Galloway (1993–2000). It was during his term of office that the suspects arrested regarding the Lockerbie air disaster appeared before him on 6 April 1999 at a makeshift Scottish court at Kamp Van Zeist, The Netherlands; this court appearance starting off the subsequent legal proceedings in the trial of suspects.

Cox served as secretary of the Sheriffs' Association from 1987 to 1991 and as president from 1991 to 1993. Other appointments have included, Hon. Vice-president of the Scottish Association for the Study of Delinquency and vice-chairman, Northern Lighthouse Board. In 1991, Graham Cox was appointed a member of council, The Commonwealth Magistrates and Judges Association, a post he has held twice, 1991–94 and again, 1997–2000; and in 2001 he took up the appointment as chairman of the Adoption Policy Advisory Group.

He died in 2014.
