= Cogers =

British free speech society

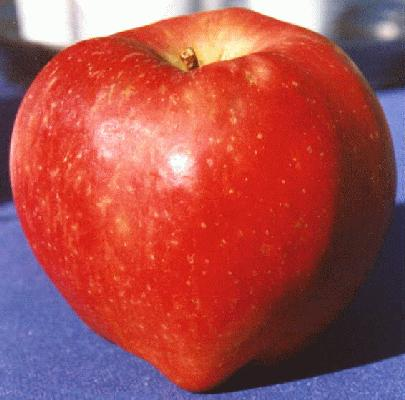
The Apple of Discord is the symbol of Cogers. It is awarded to the speaker who makes the best contribution to the evening's debate.

The Society of Cogers (/ˈkoʊdʒərz/) is a free speech society, established in 1755 in the City of London. It is the oldest debating society in the world and one of the oldest speaking gatherings of any kind.

== History and concept ==
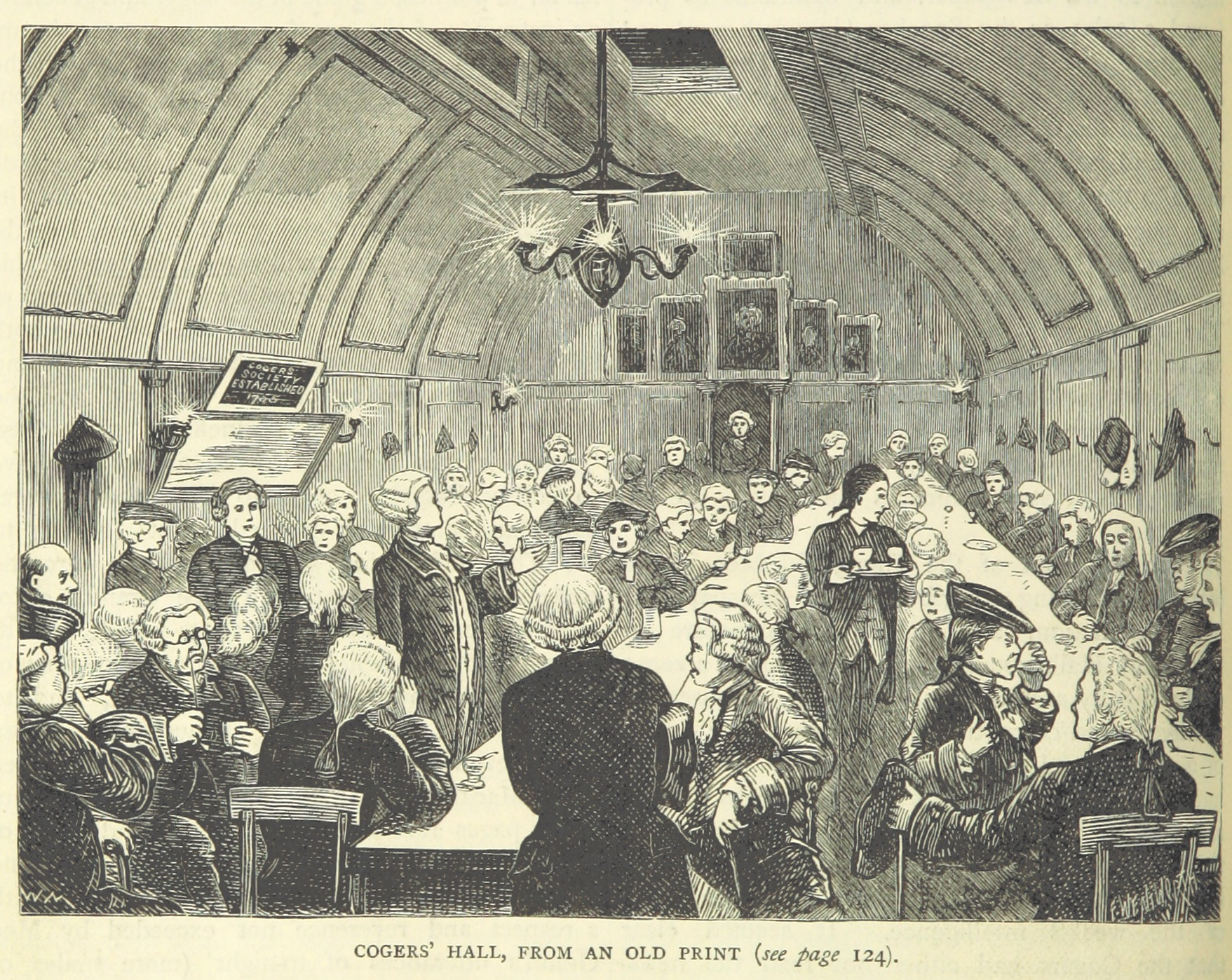
1880s depiction of the Cogers' Discussion Hall in Shoe Lane. The image is based on an 1870 illustration, but the costume of the participants has been anachronistically aged to incorrectly make the scene appear earlier.

The name "Cogers" comes from Descartes' famous assertion, Cogito ergo sum (I think, therefore I am). As a "Society of Thinkers", the Cogers is dedicated to the philosophy of letting everyone express their thoughts. The aims of the Cogers were the promotion of the liberty of the subject and the freedom of the Press, the maintenance of loyalty to the laws, the rights and claims of humanity and the practice of public and private virtue.

The first meeting in 1755 was at the White Bear Inn (now St Brides Tavern), Fleet Street. Meetings were held on Saturday evenings.

In around 1850 it moved to Discussion Hall, Shoe Lane, and in 1871 migrated to the Barley Mow Inn, Salisbury Square, E.C.1, where it remained until the 1960s. Attendances went into decline during the 1970s and 80s. By the mid-90s, the original society had split into two rival factions.

In July 1997 Magnus Nielsen opened a third meeting in Cornhill on the 2nd Monday of each month. This meeting has now moved location to the Old Bank of England in the Strand. The two Saturday night societies have since closed.

Previous members and visitors to the society include founding member John Wilkes, Charles Dickens, William Ewart Gladstone, Benjamin Disraeli, Daniel O'Connell, and many others throughout its 250-year history.

== Format ==
Members meet monthly at pubs in the centre and outside London and begin the evening by having an impartial host rounding up the current affairs of the last month. Then all participants may take turns to have their own five minutes on the podium expressing their views as to what, what's not, and what not on any subjects they feel they would like to bring to the evening. It may be reactions to the previous speakers or their own topics.

The meetings are chaired by the "Grand", who maintains order and also regulates the timing of speeches. The meeting starts with an "Opener", who gives a 15-minute résumé, inviting topics for discussion.

At the end of the evening the traditional "Apple of Discord" is presented by the "Evaluator" to the best speaker of the evening to the speaker who throughout the evening brought the greatest contribution, whether that be thoughtful, entertaining, controversial or outstanding. Participants also have the opportunity to get tips from the evaluator on what their strengths and potentials are.

== Venues ==
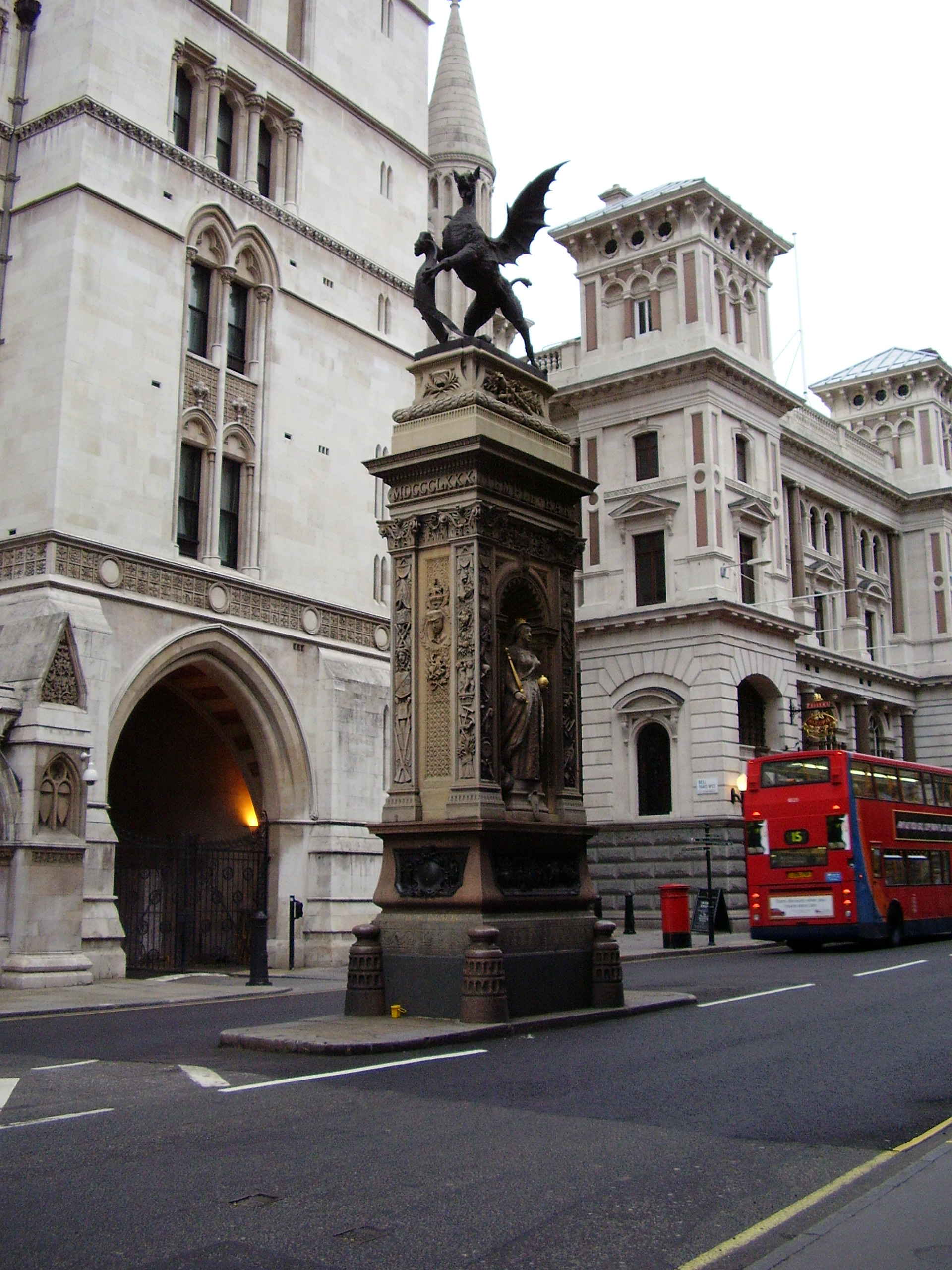
Behind the dragon is the Old Bank of England pub, where the main City Cogers meets each second Monday

- City of London Cogers, Ye Olde Cock Tavern, Fleet Street, 7pm, 2nd Monday each month. Near the Royal Courts of Justice and Chancery Lane.
- Westminster Cogers, The Plumbers Arms, Lower Belgrave Street, 7pm, 4th Wednesday each month. Just near Victoria Station.
- Ware Society of Cogers, The Drill Hall, Amwell End, Ware, 3rd Tuesday each month
- San Francisco Society of Cogers, The University Club, Nob Hill, 1st Tuesday each month.

== See also ==
- London Debating Societies
- Debating
- Free speech

== Related ==
- (United Kingdom) : Sylvan Debating Club
- (United Kingdom) : Cambridge Union Society
- (United Kingdom) : Oxford Union Society
- (United Kingdom) : The Durham Union Society
- (United Kingdom) : London School of Economics, Grimshaw International Relations Club
- (United States) : Yale Debate Association
- (United States) : Berkeley Forum
- (France) : Olivaint Conférence
- (Germany) : Studentenforum im Tönissteiner Kreis
- : Olivaint Conference of Belgium
