= Leicester Harmsworth =

British politician

Sir Leicester Harmsworth Bt

Member of Parliament for Caithness
- In office 1900–1918
- Preceded by: Gavin Brown Clark
- Succeeded by: Constituency abolished

Member of Parliament for Caithness and Sutherland
- In office 1918–1922
- Preceded by: Constituency established
- Succeeded by: Sir Archibald Sinclair

Personal details
- Born: 1 November 1870 Hampstead, London, England
- Died: 19 January 1937 (aged 66) Bexhill-on-Sea, East Sussex, England
- Resting place: St Marylebone Cemetery
- Party: Liberal
- Spouse: Annie Louisa (m. 1892)
- Children: 7
- Parents: Alfred Harmsworth (father); Geraldine Maffett (mother)
- Relatives: Cecil Harmsworth, 1st Baron Harmsworth (brother); Alfred Harmsworth, 1st Viscount Northcliffe (brother); Harold Harmsworth, 1st Viscount Rothermere (brother); Hildebrand Harmsworth, 1st Baronet (brother); St John Harmsworth (brother)
- Education: St Marylebone Grammar School
- Occupation: Businessman; politician; publisher

Sir Robert Leicester Harmsworth, 1st Baronet (1 November 1870 – 19 January 1937), was a British businessman and Liberal politician.

== Background ==
Harmsworth was the fourth son of Alfred Harmsworth, a barrister, and Geraldine Mary Maffett, daughter of William Maffet. He received his education at St Marylebone Grammar School. He was the brother of the 1st Viscount Northcliffe, the 1st Viscount Rothermere, the 1st Baron Harmsworth and Sir Hildebrand Harmsworth, 1st Baronet.

== Career ==
Harmsworth was a director of Amalgamated Press, the publishing company owned by his brother, Lord Northcliffe. In 1900 he was returned to Parliament for Caithness, a seat he held until 1918, and then represented Caithness and Sutherland between 1918 and 1922. In 1918 he was created a Baronet, of Moray Lodge in the Royal Borough of Kensington.

Harmsworth was an active member of the Sylvan Debating Club, which was founded by his father, and served as its Secretary.

== Family ==
Harmsworth married Annie Louisa, daughter of Thomas Scott, in 1892. They had four sons and three daughters. He died in January 1937, aged 66, and was succeeded in the baronetcy by his eldest son, Alfred. Lady Harmsworth died in December 1963.

== Library ==
A portion of his book collection is now owned by the Folger Shakespeare Library.

Parliament of the United Kingdom
Preceded by Gavin Brown Clark	Member of Parliament for Caithness; 1900–1918	Constituency abolished
New constituency	Member of Parliament for Caithness and Sutherland; 1918–1922	Succeeded by Sir Archibald Sinclair, Bt
Baronetage of the United Kingdom
New creation	Baronet of Moray Lodge; 1918–1937	Succeeded by Alfred Leicester St Barbe Harmsworth
