= Sir Hildebrand Harmsworth, 1st Baronet =

British newspaper proprietor (1872–1929)

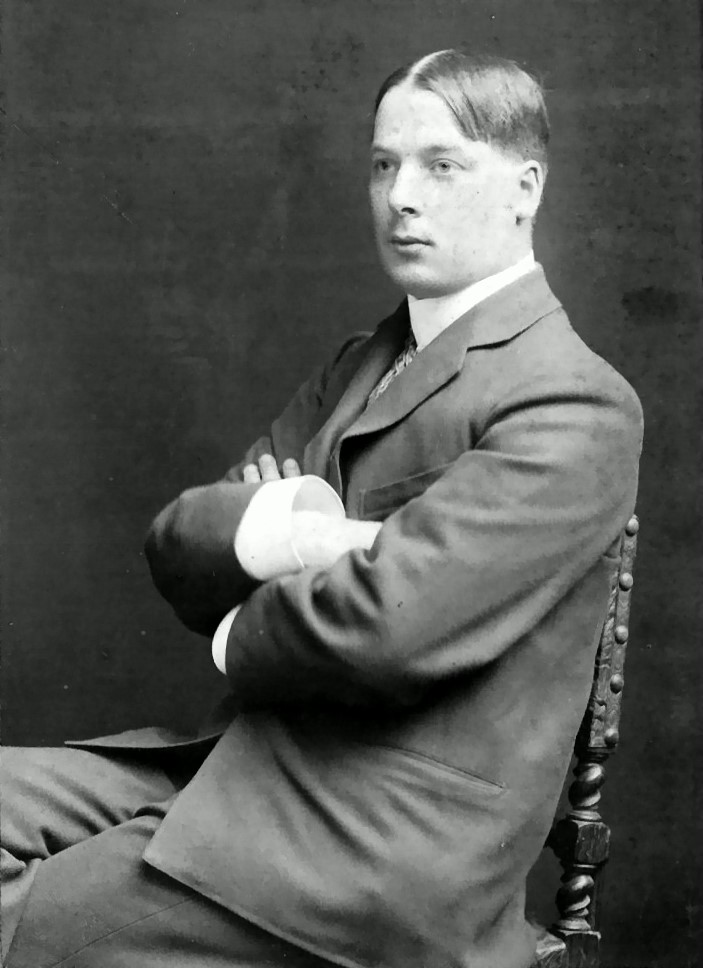
Hildebrand Harmsworth

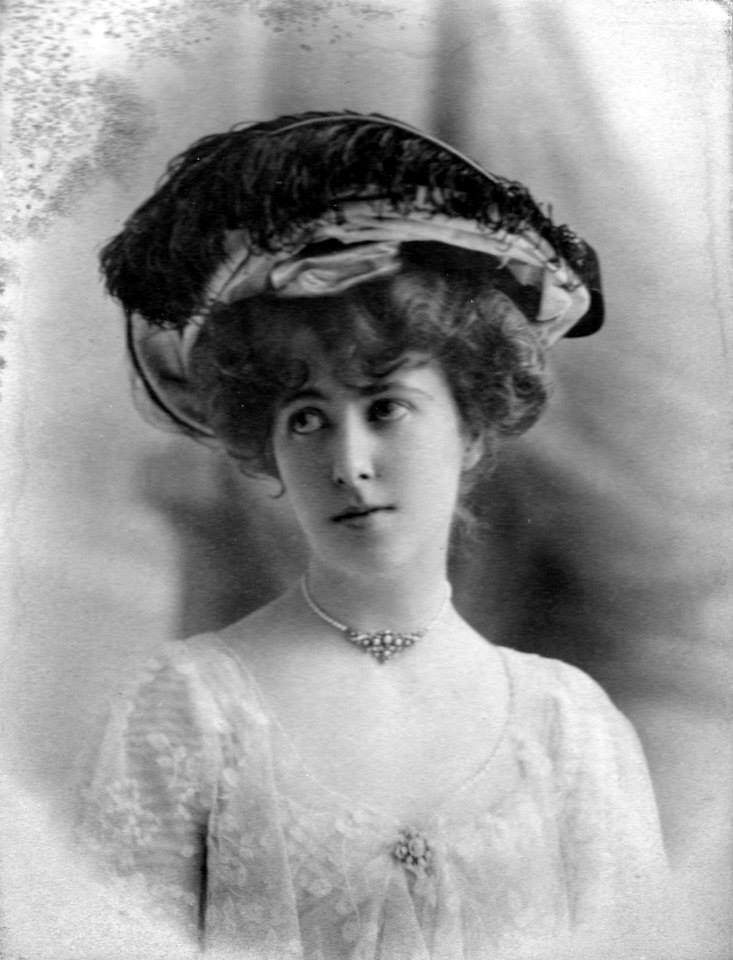
Kathleen Harmsworth, c. 1902

Sir Hildebrand Aubrey Harmsworth, 1st Baronet (15 March 1872 – 18 April 1929), was a British newspaper proprietor, twice unsuccessful parliamentary candidate, and member of the Harmsworth publishing family.

== Early life ==
Hildebrand Harmsworth was born on 15 March 1872, the fifth son of Alfred Harmsworth, a barrister, and Geraldine Maffett, daughter of William Maffett. He was the brother of Lord Northcliffe, Lord Rothermere, Lord Harmsworth, and Sir Leicester Harmsworth. He was educated privately and in 1892 went up to Merton College, Oxford, but did not stay to complete a degree.

== Political career ==
Harmsworth stood for the Parliamentary seat of Gravesend, Kent, in the British 1900 general election as a Liberal Imperialist but was not elected. He stood for the Wellington, Shropshire, seat as a tariff reformer and Liberal Unionist in the 1906 general election but was again unsuccessful, achieving 39% of the vote.

In April 1905, a boy was killed in a motor accident at Markyate, Hertfordshire, leading to demands in the Daily Mail that driving tests and certificates of competence be introduced, and the offer of a £100 reward to catch the "motor criminals". It soon transpired that the car involved in the accident, which did not stop, was owned by Hildebrand Harmsworth and driven by his Spanish chauffeur, Rocco Cornalbas. The passengers were two of his political supporters at Wellington. The chauffeur was charged with manslaughter and in June 1905 came to trial at the Hertfordshire Assizes before Mr. Justice Bray. He was found guilty and sentenced to a jail term of six months hard labour, while his passengers were censured for failing to insist that the car stop after the accident. Harmsworth gave £300 (equivalent to £31,538 in 2025) to a charitable fund to help the boy's mother.

== Publisher and editor ==
Harmsworth was the publisher of The Globe from 1908 to 1911 which he bought from the Armstrong family who had been represented by Sir George Armstrong as editor-in-chief. Waldon Peacock became the new editor under Harmsworth who proceeded to try to modernise the paper, aspects of which had not changed for 50 years.

Harmsworth was the joint editor of a short-lived monthly periodical, New Liberal Review with his brother Cecil Harmsworth, from its foundation in 1901 to its closure in 1904.

Described by David McKie as "famously useless", Harmsworth became a baronet in the 1922 Birthday Honours, one of a long and controversial list of honours proposed by David Lloyd George which eventually led to the Honours (Prevention of Abuses) Act 1925. On hearing the news, his family sent him a telegram with the sarcastic message "At last, a grateful nation has given you your due reward."

== Personal life ==
On 4 July 1900, Harmsworth married Kathleen Mary Berton, a daughter of E. Denny Berton, MB, CM. By the time of the 1911 United Kingdom census, they were living at First Avenue, Hove, East Sussex. They had four sons, Sir Hildebrand Harmsworth, 2nd Baronet (1901–1977), Ronald Aubrey Leicester Harmsworth (1902–1946), Chamberlain Michael Hildebrand Harmsworth (1903–1955), and Perceval Anthony Thomas Harmsworth (1907–1968). One of his grandsons was Hildebrand Harold Harmsworth, 3rd Baronet.

== Death and legacy ==
Harmsworth died aged 57 on 18 April 1929, of cirrhosis of the liver. He is buried in St Helen's churchyard, Hove, with his second son Ronald. He left a legacy to Merton College to be used to fund scholarships for postgraduate study.

== See also ==
- Baron Harmsworth

Baronetage of the United Kingdom
| New creation | Baronet of Freshwater Grove; 1922–1929 | Succeeded by Hildebrand Harmsworth |
