= Cecil Harmsworth, 1st Baron Harmsworth =

British politician (1869–1948)

The Right Honourable The Lord Harmsworth LLD
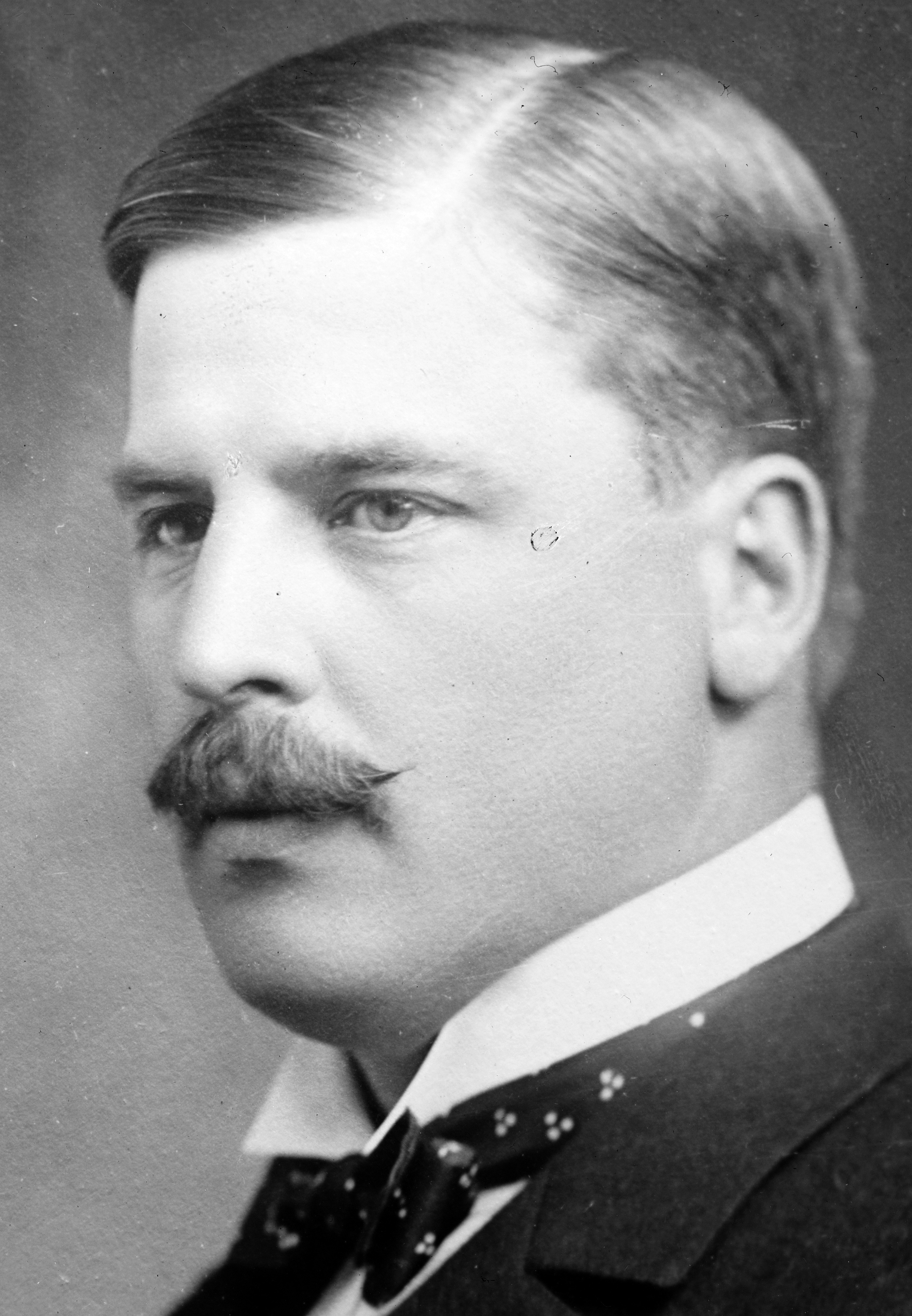

Under-Secretary of State for Foreign Affairs
- In office 10 January 1919 – 19 October 1922
- Prime Minister: David Lloyd George
- Preceded by: Robert Cecil
- Succeeded by: Ronald McNeill

Under-Secretary of State for the Home Department
- In office 4 February 1915 – 25 May 1915
- Prime Minister: H. H. Asquith
- Preceded by: Ellis Ellis-Griffith
- Succeeded by: William Brace

Member of Parliament for Luton
- In office 20 July 1911 – 15 November 1922
- Preceded by: Thomas Ashton
- Succeeded by: John Hewett

Member of Parliament for Droitwich
- In office 8 February 1906 – 10 February 1910
- Preceded by: Richard Martin
- Succeeded by: John Lyttelton

Personal details
- Born: Cecil Bisshopp Harmsworth; 23 September 1869 St John's Wood, London, UK
- Died: 13 August 1948 (aged 78)
- Party: Liberal (Before 1916, 1923–1948)
- Other political affiliations: Coalition Liberal (1916–1922); National Liberal (1922–1923)
- Spouse: Emilie Maffett (1873–1942)
- Parents: Alfred Harmsworth (father); Geraldine Maffett (mother)
- Relatives: Harold Harmsworth (brother); Alfred Harmsworth (brother); Leicester Harmsworth (brother); Hildebrand Harmsworth (brother); St John Harmsworth (brother)
- Education: Trinity College Dublin

Cecil Bisshopp Harmsworth, 1st Baron Harmsworth (23 September 1869 – 13 August 1948), was a British businessman and Liberal politician. He served as Under-Secretary of State for the Home Department in 1915 and as Under-Secretary of State for Foreign Affairs between 1919 and 1922.

== Early life and career ==
Harmsworth was born at Alexandra Terrace, St John's Wood, London, the third son of Alfred Harmsworth and Geraldine Maffett, daughter of William Maffett. He was the younger brother of newspaper proprietors Alfred Harmsworth, 1st Viscount Northcliffe, and Harold Harmsworth, 1st Viscount Rothermere, and the elder brother of Sir Leicester Harmsworth, 1st Baronet, and Sir Hildebrand Harmsworth, 1st Baronet. He also had four other younger brothers and four sisters. He was educated at St Marylebone Grammar School and Trinity College Dublin.

== Political career ==
Harmsworth was the Liberal candidate in the 1901 by-election for the North East Lanarkshire constituency, but lost to the Liberal Unionist candidate. He was elected to the House of Commons for Droitwich in 1906, a seat he held until he was defeated at the January 1910 general election. He re-entered the House of Commons as the representative for Luton in a 1911 by-election, and continued to sit for the constituency until 1922. He was Parliamentary Private Secretary to Walter Runciman between 1911 and 1915 and then briefly held office under H. H. Asquith as Under-Secretary of State for the Home Department between February and May 1915. However, he did not serve in the coalition government formed by Asquith in May 1915.

After David Lloyd George became Prime Minister in December 1916, Harmsworth was a member of the Prime Minister's Secretariat between 1917 and 1919 and Under-Secretary of State for Foreign Affairs between 1919 and 1922 in Lloyd George's coalition government. He also served briefly as Acting Minister of Blockade in 1919. In 1939 he was raised to the peerage as Baron Harmsworth, of Egham in the County of Surrey. He became a regular contributor in the House of Lords, making his last speech in June 1945.

== Personal life ==
Lord Harmsworth married his cousin Emilie Alberta, daughter of William Hamilton Maffett, in 1897.

Apart from his political career Harmsworth was a director of Amalgamated Press and chairman of Associated Newspapers, founded by his brother Lord Northcliffe. He published Pleasure and Problem in South Africa (1908), Immortals at First Hand (1933) and A Little Fishing Book (1942).

Harmsworth purchased Dr Johnson's House and restored it into a museum open to the public. He also was an active member of the Sylvan Debating Club, which was founded by his father, and served as its treasurer.

His diaries include social meetings with influential people including suffragists like Agnes Harben and her husband.

Emilie died in 1942. Lord Harmsworth survived her by six years and died in August 1948, aged 78. He was succeeded in the barony by his eldest surviving son, Cecil.

== Arms ==
Coat of arms of Cecil Harmsworth, 1st Baron Harmsworth
Crest A cubit arm erect the hand holding a roll of paper fesswise Proper between two ostrich feathers Or. Escutcheon Azure two rolls of paper in saltire Or banded in the centre Gules between two bees volant in pale and as many trefoils in fess of the second. Supporters On either side a deep-sea fisherman Proper. Motto Bene Qui Sedulo

Parliament of the United Kingdom
Preceded by Richard Biddulph Martin	Member of Parliament for Droitwich; 1906 – January 1910	Succeeded by John Lyttelton
Preceded by Thomas Gair Ashton	Member of Parliament for Luton; 1911–1922	Succeeded by Sir John Prescott Hewett
Political offices
Preceded by Ellis Ellis-Griffith	Under-Secretary of State for the Home Department; 1915	Succeeded by William Brace
Preceded by Lord Robert Cecil	Under-Secretary of State for Foreign Affairs; 1919–1922	Succeeded by Ronald McNeill
Peerage of the United Kingdom
New creation	Baron Harmsworth; 1939–1948	Succeeded by Cecil Desmond Bernard Harmsworth
