= Paul Dacre =

English journalist (born 1948)

- Born: Paul Michael Dacre; 14 November 1948 (age 77); Arnos Grove, Middlesex, England
- Education: University College School; University of Leeds
- Occupations: Journalist and newspaper editor
- Employer: Daily Mail and General Trust
- Known for: Editor-in-chief of DMG Media; Former editor of the Daily Mail
- Spouse: Kathleen Thomson
- Children: 2, including James Dacre
- Parent: Peter Dacre

Paul Michael Dacre (/ˈdeɪkər/; born 14 November 1948) is an English journalist and the former long-serving editor of the British tabloid the Daily Mail. He is also editor-in-chief of DMG Media, which publishes the Daily Mail, The Mail on Sunday, the free daily tabloid Metro, the MailOnline website, and other titles.

On 1 October 2018, Dacre became chairman and editor-in-chief of Associated Newspapers, and stood down as editor of the Daily Mail in the following month. He briefly left Associated Newspapers in November 2021, but rejoined just three weeks later following his withdrawal from the race to become Ofcom chairman.

== Early life ==
Dacre was born and grew up in the north London suburb of Arnos Grove in Enfield. His father, Peter, was a journalist on the Sunday Express whose work included show business features. Joan (née Hill), his mother, was a teacher; the couple had five sons, of whom Paul was the eldest. One of his brothers, Nigel, was editor of ITV's news programmes from 1995 to 2002.

Dacre was educated at University College School, an independent school in Hampstead, on a state scholarship, where he was head of house. In his school holidays, he worked as a messenger at the Sunday Express, and during his pre-university gap year as a trainee in the Daily Express. From 1967 he read English at the University of Leeds, while Jack Straw was president of the Students' Union.

While at university, he became involved with the Union News newspaper (the Leeds Student from 1970), rising to the position of editor. At this time he identified with the liberal end of the political spectrum on issues including gay rights and drug use, and wrote editorials in support of a student sit-in at Leeds organised by Straw. He introduced a pin-up feature in the newspaper called "Leeds Lovelies". He told the British Journalism Review in 2002: "If you don't have a left-wing period when you go to university, you should be shot" and said of his early experience of editing in November 2008 that it taught him "dull [content] doesn't sell newspapers. Boring doesn't pay the mortgage", but also that "sensation sells papers".

On his graduation in 1971, Dacre joined the Daily Express in Manchester for a six-month trial; after this he was given a full-time job on the Express. Concerning his career choice, Dacre commented in the BJR interview that he did not have "any desire to do anything other than journalism".

== Early career ==
At the Express, Dacre was based in Belfast for a few years before being sent to the office in London. He was sent to Washington, D.C., in 1976 to cover that year's American presidential election, remaining there until 1979, when he moved to New York as a correspondent. It was at this time that his politics shifted to the right:

I don't see how anybody can go to America, work there for six years and not be enthralled by the energy of the free market. America taught me the power of the free market, as opposed to the State, to improve the lives of the vast majority of ordinary people.

Following his years at the Express bureau, Dacre was head-hunted by David English, appointed as head of the Mail's New York bureau in 1979 and brought back to London in 1980. A profile in The Independent in 1992 recounted his behaviour in this period: "It was terrifying stuff. He would rampage through the newsroom with his arms flailing like a windmill, scratching himself manically as he fired himself up." Subsequently, he became assistant editor (news and features), assistant editor (features) in 1987, executive editor the following year and associate editor in 1989. In this period, according to former colleague Sue Douglas, Dacre was a "good David English disciple". Adrian Addison found opinions differed as to whether Dacre was an English protégé when he was conducting research for Mail Men.

During Dacre's brief period as editor of the Evening Standard from March 1991 to July the following year, circulation of the newspaper rose by 16%.

== Editor of the Daily Mail ==
=== Appointment ===
Dacre succeeded (the by then) Sir David English as editor of the Daily Mail in July 1992. Dacre had turned down an offer from Rupert Murdoch to edit The Times believing that Murdoch "would not accept my desire to edit with freedom". It was his approach to the job of editor, "hard-working, disciplined, confrontational" according to Roy Greenslade, which had led Murdoch to attempt to hire him. For the Mail, Dacre was considered important enough to necessitate sidelining someone thought unsackable; English became editor-in-chief and Chairman of Associated Newspapers, then the parent company.

Dacre was known in the summer of 1992 to be against Britain's membership of the European Exchange Rate Mechanism (this was shortly before Black Wednesday in September when Britain was forced out of the ERM) and the Maastricht Treaty. Several leaders in his last weeks at the Standard asserted that "Maastricht is dead" (on 10 June); "Unrealities in the EEC" (sic, 29 June); and an appeal to prime minister John Major, "Come on, John, gizzaballot" (30 June). In contrast, English was a Europhile and allowed more international content in the paper. Dacre apparently ceased publishing a page on World News and an American diary as soon as possible after he took over.

After English died in March 1998, Dacre himself was appointed by the 3rd Viscount Rothermere as the Mail Group's editor-in-chief the following July, in addition to remaining as editor of the Daily Mail.

=== Stephen Lawrence case ===
Dacre's most prominent newspaper campaign was in 1997, against the suspects who were acquitted of the murder in 1993 of the black teenager Stephen Lawrence. It "turned out to be one of the very rare instances in which the editor showed fellow-feeling", wrote Andrew O'Hagan. According to Nick Davies in Flat Earth News (2008), the paper originally intended an attack on the groups arguing for an inquiry into the Lawrence murder, but the paper's reporter Hal Austin, on interviewing Neville and Doreen Lawrence, realised that some years earlier, Neville had worked at Dacre's home in Islington as a plasterer, and the news desk instructed Austin to "Do something sympathetic" about the case. Dacre eventually used the headline "MURDERERS" accusing the suspects of the crime on 14 February 1997. He repeated this headline in 2006.

On the final day of the inquest held at the coroner's court, Dacre and other Mail executives had lunch with Sir Paul Condon, then Commissioner of the Metropolitan Police, "who very eloquently told me they were as guilty as sin". Four of the five suspects had never provided any alibi for their whereabouts on the night of Stephen Lawrence's murder and they invoked the privilege against self incrimination to avoid giving evidence and exposing themselves to cross examination. The police believed that the alibi of the fifth suspect was unconvincing. The newspaper on 14 February 1997, under its headline asserted: "The Mail accuses these men of killing. If we are wrong, let them sue us". No claim was issued and the newspaper received significant acclaim and opprobrium as a result. Two of the men featured on the Mail's "MURDERERS" front page were convicted of Stephen Lawrence's murder in January 2012.

Jonathan Freedland of The Guardian wrote of the development: "He made an unlikely anti-racist campaigner, but there were few voices more critical in the demand for justice for Stephen Lawrence than Paul Dacre and the Daily Mail." However, Brian Cathcart wrote in November 2017 that the paper's "principal claims" about its involvement in the case "are at best exaggerated and at worst unsupported by evidence."

On other occasions, the Mail under Dacre has been criticised for an alleged racist attitude towards the stories it chooses to cover. Nick Davies recounts an anecdote from a former senior news reporter who, en route to a murder scene of a woman and her two children 300 miles away, was told to return because the victims were black. Davies comments: "Perhaps I have been unlucky, but I have never come across a reporter from the Daily Mail who did not have some similar story, of black people being excluded from the paper because of their colour."

=== New Labour years ===
Dacre is "highly influential politically", in the opinion of the journalist Simon Heffer. For a while, the Daily Mail under Dacre briefly entertained positive views of New Labour until the Formula 1 tobacco advertising controversy and clashes with the government's Director of Communications Alastair Campbell cooled the relationship owing to the practice of spin doctoring. By 2001, according to the former Mail journalist (later the political editor) James Chapman, relations between Dacre and Tony Blair had completely broken down.

Dacre stated at a meeting of the Select Committee on Public Administration in 2004:

Politicians have always had a hostile press. ... I think [the Blair] government, through the Campbell approach, put that hostility on a different footing. I think after a while the media industry came to believe that it was disseminating untruths and misrepresenting the truth as a matter of course.

Dacre later wrote in 2013: "for years, while most of Fleet Street were in thrall to it, the Mail was the only paper to stand up to the malign propaganda machine of Tony Blair and his appalling henchman, Campbell".

As recounted by the academic and journalist John Lloyd in 2004, Campbell's assistant in Labour's first term, Tim Allan, believed "the government [spent] years trying to be chummy with the Daily Mail ... Blair sees himself as the great persuader, able to convince anyone. But they didn't want to like him. The government raised far too much time trying to turn the Mail around".

The newspaper also turned against Cherie Blair, the former Prime Minister's wife, when the Blairs' lawyers prevented the publication of a former nanny's memoirs; official regulations prevent press revelations regarding the children of public figures. The Daily Mail and Mail on Sunday also came into direct conflict with No. 10 in 2002 for their pursuit of Cherie Blair's connection to the conman Peter Foster, although Dacre denied any "agenda apart from good journalism". Tony Blair targeted the Mail titles directly, denouncing "parts of the media that will take what there is that is true and then turn it round into something that is a total distortion of the real truth".

According to Michael White, Dacre made contact with Gordon Brown around 2000 as the Mail editor's attitude towards Blair became more negative. In 2002, while Brown was Chancellor of the Exchequer, Dacre commented about his high admiration for him: "I feel he is one of the very few politicians of this administration who's touched by the mantle of greatness". Brown returned the favour at an event at the Savoy Hotel which celebrated the tenth anniversary of Dacre's editorship of the Mail in 2003. In a video presentation, Brown said that Dacre "has devised, developed and delivered one of the great newspaper success stories of any generation" and was "someone of great journalistic skill, an editor of great distinction and someone of very great personal warmth". Journalist Polly Toynbee referred to this relationship as an "incomprehensible and grovelling friendship" on the part of Brown with "Labour's worst enemy". In explanation, Peter Wilby thought both men were "puritans at heart". According to BBC News's political editor Nick Robinson, Dacre "was a guest at many of the most intimate family occasions Gordon Brown had". Campbell, however, has written that Brown in conversation always "adamantly denied" being a "personal friend" of Dacre.

Although he is a Eurosceptic, Dacre backed Kenneth Clarke, an advocate of the European Union, to be leader of the Conservative Party on two occasions. In what Anthony Barnett has described as "a gem of far-sightedness", a Mail editorial on the Conservative leadership candidates in 2005 got round this contradiction by arguing the campaign for Britain to switch to the Euro as its currency "has for the foreseeable future, been overtaken by events". While David Cameron was considered "attractive", although "insubstantial", and "too obsessed with aping Mr Blair", Clarke was "uniquely qualified to start a long overdue demolition job on" Labour's "shameful war record" in Iraq, Blair having "led Britain into an illegal war on the coat-tails of the Americans". It added "no one has dared accuse" Clarke "of not being a patriot".

Following the change of Labour prime minister in 2007, Brown commissioned an independent inquiry chaired by Dacre on the release of government information, which reported in late January 2009. It recommended the halving of the thirty-year rule in the remaining areas where it still applied. Dacre wrote: "the existing rule seemed to condone unnecessary secrecy rather than protecting necessary confidentiality. This perception of secrecy was breeding public cynicism".

Dacre said during a talk given to students in January 2007, that the Conservative Party could not be guaranteed the Mail's support at the 2010 general election, and he also queried whether the party was still conservative.

=== The editor and his newspaper ===
According to Cristina Odone, writing for The Observer, Dacre has a reputation towards underlings of "verbal abuse" and "a drill sergeant's delight in public humiliation". Nick Davies, in his book Flat Earth News, writes that Dacre's staff call his morning editorial meetings the "Vagina Monologues" because of his habit of calling everybody a "cunt". In his Desert Island Discs appearance in 2004, host Sue Lawley quizzed him on his methods, to which Dacre responded: "Shouting creates energy, energy creates great headlines." Conrad Black, a convicted fraudster and ex-proprietor of the Telegraph papers, considers him "a saturnine and capricious manipulator". Peter Wilby, in a January 2014 profile for the New Statesman, quoted an anonymous source, who said of Dacre: "He's no longer the expletive volcano he once was; his barbs these days tend to concern the brainpower of his target and their supposed laziness."

According to John Lloyd writing in April 2012, Dacre's newspaper "is a daily and brilliantly disciplined savaging of government follies, progressive fads and flouters of the time-honoured verities of British and family life". Dacre, he commented in 2007, is the only "British newspaper editor who stamps himself on his newspaper every morning" reflecting "his unique blend of libertarian-authoritarian Conservatism". According to Roy Greenslade in The Guardian: "The Mail is a rare national newspaper in that it is the embodiment of the values and views of its editor rather than its proprietor. It is very much Paul Dacre's paper. This is to the credit of" Jonathan Harmsworth, 4th Viscount Rothermere "in the sense that he allows the editor to hold sway".

Some years later, at the Leveson Inquiry in February 2012, Dacre rejected the idea that he imposes his will on the paper. He commented that some issues contain opinions which "make my hair go white" and asserted that some journalists "would resign if I told them what to write". Peter Preston noted: "He can hire leading voices from the Guardian or the Observer and let them say exactly what they'd have said in their old homes." The astrologer Jonathan Cainer was first taken on for a Mail horoscope column in December 1992. Given to an unconventional dress code Dacre found objectionable, his contract had a clause insisting he wore a suit. Cainer, who spent the bulk of his career at the Mail although he "never once agreed with an editorial they have published", was the highest paid journalist of his era.

Dacre told Lauren Collins for a 2012 article about the Mail in The New Yorker: "The family is the greatest institution on God's green earth." The typical locale of his readers, he told Collins, is the area of North London in which Dacre himself was raised, Arnos Grove: "Its inhabitants were frugal, reticent, utterly self-reliant, and immensely aspirational. They were also suspicious of progressive values, vulgarity of any kind, self-indulgence, pretentiousness, and people who know best".

These pretensions have sometimes received dismissive responses. Owen Jones in The Establishment (2014) wrote that Dacre "is the epitome of the privileged and powerful journalist who has convinced himself that he's the voice of the little man, the ordinary Brit". Stephen Fry in August 2013 said Dacre "decries indecency on one page and pushes his male readers" into looking at "a semi-nude actress on another. His cancer scare, miracle cure stories are sickeningly anti-science and the only good thing to be said about his Mail is that no one decent or educated believes in it".

Dacre defended himself against his critics in October 2013 decrying the existence of "an unpleasant intellectual snobbery about the Mail in leftish circles, for whom the word 'suburban' is an obscenity. They simply cannot comprehend how a paper that opposes the mindset they hold dear can be so successful and so loved by its millions of readers. Well, I'm proud that the Mail stands up for those readers".

Eight former national newspaper editors in 2003 considered "the secret of its success", according to Brian MacArthur in The Times, as being "Dacre's utter, old-fashioned professionalism". A MORI poll in 2005 asked 30 editors from the national and regional press and from the broadcasting industry for the name of the editor they most admired. Dacre won the poll. For Kelvin MacKenzie, the former editor of The Sun writing in 2005, he is "comfortably Britain's finest editor" who arrives at work "determined to crush the life out of his rivals".

Critics of Dacre, such as Brian Cathcart, have spoken of his "outstanding gifts as an editor". Peter Wilby considers the Mail "a technically brilliant paper".

=== Editorial issues ===
==== Allegations of prejudicial coverage ====
Andrew O'Hagan wrote in the London Review of Books in 2017 that Dacre's "worst effect" on the Mail "has been to let it seem mired in the things it hates, as if society's worst excesses were mostly an outgrowth of its own paranoid imagination". In his view, under its editor the paper is a "bubbling quagmire of prejudice posing as news, of opinion dressed as fact, and contempt posing as contempt for that portion of the world's population that doesn't live in Cheam". Polly Toynbee in 2004 commented "Read him out the first clause of the press code – the one that tells newspapers not to 'publish inaccurate, misleading or distorted material', and he replies with a straight face that the Mail obeys it".

Writing in The Independent in 2002, Simon O'Hagan stated: "As far as Dacre is concerned, women have no right to go out and earn money of their own, let alone rise to positions of power, when they also have a family". Journalist Rachel Johnson, writing in The Spectator in 2001, noted that photographs taken of women for the features pages of the Mail must comply with the 'Dacre Rules' which she considered a "patriarchal, sexist, trivialising treatment of women". Johnson quoted a female Mail photographer she had met while writing an article for the newspaper: "No jeans. No black [clothes]. No trousers. Paul Dacre only wants women to appear wearing dresses. If skirts, only to the knee". In 2007, Toynbee claimed the paper shares the opinions of Iran's President Ahmadinejad when it responded to his country's release of the hostage Faye Turney in April 2007. After attempting to buy her story, according to the Ministry of Defence, "with a very substantial sum", and Turney going elsewhere, the paper denounced her as an "unfit mother". "If you dare to take on the Mail you are a marked man (or woman)", wrote Roy Greenslade in 2013. "When the Mail has a target in its sights, the victims suffer", wrote Brian MacArthur in The Times over a decade earlier.

In 2005, the then Mayor of London, Ken Livingstone, long in conflict with the London Evening Standard, then wholly owned by the same media group as the Mail, branded the Mail titles as "the most reprehensibly edited" publications in the world with the Mail chosen as having most "disgraceful record". The Mail's treatment of asylum seekers and members of other vulnerable groups is a particular source of grievance for many critics, not only Livingstone. "Maybe we anti-racists have been naive to think that [the Stephen Lawrence campaign] was anything more than an aberration," suggests Yasmin Alibhai-Brown, adding: "wouldn't it be better if this extraordinary editor decided to use his influence to create just a little more understanding of why refugees leave their countries, and what most of them bring to our nation?"

==== Expenditure, revenue and circulation ====
Dacre pursued a strategy of appointing star columnists established at other newspapers at significantly raised salaries, including in 2006, Peter Oborne (for £200,000 per annum) and Tom Utley (for £120,000). Richard Littlejohn was then on £700,000 a year. Contractual problems sometimes broke into the open. Astrologer Jonathan Cainer, before his 2000–4 sojourn when he worked for other titles, was offered £1 million to stay with the Mail because he was thought vital to sustaining the paper's circulation over the Daily Express. This dispute led to a court case against Cainer which the Mail lost. Another legal entanglement came in 2005 with The Sun when the terms of Littlejohn's contract came into conflict with his obligations to his former newspaper. Dacre's appearance in the High Court was only averted by a few days. Like other titles, reductions in the editorial budget because of the decline in advertising revenue have resulted in staff redundancies.

From the business point of view, Dacre's time as editor was highly successful: "no editor can point to rises in sales that come anywhere near Dacre's in the [first] 10 years that he has been in the job", wrote Simon O'Hagan in 2002. In his first decade as editor of the Mail, circulation rose by 805,000 in a declining market for tabloid newspapers, although the rise in circulation was helped by the closure of the Today newspaper. Circulation peaked in 2003 with daily sales of 2.5 million copies, but by 2018 was down to 1.4 million. However, the Mail Group's website Mailonline has overtaken The New York Times as the English-language title with the largest reach. Although the website reprints content from the newspaper, as well as generating its own material, responsibility for it was delegated to Martin Clarke as Dacre does not use a computer. Dacre received a bonus of £263,388 (as revealed in the 2016 DGMT annual report) for his involvement in the company's consumer digital media.

On 24 May 2016, Lord Rothermere issued a company profit's warning to the city and the share price fell by almost 10%.

=== Public appearances ===
A shy man who is uneasy in company, according to former employee Helen Lewis, Dacre has a reputation for avoiding publicity and seldom gives interviews. He has a low opinion of "celebrity editors" such as the (then) editor of the Daily Mirror, Piers Morgan. Responding to comments on his more limited public visibility to a parliamentary select committee in 2004, he spoke of his peers who "think they are public figures and the more they become speaking heads on TV chat shows the more their newspapers decline and they do not last very long in their jobs".

The Cudlipp Lecture was delivered by Dacre at the London College of Communication on 22 January 2007. For him, Britain is dominated by a "subsidariat", those newspapers whose "journalism and values—invariably liberal, metropolitan and politically correct, and I include the pinkish Times here—don't connect with sufficient readers to be commercially viable" and make a profit. Dacre also attacked the BBC as a "monolith" pursuing "cultural Marxism" which has a singular world view and is contemptuous of "ordinary people". According to Dacre:

The right to disagree was axiomatic to classical liberalism, but the BBC's political correctness is, in fact, an ideology of rigid self-righteousness in which those who do not conform are ignored, silenced, or vilified as sexist, racist, fascist or judgmental. Thus, with this assault on reason, are whole areas of legitimate debate—in education, health, race relations and law and order—shut down, and the corporation, which glories in being open-minded, has become a closed-thought system operating a kind of Orwellian Newspeak."

Dacre was also critical of David Cameron, then just over a year into his leadership of the Conservative Party: "Today's Tories are obsessed by the BBC. They saw what its attack dogs did to [William] Hague, [Iain] Duncan Smith and [Michael] Howard. Cameron's cuddly blend of eco-politics and work/life balance, his embrace of Polly Toynbee, a columnist who loathes everything Conservatism stands for, but is a totemic figure to the BBC, his sidelining of Thatcherism and his banishing of all talk of lower taxes, lower immigration and euroscepticism are all part of the Tories' blood sacrifice to the BBC god." Greg Dyke, writing for The Independent, commented that when he was the BBC's Director General "we did a piece of research on the readership of the Daily Mail and found that they were more likely to appreciate and like the BBC than the public at large. In other words, he thinks his readers are all like him but they are not".

Martin Kettle, a columnist in The Guardian, questioned whether Dacre's assertion that the Mail represents Conservative voters can be sustained. Kettle wrote that in the 2005 general election 22% of Mail readers voted Labour, 14% for the Liberal Democrats and 7% for other non-Conservative candidates. "In this respect, therefore, the editor who claims to have a hotline to the national mood turns out to have something of a crossed line instead", Kettle wrote.

Dacre became chairman of the PCC's Editors' Code of Practice Committee in April 2008. On 9 November 2008, Dacre gave a speech to the Society of Editors Conference in Bristol in which he was critical of the emerging pressures for privacy laws following the conclusion of the Max Mosley libel case against the News of the World and Mr Justice Eady's closing remarks. According to Dacre, Eady had "effectively ruled that it was perfectly acceptable for" Mosley "to pay five women £2,500 to take part in acts of unimaginable sexual depravity with him" which is "the very abrogation of civilised behaviour of which the law is supposed to be the safeguard". Should the government want "to force a privacy law", the bill would need to go through the parliamentary stages, "withstand public scrutiny and win a series of votes", Dacre said. "Now, thanks to the wretched Human Rights Act, one judge with a subjective and highly relativist moral sense can do the same with a stroke of his pen". Referring to a case in 2006 where Eady had blocked the publication of a married man's account of his wife's seduction by a prominent figure involved in sport, Dacre said "the judge – in an unashamed reversal of centuries of moral and social thinking – placed the rights of the adulterer above society's age-old belief that adultery should be condemned". If newspapers, which "devote considerable space" to "public affairs, don't have the freedom to write about scandal, I doubt whether they will retain their mass circulations with the obvious worrying implications for the democratic process".

Peter Wilby wrote in The Guardian about another of his attacks on the BBC: "As Dacre well knows, the cutting edge of news – scandal, exposure, campaigning – is still largely a print monopoly. He demands greater restrictions on the BBC, fewer on his own industry". While Dacre said "it is the duty of the media to take an ethical stand", according to Wilby "his idea of ethics includes running stories that are, at best, distorted and, at worst, plain wrong". Nearly two years earlier, Wilby cited a MORI poll of Mail and Express readers suggesting they believed immigration was 20% of the British population, while the true figure then was about 7%.

Dacre and the PCC were criticised directly by Mosley in March 2009 at a meeting of the culture, media and sport committee at the House of Commons. but Dacre defended the newspaper industry's current system of self-regulation under the Press Complaints Commission (PCC) in his statement accompanying the annual report published in 2010. In April 2009, Dacre made a further appearance in front of the House of Commons CMSSC, where he criticised current libel laws and the fees charged by law firms. Justice Eady referred to Dacre's submission (by "the man from the Daily Mail") in December 2009 at a conference about privacy organised by Justice. "This ad hominem approach does absolutely nothing to further the debate", he said. Dacre had said this "one man is given a virtual monopoly of all cases against the media", which is "surely the greatest scandal". In his own later speech, Justice Eady asked for alternative proposals and said Dacre did not want any privacy law at all.

=== Leveson Inquiry ===
Dacre himself appeared on three occasions at the Leveson Inquiry, which had been set up by the Conservative Prime Minister, David Cameron. He gave a speech at a Leveson seminar concerning press standards on 12 October 2011. The BBC's Newsnight programme reported in January 2017 that Dacre refused to take David Cameron's telephone calls for months after the launch of the Leveson inquiry in 2011.

In his seminar delivered at the Leveson Inquiry, Dacre re-asserted his opinion that self-regulation "in a considerably beefed up form" remained "the only viable way of policing a genuinely free press". He was critical of Cameron ("too close to News International") who "in a pretty cynical act of political expediency has prejudiced the outcome of this inquiry by declaring that the" Press Complaints Commission, "an institution he'd been committed to only a few weeks previously, was a 'failed' body". Dacre claimed legislation passed in the last 20 years already helped stop necessary journalistic enquiry, and meant that the press was "already on the very cusp of being over regulated". After returning to his negative opinion of liberals, who "by and large hate all the popular press", he said "that Britain's commercially viable free press – because it is in hock to nobody – is the only really free media in this country." His advocacy of newspaper owners being legally unable to reject any regulatory body was viewed as a reference to Richard Desmond, whose Northern & Shell company owns the Daily Express, and had withdrawn from the PCC.

In his first cross-examination on 6 February, Dacre admitted that the Mail had used the private detective Steve Whittamore, who was jailed in 2005 for illegally accessing information, but claimed that the rest of the British press had done so too. Peter Wright, now a former editor of The Mail on Sunday, had said in his session that the Sunday paper continued using Whittamore for 18 months after his conviction, which Dacre effectively confirmed. Dacre said he banned the use of all "Whittamore inquiry agencies" in 2007. A suggestion from Dacre for a new "press card", to be supervised by a new body, received support from The Independent but was rejected by commentators and other interested parties.

The actor Hugh Grant had accused the Mail of using phone hacking to report on his private life, he told the Inquiry "voice messages on my mobile" could be the only source for a February 2007 Mail on Sunday article, although Dacre himself made "extensive enquiries" to establish his newspapers had not used phone hacking. John Lloyd in an April 2012 article for the Financial Times wrote that there was "no evidence that the Daily Mail journalists asked for phones to be hacked". Dacre accused Grant of indulging in a "mendacious smear" in a November 2011 statement for his comment about voice messages. Dacre refused to retract his response to Hugh Grant at both appearances at the hearings, unless Grant withdrew his statement. He was quickly recalled on this specific issue, and again on 9 February 2012, he rejected calls that he should retract his allegation that actor Hugh Grant lied.

DMGT had paid damages to Grant for a false February 2007 story in The Mail on Sunday, but Dacre accused Grant of being "obsessed with trying to drag the Daily Mail into another newspaper's scandal". Grant stood by his accusation in an interview on the Today radio programme on 11 February. In successive appearances at Leveson, Rupert Murdoch and then Dacre accused the other of having acting unethically in their respective business interests.

Dacre's Leveson appearances were described as being "defiant, disingenuous and in denial", by Kevin Marsh. "It was a chilling insight into a warped mindset", Marsh wrote in the book, The Phone Hacking Scandal: Journalism on Trial. In the final report, Dacre was criticised for his paper's coverage of several stories, including the articles about Grant. The "draconian inquiry", Dacre said of Leveson in a 2014 speech, was "a kind of show trial in which the industry was judged guilty and had to prove its innocence". His industry faced the "unremitting pressure of fighting what I have no doubt was a concerted attempt by the Liberal Establishment, in cahoots with Whitehall and the Judiciary, to break the only institution in Britain that is genuinely free of Government control – the commercially viable free press".

=== Ralph Miliband articles ===
In late September and October 2013, Dacre became the subject of criticism across the UK media and political spectrum after the Daily Mail published a piece on 28 September maligning Ralph Miliband, a deceased Marxist academic and father of Ed Miliband, the leader of the Labour opposition at the time. The original article, entitled "The Man Who Hated Britain", alleged that Ralph Miliband detested the country he and his father had fled to from Nazi-occupied Europe on the basis of a diary note written when he was sixteen and because of his left-wing views. Ed Miliband requested a right-of-reply piece to be published, which was granted but placed alongside a reprinting of the original article and an editorial criticising him for responding, while insisting that Ralph Miliband did hate Britain and that his son's ambition was to inflict his father's Marxism upon the country. Roy Greenslade thought "the decision to carry [Ed] Miliband's right of reply was ... possibly unprecedented" and implied "the Mail knew it had gone over the top" with its claims about Ralph Miliband.

The criticism of Ralph Miliband, and his son's response, came in the run-up to a possible agreement between the media and parliament over the findings of the Leveson inquiry, a point which was made in the Mail's editorial on the subject. The articles published by the Mail were criticised by publications including The Spectator and The Times, as well as by major figures in the Conservative Party. Both Prime Minister David Cameron and Deputy Prime Minister Nick Clegg empathised with Ed Miliband's response. Former Conservative Deputy Prime Minister Michael Heseltine condemned the Mail for demeaning the level of political debate, as did former Conservative cabinet minister John Moore, who had been taught by Ralph Miliband at the London School of Economics.

The article also brought Dacre's position as editor-in-chief of Associated Newspapers under scrutiny, with Roy Greenslade accusing him of poor decision making. Paul Dacre was given a right of reply by The Guardian a fortnight later: "As the week progressed and the hysteria increased, it became clear that this was no longer a story about an article on Mr Miliband's Marxist father but a full-scale war by the BBC and the left against the paper that is their most vocal critic".

=== Euroscepticism and post-Brexit ===
==== Allegations over David Cameron urging sacking ====
In early 2016, it has been reported on the BBC's Newsnight programme, prime minister David Cameron was worried the Eurosceptic stance of newspapers such as the Daily Mail in the run-up to the 2016 European Union membership referendum might affect the vote. According to a report by Emily Maitlis at the end of January 2017, Cameron attempted to have Dacre sacked.

Cameron is believed to have met Dacre on 2 February 2016 in the former's Downing Street flat in an attempt to persuade him to tone down the anti-EU stance of his newspaper, specifically urging Dacre to "cut him some slack", but the Mail editor rejected this approach. He told Cameron he had been a Eurosceptic for a quarter-century, and thought his readers were too. This was on the day on which the results of Cameron's recent renegotiation of Britain's membership of the EU were formally announced. The paper's headline that day anticipating the day's announcement, was "Is that it then, Mr Cameron?" and on 3 February, following the meeting, the paper described the renegotiation as the prime minister's "Great Delusion".

Subsequently, Cameron is believed to have contacted Dacre's boss, the proprietor Lord Rothermere, who is known to have favoured the 'remain' option in the referendum, to persuade him to sack Dacre. Dacre was reputedly "incandescent" in March 2016 when told by a Westminster source of Cameron's approach to Rothermere, and this strengthened his Brexit convictions. A spokesman for Cameron said the then prime minister "did not believe he could determine who edits the Daily Mail", but had sought to persuade Dacre and Rothermere over the EU membership vote. A spokesman for Rothermere refused to confirm or deny the story.

According to Andy Beckett in a late October 2016 Guardian article, "Dacre and his paper" were "lukewarm towards the metropolitan Cameron". A few months later, Ian Burrell in The Independent wrote that Dacre loathed Cameron, because of his dislike of his changes to the Conservatives. The Daily Mail, in 2015, serialised Call Me Dave, the unauthorised and unflattering biography of Cameron written by Michael Ashcroft and Isabel Oakeshott which contained the unverified "Piggate" claims.

==== EU membership referendum ====
In April 2016, Charles Moore wrote in The Spectator that the Daily Mail was covering the referendum campaign with "more anger than melancholy" with "bellowings of Eurosceptic rage from the great Paul Dacre". The Daily Mail backed the 'leave' option, or Brexit vote in the edition of 21 June, following an emphasis over the previous month on stories critical of immigration. On 22 June, a day before the referendum, it urged: "Lies. Greedy elites. Or a great future outside a broken, dying Europe. ... If You Believe in Britain, Vote Leave". The paper and its editor, according to David Bond in the Financial Times in July 2016, "have been leading the Eurosceptic charge against Brussels for two decades". In contrast, the editor of sister title The Mail on Sunday, Geordie Greig, backed the 'remain' option in the referendum, although Dacre is formally his superior.

A call in early August 2016 by Patience Wheatcroft, a former Daily Mail journalist, for a second referendum intended to reject the Brexit vote "led to her being monstered as a 'cheerleader for the moneyed Metropolitan elite'" by the newspaper, Alastair Campbell wrote. "One of the triumphs of the campaign was for Murdoch and Dacre, two of the wealthiest people journalism has ever produced, to portray anyone in favour of Remain as part of this Metropolitan elite". On 13 September, the day after the former prime minister resigned as the MP for Witney, the headline in the Mail was: "The crushing of David Cameron".

==== Support for Theresa May after the referendum ====
The Mail backed Theresa May as the candidate to succeed David Cameron as Prime Minister following his resignation after the referendum result was announced. Dacre and May had met shortly before she announced her leadership bid. More than a year before May became prime minister, Gaby Hinsliff wrote in a February 2015 Guardian article that "one reason she gets on so well with Daily Mail editor-in-chief Paul Dacre is that both prefer talking business to pleasure". Following May's announcement, the next day's front page of the Mail insisted "It must be Theresa" accompanied by an editorial "which bear's Dacre's hallmarks" (according to Anthony Barnett) commenting "what the country needs most is a solid and steady hand on the tiller". According to Hinsliff, Dacre considers May's unsuccessful leadership rival, Boris Johnson, as "morally reprehensible, because of his serial affairs, and fundamentally unserious". Despite this, Mail contributor Sarah Vine, in a leaked email, believed Dacre (and Rupert Murdoch) would back Johnson if her husband, Michael Gove, was also part of the same ticket. The Independent's John Rentoul also saw Gove as being Dacre and Murdoch's preference, but for Gove himself, "that is not a great pitch".

Following Theresa May's announcement at the 2016 Conservative Party conference that she would trigger Article 50 by March 2017, Barnett wrote in an article for openDemocracy about "the contemporary political philosophy" of which May "is the living incarnation of an ideology worked out over three decades in the pages of that paper" which he termed "Dacreism". According to Barnett, Dacre "wants to combine the conviction and clarity of Thatcherism with the inclusiveness of Churchillism. As a formula for appealing to middle-class readers nostalgic for the lost world of post-war greatness, yet fearful of anything that smacks of the collectivism of those years", his approach "became an astonishing formula for readers and advertisers". Dacre was the only media figure in May's first six months as PM to receive hospitality at No.10 in the form of a private dinner in October 2016.

In the period of political uncertainty following the Brexit vote, Roy Greenslade suggested that the Daily Mail's "savage" "full-frontal assault on ... anyone hopeful of upending the EU referendum vote for Brexit", though a reflection of the Mail's readership, was also a reflection of Dacre's worries that MPs might reverse or mitigate the vote. After the High Court ruled in R (Miller) v Secretary of State for Exiting the European Union in November 2016 that a bill must pass through Parliament in order for Britain to leave the European Union, the Mail on its front page described the three judges involved as being "Enemies of the People". The press, implicitly taken as targeting Dacre's Mail without naming the title, were criticised when the issue reached the UK's Supreme Court by the Court's President Lord Neuberger as "undermining the rule of law".

"With the referendum now behind us, they can have their cake and eat it", wrote Alastair Campbell in a February 2017 article about Dacre, by "taking the mickey out of a woman who raised the famous 'bent banana' issue on Question Time as the reason for her LEAVE vote, the same reporter having been one of the journalists responsible for spreading the lie in the first place". In April 2017, after the 2017 general election had been called, the Mail in a front-page headline urged: "Crush the Saboteurs". May, in an interview on the BBC Radio 4 Today programme, did not endorse this attitude.

== Later career ==
On 6 June 2018, it was announced that Dacre's period as editor of the Daily Mail would end in time for his 70th birthday in November 2018. At the beginning of October 2018, he would take up a new role as chairman of Associated Newspapers, which is part of the holding company DMGT (Daily Mail & General Trust). He has been editor-in-chief of Associated Newspapers since 1998 and would retain that title; he would, however, be giving up his seat on the board of the holding company "prior to the end of the financial year". In 2019, it was announced that Dacre would front a Channel 4 documentary called The World According to Paul Dacre, that would share "his unique insights into the events and people who defined the front page of his newspaper". The documentary was set to be released in early 2021.

The editor of The Mail on Sunday, Geordie Greig, was appointed to succeed Dacre the following day. Greig's appointment was reported as being a way of "detoxifying" the paper, and there was speculation its support for leaving the European Union might be toned down. Dacre wrote the following week's "Diary" column for The Spectator in which he insisted: "Support for Brexit is in the DNA of both the Daily Mail and, more pertinently, its readers. Any move to reverse this would be editorial and commercial suicide".

The end of Dacre's role as chairman of the PCC's Editors' Code of Practice Committee (which began in April 2008) was announced at the beginning of December 2016.

Dacre was a member of the Press Complaints Commission (PCC) from 1999 to 2008. He left the PCC in order to become chairman of the PCC's editors' code of practice committee from April 2008. His departure from the post was announced in early December 2016. In the British Press Awards, organised by the Society of Editors, Dacre's Daily Mail won the "Newspaper of the Year" category on six occasions, twice as often as any other title. In November 2021, Dacre resigned as chairman and editor-in-chief of Associated Newspapers. Three weeks after his resignation, he rejoined the company as editor-in-chief of DMG Media, having withdrawn his candidature to become the chairman of the UK's media regulator Ofcom.

== Application for chair of Ofcom ==
Ofcom deemed Dacre not acceptable as its chairman, but rather than appoint candidates whose neutrality had been accepted the government decided to re-interview all candidates. The Digital, Culture, Media and Sport Committee chair, Julian Knight a Conservative MP, said this was quite unreasonable and Dacre should be excluded from reapplying.

== Personal life ==
While he was a student at Leeds University, Dacre met his future wife, Kathleen, now a professor of drama studies. Both of their two sons attended Eton; James is a theatre director, while their other son is a businessman.

For many years, Dacre has been the highest-paid newspaper editor in Britain. In 2008, Dacre received £1.62 million in salary and cash payments, an increase from the £1.49 million of the previous year. According to the DMGT annual report for 2017, Dacre's total income from the group amounted to £2.37 million, including a salary of £1.45m and an additional £856,000 as part of the company's Long-Term Investment Plan (LTIP). His total DGMT remuneration increased by 56% over payments made during 2016. Dacre's pension scheme, which began in 1979 and is no longer paid into by the group, pays him £708,000 a year.

Dacre's London home is in Belgravia. His other residences include a large farm in Wadhurst, East Sussex, the 17,000-acre (69 km^{2}) Langwell Estate near Ullapool in the Scottish Highlands and a home in the British Virgin Islands.

Dacre has benefited from subsidies under the Common Agricultural Policy from the European Union. In 2014, he received £88,000 for the two holdings and under the exchange rate of late March 2016, he is believed to have received £460,000 since 2011.

Media offices
Preceded by John Leese	Evening Standard Editor; 1991–1992	Succeeded by Stewart Steven
Preceded by David English	Daily Mail Editor; 1992–2018	Succeeded by Geordie Greig
