= Viscountess Rothermere =

Viscountess Rothermere may refer to:

- Patricia Harmsworth, Viscountess Rothermere (née Matthews; 1929–1992) (1st wife of the 3rd Viscount)
- Maiko Jeong Shun Lee, Viscountess Rothermere (b. 1949) (2nd wife of the 3rd Viscount)
