= Ted Verity =

British journalist and newspaper editor

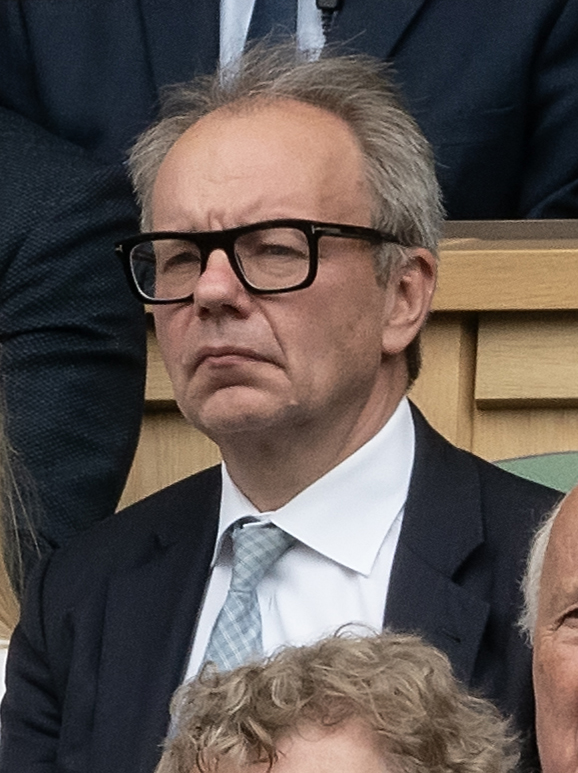
- Verity at the 2023 Wimbledon Championships
- Born: Edward Verity; 19 August 1965 (age 61)
- Education: Corpus Christi College, Oxford
- Occupation: Journalist
- Title: Editor of the Daily Mail
- Term: 2021–
- Predecessor: Geordie Greig
- Spouse: Joanne Hegarty
- Children: 1

Edward Verity (born 19 August 1965) is a British journalist. He has been editor of the Daily Mail since 2021. He was formerly editor of Mail newspapers, with responsibility for the Daily Mail, The Mail on Sunday and You magazine. Before that, he was editor of The Mail on Sunday.

== Education ==
Verity studied at Corpus Christi College, Oxford. He attended alongside the former Labour MP David Miliband, matriculating in 1984.

== Career ==
Verity began his journalism career at the Stoke Evening Sentinel, and in 1990 joined Associated Newspapers.

He began as a reporter, going on to run the showbusiness desk at the Daily Mail. He had a stint as the Daily Mail's royal correspondent. He moved to a role at Femail before moving to an executive function at MailOnline.

In 2004 he moved to Ireland to take on a role at the Irish Mail, becoming editor-in-chief, overseeing the launch of the Irish Daily Mail and the conversion of Ireland on Sunday to the Irish Mail on Sunday in 2006.

In 2008 he returned to London to become executive editor at The Mail on Sunday, serving as fourth in command and described as a "Dacre golden boy".

In June 2018, it was announced that Verity would succeed Geordie Greig, who would in turn succeed Paul Dacre as editor of the Daily Mail in November 2018. He edited his first edition of The Mail on Sunday on 9 September 2018, slightly earlier than initially expected.

In November 2020 Verity wrote a letter in The Guardian defending his title's coverage of Marcus Rashford, specifically a story which referred to the player's ownership of buy-to-let properties.

That same month, Private Eye reported that Verity's title had obtained images of Carrie Symonds "garbed in Roman attire with chums at a university ball". Symonds reportedly applied pressure on senior press figures to have the photos withdrawn from publication, but the photographs were only moved from the front page to a less prominent position after a direct intervention to Verity was made by the Prime Minister.

In 2021 the Daily Mail lost in a high court claim made by the Duchess of Sussex alleging misuse of private information in five articles that reported the contents of a letter written by her father, Thomas Markle. It was reported that Verity had taken the side of editor-in-chief Paul Dacre, in contrast to the views of then Daily Mail editor Geordie Greig who had told the paper's proprietor Lord Rothermere to settle the claim. The New European reported at the time that relations between Verity and Greig were "strained", though the Mail is now appealing the case.

In November 2021, Greig was "ousted" as editor and replaced by Verity, who began a new seven-day role as editor of Mail newspapers, with responsibility for the Daily Mail, The Mail on Sunday and You magazine.

In December 2021, David Dillon was confirmed as editor of The Mail on Sunday.

In 2023, the New Statesman named Verity as the 18th-most-powerful right-wing political figure in the UK.

== Personal life ==
Verity is married to Joanne Hegarty, who is from Cork and is a Daily Mail journalist. They became engaged in October 2010. Hegarty had been a Daily Mail gossip columnist since at least 2007. They have one son, and live in Wimbledon, London.

Media offices
Preceded by Geordie Greig	Editor of the Mail on Sunday; 2018–2021	Succeeded by Himself as editor of Mail newspapers
Preceded by Geordie Greig as editor of the Daily Mail; Himself as editor of The Mail on Sunday	Editor of Mail newspapers 2021	Succeeded by Himself as editor of the Daily Mail; David Dillon as editor of The Mail on Sunday
Preceded by Himself as editor of Mail newspapers	Editor of the Daily Mail; 2021–present	Incumbent
