= Jonathan Holborow =

British newspaper editor

Jonathan Holborow (born 12 October 1943) is a former British newspaper editor.

Holborow was educated at Charterhouse School before becoming a journalist at the Maidenhead Advertiser. He moved on to the Lincolnshire Echo, then the Lincoln Chronicle, before landing a job with the Daily Mail in 1967. In 1969, he was promoted to become the paper's Scottish news editor, then successively became its northern picture editor, northern news editor, deputy news editor, and news editor. In 1980, he left to become editor of the Cambrian News in Aberystwyth, but he returned to London two years later to become assistant editor of the new Mail on Sunday.

In 1986, Holborow became deputy editor of Today then, a year later, returned to the Daily Mail as associate editor, and in 1988 became deputy editor. In 1992, he was appointed as rditor of the Mail on Sunday. Under his editorship, circulation rose above two million per issue for the first time, although it also had to publish a front-page apology after printing an inaccurate story about Brooke Shields. Holborow left shortly afterwards, taking early retirement.

Holborow was then hired by William Hague as a part-time campaign consultant for the Conservative Party. From 2000 to 2002, he served on the Editorial Integrity Board of Express Newspapers. In 2004, he became Chairman of the Folkestone and Hythe Conservative Association.

Media offices
Preceded by New position	Deputy Editor of Today; 1986 – 1987	Succeeded by Amanda Platell
Preceded by Nicholas Gordon?	Deputy Editor of the Daily Mail; 1988 – 1992	Succeeded by ?
Preceded by Stewart Steven	Editor of the Mail on Sunday; 1992 – 1998	Succeeded by Peter Wright
