= Lynda Nead =

British curator and art historian

Lynda Nead FBA
- Occupation: Art Historian

Lynda Nead FBA is a British curator and art historian. Her work studies British art, media, culture and often focuses on gender.

She teaches courses on nineteenth and twentieth-century British art and culture, along with lectures on approaches to the History of Art. She has also contributed to a number of arts documentaries on the BBC, Channel 4 and Sky Arts and is a regular contributor to arts programmes on BBC Radio 4, such as Front Row and Free Thinking.

Her recent book, British Blonde: Women, Desire and the Image in Postwar Britain, centres on Ruth Ellis, Diana Dors and Barbara Windsor and includes material delivered as the Paul Mellon Lectures at the Victoria & Albert Museum and Yale University in 2023–2024 – it was published by Yale University Press for the Paul Mellon Centre on 9 September 2025. As of 2025 she is working on a book on the 1947 British film It Always Rains on Sunday, for the British Film Institute Film Classics series, published by Bloomsbury Press.

== Posts ==
She is currently the Pevsner Chair of the History of Art at Birkbeck, University of London and Visiting Professor of History of Art at The Courtauld Institute of Art. She has had a number of governance roles in British museums and art galleries, including Trustee of the Victoria & Albert Museum and is currently a Trustee of the Holburne Museum in Bath and of the Campaign for the Arts, a charity that champions widening access to the arts and culture.

In 2017, Nead was Moore Distinguished Professor at the California Institute of Technology; she has also been a Visiting Professor of History of Art at Gresham College and Pevsner Professor of History of Art at Birkbeck. In spring 2024 she was a "Fields of the Future" Research Fellow at the Bard Graduate Center in New York. Nead has been awarded a number of research grants such as an AHRC "Cultural Engagement" grant.

== Fellowships ==
- British Academy (FBA; also a Member of Council)
- The Royal Society of Arts (FRSA)
- The Royal Historical Society (FRHistS)
- The Academy of Europe (MAE)
- The Association for Art History (AAH; appointed 2021)
- Leverhulme Trust Major Research Fellowship

Leverhulme Research Fellowship

- Paul Mellon Centre for Studies in British Art Senior Research Fellowship

== Work ==
=== Books ===
She has published widely on the history of British art and culture and on gender, sexuality, the city and visual representation. Lynn's approach to visual images is interdisciplinary and intermedial; examining art in its historical and social contexts and in relation to other visual media in the period. She also has an interest in film as a research output and has collaborated with colleagues in the field on video essays arising from her recent research.

Marcia Pointon, in Art History, writes that Nead's analysis of women in Victorian imagery in her book, Myths of Sexuality: Representations of Women in Victorian Britain (1988), is based on the idea that sexuality and power are related to one another. Nead discusses a feminist history of the female nude in her book, The Female Nude (1992). Her survey covers representations of the female nude from Ancient Greece to the present. In her exploration of the subject, she also included studies on "vaginal imagery," "video pornography," and "visibility and the female body." In her book, she discusses the history of the female nude and how to decide where to draw the line between pornography and art. She also talks about how traditionally, the female nude "signifies the containment and disciplining of unruly female matter (and sexuality)," and also, how in a Kantian fashion, women's bodies represent a challenge of converting a troublesome nature into "pure art." Nead also discusses how feminist artists have resisted these traditions in various different ways. She further explores the use of women's bodies in art in her book about Chila Burman's work, Chila Kumari Burman: Beyond Two Cultures (1995).

In the art history book, Victorian Babylon (2000), Nead examines the gendered lives of people living in Victorian Era London between 1855 and 1870. Nead details different ways of living in urban London of the Victorian Era, looking at architecture and public spaces. She also examines maps, paintings, woodcuts and illustrations in the book. One chapter is devoted to maps of the sewer systems of London, for example, and how accurate maps helped create many of London's improvements. The Canadian Journal of History wrote that what Victorian Babylon "does best is to show how artists, cartoonists, illustrators represented" Victorian behavior. Art Journal describes her book as not only looking at behavior through art, but how things and people "circulate" throughout London during this time period. Art Journal also notes how Nead challenges the idea that women were "invisible" in Victorian England.

Within her art history book, 'the female nude: art, obscenity and sexuality, Nead explored female nudity within art and how this is associated with modern-day concepts of female body image. There is also a comparison between the portrayal of a female body and how this has been sexualized by the artists. Giving examples of work from artists such as Albrecht Durer whose depiction of the female body symbolises femininity and sexualisation. The book describes how the paintings of females in galleries have influenced our current ideal of the female body.

Nead's book, The Haunted Gallery: Painting, Photography, Film c. 1900 (2007), examines film in Britain in the early twentieth century. The book covers not just the art of film, but how the moving picture helped shape society's perceptions of topics as diverse as sexual imagery to astronomy. The book itself contains a "wealth of beautiful illustrations" which help explain the various topics she explores.

Nead's 2017 work, The Tiger in the Smoke, she explores post-World War II London in conjunction with an event that took place in December 1952, where Londoners were subjected to a "horrendous" five day long fog that kept thousands inside. Nead discusses art, media and history through this context.

=== Other ===
Lynn has supervised doctoral students in a range of subjects within British art and culture; thesis topics have included: "Whiteness, Sport and Visual Culture"; "Women Vorticists"; "Women and Photographic Albums in the Nineteenth Century"; "Masculinity, the Body and Visual Culture in Nineteenth-Century America"; "The Image of the Cashmere Shawl in Victorian Art and Culture"; and "Spiritualism and the Art of James Tissot".

In 2016 Lynn was guest curator for 'The Fallen Woman', a multimedia exhibition at the Foundling Museum, which was supported by Cockayne – Grants for the Arts, the Idlewood Trust and the Art Fund Crowdfunding site, amongst others. It focused on the Victorian trope of the "fallen woman" who face difficult, morally ambiguous choices in society. Many of the "fallen women" were unmarried, single mothers who were often forced to give up their children to Foundling hospitals. Nead collected stories and art to create the exhibit.

== Selected bibliography ==
- Myths of Sexuality: Representations of Women in Victorian Britain. Oxford: Basil Blackwell. 1988. ISBN 9780631155027.
- The Female Nude: Art, Obscenity and Sexuality. London: Routledge. 1995. ISBN 9780415026789. (reissued in 2024 as a Routledge Classic)
- Chila Kumari Burman: Beyond Two Cultures. London: Kala Press. 1995. ISBN 9780947753078.
- Law and the Image: The Authority of Art and the Aesthetics of Law. As editor, with Costas Douzinas. Chicago: University of Chicago Press. 1999. ISBN 9780226569543.
- Victorian Babylon: People, Streets and Images in Nineteenth-Century London. New Haven: Yale University Press. 2000. ISBN 9780300085051.
- The Haunted Gallery: Painting, Photography, Film c. 1900. New Haven: Yale University Press. 2007. ISBN 9780300112917.
- The Tiger in the Smoke: Art and Culture in Post-War Britain. New Haven: Yale University Press. 2017. ISBN 9780300214604.
