= Jonathan Harmsworth, 4th Viscount Rothermere =

British peer and owner of the Daily Mail (b. 1967)

The Right Honourable The Viscount Rothermere

Member of the House of Lords
- Lord Temporal
- In office 1 September 1998 – 11 November 1999 as a hereditary peer
- Preceded by: The 3rd Viscount Rothermere
- Succeeded by: Seat abolished (Note: Pursuant to the House of Lords Act 1999.)

Personal details
- Born: Jonathan Harold Esmond Vere Harmsworth; 3 December 1967 (age 58) Hammersmith, London, England
- Spouse: Claudia Caroline Clemence (m. 1993)
- Children: 6
- Parents: Vere Harmsworth, 3rd Viscount Rothermere; Patricia Matthews
- Education: Gordonstoun School
- Alma mater: Duke University
- Occupation: Publisher, media proprietor

Jonathan Harold Esmond Vere Harmsworth, 4th Viscount Rothermere (born 3 December 1967), is a British hereditary peer and media proprietor who serves as chairman of Daily Mail and General Trust (DMGT), the media conglomerate that publishes the Daily Mail, Mail on Sunday, i, and Metro, among other assets. He inherited the viscountcy and controlling interest in DMGT following the death of his father, Vere Harmsworth, 3rd Viscount Rothermere, in 1998.

As the great-grandson of Harold Harmsworth, 1st Viscount Rothermere, who co-founded the Daily Mail with his brother Alfred, 1st Viscount Northcliffe, Rothermere represents the fourth generation of the Harmsworth family to lead the media empire. Under his chairmanship, DMGT underwent significant restructuring, divesting non-core assets and focusing on consumer media. In 2021, he orchestrated the privatisation of DMGT, acquiring all outstanding public shares for approximately £1.6 billion and delisting the company from the London Stock Exchange after 90 years of public trading.

== Early life and education ==
Jonathan Harmsworth was born on 3 December 1967 in Hammersmith, London, the eldest son of Vere Harmsworth, 3rd Viscount Rothermere and Patricia Evelyn Beverley Matthews. He was educated at Gordonstoun School in Scotland, the same institution attended by members of the British royal family. He subsequently attended Duke University in the United States, where he studied history.

== Career ==
=== Early career at Associated Newspapers ===
Following his education, Harmsworth joined the family business, Associated Newspapers, a subsidiary of DMGT. He progressed through various operational roles within the organization, including positions at regional newspapers and corporate management. In the early 1990s, he was appointed managing director of the Evening Standard, then owned by DMGT, gaining experience in newspaper management ahead of his eventual assumption of group leadership.

=== Succession as chairman (1998) ===
On 1 September 1998, Vere Harmsworth suffered a fatal heart attack at age 73 while dining with his son at the family home in France. Jonathan Harmsworth immediately succeeded his father as 4th Viscount Rothermere and chairman of DMGT, assuming control of the media conglomerate just before his 31st birthday.

At the time of succession, DMGT was a diversified media company with significant interests in newspapers, business information, and risk management services. The relatively young chairman faced the challenge of leading a major media company through an increasingly competitive landscape marked by declining print circulations and rising digital pressures.

One of Rothermere's early governance reforms was instituting a mandatory retirement age of 75 for directors, intended to refresh the company's leadership structure.

=== House of Lords ===
Upon inheriting his viscountcy, Rothermere was entitled to sit in the House of Lords as a hereditary peer. He served as a Lord Temporal from 1 September 1998 until 11 November 1999, when most hereditary peers lost their automatic right to sit in the chamber following the passage of the House of Lords Act 1999.

=== Business strategy and DMGT transformation ===
==== Digital expansion ====
Under Rothermere's leadership, DMGT embraced digital transformation. The launch of Mail Online in 2003 proved particularly successful, with the website growing to become one of the world's most-visited English-language news sites. By the late 2010s, Mail Online was attracting significant global traffic, representing a strategic counterbalance to declining newspaper readership.

==== Asset disposals and focus ====
Beginning in the 2010s, DMGT pursued a strategy of divesting non-core businesses to concentrate on consumer media. The company sold interests in various divisions including Hobsons, Genscape, and Zoopla, collectively raising approximately £1.2 billion. In September 2021, DMGT completed the sale of its insurance intelligence division, Risk Management Solutions (RMS), for £1.4 billion, marking a major restructuring of the group.

In the consumer media sphere, DMGT made strategic acquisitions including the i newspaper in 2019 for £49.6 million and New Scientist magazine in 2021 for £70 million, consolidating its position in quality publishing.

==== Privatisation of DMGT (2021–2022) ====
In July 2021, Rothermere announced his intention to take DMGT private through his family investment vehicle, Rothermere Continuation Limited (RCL). The proposal, contingent on the sale of RMS and the listing of online car retailer Cazoo (in which DMGT held a 20% stake), offered 251 pence per share initially, later increased to 270 pence per share.

The offer also included a special dividend of 568 pence per share from the RMS sale proceeds and Cazoo shares, bringing the total value to approximately 1,278 pence per share—representing a 21% premium on the pre-announcement share price. The deal valued the company at approximately £850 million in cash terms, though the total package to shareholders exceeded £3 billion including the special dividend.

Some minority shareholders criticized the offer as undervaluing the company, citing information asymmetry between family and non-family shareholders. However, Nick Train of Lindsell Train, the largest non-family shareholder with approximately 13% of DMGT, publicly supported the bid, describing the company as "clearly very undervalued by other investors".

The privatisation received approval from shareholders in December 2021. As part of the transaction, Rothermere agreed to inject £412 million into the company's pension schemes. DMGT was formally delisted from the London Stock Exchange in January 2022, ending 90 years of public trading since its initial listing in 1932.

Rothermere stated that privatisation would provide strategic flexibility and allow the company to focus on long-term value creation.

==== Leadership restructuring ====
Following the completion of the privatisation, Rothermere briefly assumed the role of chief executive of dmg media (DMGT's consumer media division) in addition to his chairmanship. In March 2023, Tim Collier was appointed CEO of DMGT, allowing Rothermere to focus on broader strategic oversight.

In 2023, Rothermere's eldest son, Vere Richard Jonathan Harold Harmsworth, who had joined the company in 2020, was appointed Director of Publishing Strategy for dmg media, continuing the family tradition of involvement in the business.

== Editorial policy and political influence ==
=== Non-interference doctrine ===
Rothermere has maintained a policy of non-interference in editorial operations. In testimony before the Leveson Inquiry in 2012, he stated that he does not "operationally manage" DMGT and avoids involvement in day-to-day content decisions.

This hands-off approach was exemplified by his long working relationship with Paul Dacre, who served as editor of the Daily Mail from 1992 to 2018.

=== Brexit and political pressure ===
In January 2017, the BBC's Newsnight programme reported that Prime Minister David Cameron had approached Rothermere in early 2016, requesting that he dismiss Dacre due to the Daily Mail's Eurosceptic stance ahead of the EU membership referendum. A spokesman for Cameron confirmed that the then-prime minister had attempted to persuade both Dacre and Rothermere regarding the EU vote.

Rothermere's representative told the media: "Over the years, Lord Rothermere has been leant on by more than one prime minister to remove Associated Newspapers' editors but, as he told Lord Justice Leveson on oath, he does not interfere with the editorial policies of his papers".

He was a supporter of the Conservative Party leader David Cameron.

== Tax status and residency ==
Rothermere has non-domiciled status in the United Kingdom and owns his media businesses through a complex structure of offshore holdings and trusts.

According to the International Business Times, Rothermere acquired France as his "domicile of birth" upon his birth, as his father had acquired a French "domicile of choice" by becoming a tax exile in Paris.

In 2013, Private Eye reported that the non-dom status could be in doubt because of his stately home, Ferne House in Wiltshire, and status as a Freeman of the City of London.

== Wealth ==
Rothermere ranked fourth in the Publishing, Advertising, and PR section of the Sunday Times Rich List of 2013 with an estimated wealth of £720 million. In April 2015, The Sunday Times estimated his net worth at £1 billion.

His wealth derives primarily from his controlling stake in DMGT and its media assets.

== Philanthropy and public service ==
=== Imperial War Museum Foundation ===
Lord Rothermere chairs the Imperial War Museum foundation, following the tradition set by his great-grandfather, the first Viscount. The foundation was established in August 2009 with the goal of raising funds to support the redevelopment of Imperial War Museum London's permanent galleries.

In December 2010, plans were announced to redevelop IWM London's First World War gallery in time for the conflict's centenary in 2014. Prince William, Duke of Cambridge became the foundation's patron. The £40 million redevelopment, designed by Foster and Partners, opened in 2014.

== Personal life ==
Rothermere married Claudia DeVriese (later Claudia Caroline Clemence), daughter of Terence J. Clemence, on 15 July 1993. They have five children:

- Hon Vere Richard Jonathan Harold Harmsworth (born 20 October 1994), heir apparent to the viscountcy.
- Hon Eleanor Patricia Margaret Harmsworth (born 17 October 1996)
- Hon Theodora Mairi Ferne Harmsworth (born 9 July 2001)
- Hon Iris Geraldine Lilian Harmsworth (born 6 January 2004)
- Hon Alfred Northcliffe St John Harmsworth (born 20 May 2010)

In 2002, The Guardian reported that Rothermere had fathered at least one more child prior to his marriage. Rothermere confirmed this in his testimony to the Leveson Inquiry, stating: "He seemed to think the fact that I have an illegitimate son is of some concern. In fact, my son—I'm very proud of my son, he's a member of my family, we go on holiday together and my children are very proud to call him their brother, so I don't make a secret of it and frankly the idea that I'm offended by it is slightly offensive."

The family seat is Ferne House, near Donhead St Andrew, Wiltshire.

== Notes ==
Peerage of the United Kingdom
Preceded by Vere Harmsworth	Viscount Rothermere; 1998–present Member of the House of Lords (1998–1999)	Incumbent; Heir apparent: Hon. Vere Harmsworth
Preceded by Vere Harmsworth	Baron Rothermere; 1998–present	Incumbent; Heir apparent: Hon. Vere Harmsworth
Baronetage of the United Kingdom
Preceded by Vere Harmsworth	Baronet of Horsey; 1998–present	Incumbent; Heir apparent: Hon. Vere Harmsworth
