= David Dillon =

David Dillon may refer to:

- David Dillon (businessman) (born 1951), American businessman
- David Dillon (journalist), British journalist
