= David Dillon (journalist) =

British journalist

David Dillon is a British journalist who has been the editor of The Mail on Sunday newspaper since December 2021.

== Career ==
He previously worked on the Daily Express, before starting at The Mail on Sunday in 2001. There, he worked as news editor for several years, before being promoted to executive editor and deputy editor. In the early 2010s, he worked on the story concerning the then secretary of state for energy and climate change, Chris Huhne, swapping speeding points with his then wife Vicky Pryce; both were later jailed.

Dillon was appointed as the editor of The Mail on Sunday in late 2021 when Ted Verity was promoted to become editor of its sister paper, the Daily Mail, after Geordie Greig left the post. His appointment was not announced at the time, and Dillon is known for never having given a press interview and not having any profile on social media.

In April 2022, he faced criticism over the newspaper's allegations that the deputy leader of the Opposition, Angela Rayner, had tried to distract Boris Johnson in the House of Commons by crossing and uncrossing her legs. The Independent Press Standards Organisation reported that it had received 5,500 complaints about the article and was exploring possible breaches of its code of practice. The speaker of the House, Lindsay Hoyle, asked Dillon to attend a meeting to discuss the report. Dillon initially agreed to meet but later refused, saying that journalists should not "have to take instruction from officials of the House of Commons, however august they may be, on what they can report and not report."

Media offices
Preceded by Ted Verity as editor of Mail newspapers	Editor of The Mail on Sunday; 2021–present	Incumbent
