= Ireland on Sunday =

- Type: Sunday newspaper
- Format: Broadsheet, then tabloid
- Owner(s): Associated Newspapers
- Founded: 1997 (replaced The Title)
- Political alignment: Populist; Irish nationalism
- Ceased publication: 2006 (became Irish Mail on Sunday)

Ireland on Sunday was a national Sunday newspaper published in Ireland from September 1997 until September 2006, when it was renamed the Irish Mail on Sunday. The newspaper was founded in 1996 as a sports-only newspaper called The Title, but was soon expanded into a general broadsheet Sunday newspaper with its founder, former County Meath Gaelic football player Liam Hayes, carrying on as editor. The paper was considered a 'middle-market' publication.

== History ==
The Title was founded in 1996 by journalists Liam Hayes and Cathal Dervan. Hayes, a former captain of the Meath Gaelic football team who made five All-Ireland final appearances, had worked with Dervan at the Meath Chronicle before spending seven years at the Sunday Press, a national newspaper which folded in 1995. The Title focused exclusively on sports, covering events from local to international in scale. The newspaper attracted a niche audience, garnering a circulation of 29,000.

On 21 September 1997, the publication was relaunched as Ireland on Sunday, a three-section, full-colour broadsheet newspaper incorporating The Title as its tabloid-format sports section. The venture was backed by a consortium of Irish and Irish-American investors, headed by the property developer Paschal Taggart. The consortium invested a total of £4m, with £1.5m being spent on aggressive marketing in the first year. The paper sought to capture some of the former readers of the Sunday Press, which had a circulation of 150,000 before its demise. Hayes said before launch that Ireland on Sunday aimed to "reflect the thoughts, the values and the desires of a 32-county Ireland".

The newspaper met with success and the first issue's run of 120,000 sold out. Circulation settling at 66,863 by March 1998, well above its launch-day estimate of 40,000 within two years. However, financial difficulties forced Hayes to remortgage his house and ask the company's directors for €50,800 each to keep the title afloat. In July 2000, Ireland on Sunday was sold to Scottish Radio Holdings for approximately €10.16 million, with Hayes remaining in place as editor. However, in December of that year, he resigned from his post, to be replaced by former Evening Herald editor Paul Drury.

In July 2001 it was announced that Associated Newspapers, the national newspaper arm of the Daily Mail and General Trust, had bought Ireland on Sunday from Scottish Radio Holdings for £7.4 million. The stated circulation of the newspaper from January to June 2001 was 53,051. The Daily Mail publisher embarked on a campaign to reposition the middle-market title, slashing its cover price to 50c and bringing its design in line with the British Mail on Sunday. Its editor during this period, former Scotsman editor Martin Clarke, was accused of anglicising the formerly Irish nationalist title.

On 21 September 2006, DMGT announced that the previous weekend's edition of Ireland on Sunday had been the last under that masthead, completing its transition to becoming the Irish Mail on Sunday. The newspaper was already informally considered to be the Irish edition of the Mail on Sunday and used a variation of that newspaper's masthead and editorial style, but DMGT's move made that transition complete. The UK edition of the Mail on Sunday was withdrawn from the Irish market in line with this.

== Editorial line ==
IoS (as it was nicknamed) was aimed at the traditional Irish nationalist readers who had read The Sunday Press, leading it to adopt an Irish nationalist slant. It sold more copies in Northern Ireland (11,000–12,000) per week than any other Dublin-based weekly newspaper. Founding editor Liam Hayes said that its tone was intended to be "humorous, provocative and responsible". The paper's columnists included nationalist historian Tim Pat Coogan and publisher of the New York-based Irish Voice Niall O'Dowd. It attracted controversy on several occasions, clashing with Taoiseach Bertie Ahern over invasion of privacy and supporting swimmer Michelle Smith long after other newspapers had turned against her over allegations of doping.
