= Campaign for the Arts =

UK charity

- Formation: 2022
- Merger of: National Campaign for the Arts (1985-2022); Public Campaign for the Arts (2020-2022)
- Type: Charity
- Purpose: Advancement of the arts and culture
- Region served: United Kingdom
- Key people: Jack Gamble (Director and CEO); Dave Edwards FRAeS (Trustee); Jack Haynes (Trustee); Rosie Luff (Trustee); Kadiatu Kanneh-Mason (Trustee); Lynda Nead FBA (Trustee); Savannah Stanislaus (Trustee); Estelle van Warmelo (Trustee); Sir Stephen Waley-Cohen (Trustee); Samuel West (Trustee)
- Website: www.campaignforthearts.org

The Campaign for the Arts (CFTA) is a charitable organisation in the United Kingdom. It works to champion, defend and expand access to the arts and culture, for and with the public. It has over 250,000 registered supporters nationwide.

== Activities ==
The Campaign for the Arts aims to create projects, initiatives and well-researched information to inform people, express the value of the arts to contemporary society, and ensure that everyone in the UK has opportunities to experience and participate in the arts.

=== Research and analysis ===
The Campaign for the Arts monitors and reports on the health of the arts in society. In 2024 it published a landmark report with the University of Warwick entitled The State of the Arts.

=== Hearts for the Arts awards ===
The Campaign for the Arts delivers the Hearts for the Arts awards, recognising excellence in local authority support for the arts and culture.

=== Arts Map ===
The Campaign for the Arts is developing a digital map of the UK’s arts and cultural organisations, called the Arts Map.

== History ==
The Campaign for the Arts launched on 24 October 2022. It was formed by the merger of the National Campaign for the Arts (NCA) and Public Campaign for the Arts (PCA).

=== Background ===
In 1983, the UK Government published a white paper proposing the abolition of the Greater London Council (GLC) and six top-tier Metropolitan County Councils (MCCs). Arts figures warned that the changes "would radically alter the structures and levels of arts funding" and "could have irreparable consequences on the artistic life of this country".

Representatives from more than 600 arts organisations assembled at The Old Vic in London on 11 December 1983, to prepare a "collective and independent response" and to "back the creation of a National Lobby for the Arts". The meeting was chaired by Joan Bakewell, and speakers included Tony Banks, George Tremlett and Peter Hall.

In June 1984, the National Lobby for the Arts (NLFA) formed a joint executive committee with the nascent advocacy group British Arts Voice (BRAVO). The two organisations approved a merger in November 1984 to form the National Campaign for the Arts.

=== National Campaign for the Arts ===
The National Campaign for the Arts (NCA) was launched in London on 12 March 1985. Its first Director was Simon Crine, and its President was Melvyn Bragg.

It was initially funded by six Founder Members: the Association of British Orchestras, the British Actors' Equity Association, the Broadcasting and Entertainment Trades Alliance, the Musicians' Union, the Society of West End Theatre and the Theatrical Management Association.

The NCA’s first campaign was to urge local councils to maintain cultural funding.

==== Directors of the NCA ====
1. Simon Crine (1985-1990)
2. Simon Mundy (1990-1993)
3. Jennifer Edwards (1993-1998)
4. Victoria Todd (1998-2006)
5. Louise de Winter (2006-2011)
6. Selina Mehra (Acting Director, 2011-2012)
7. Laura Willoughby (Interim Director, 2012)

==== Chairs of the NCA ====
1. Stephen Remington (1985-1988)
2. David Pratley (1988-1992)
3. Richard Pulford (1992-1996)
4. Stewart Steven (1996-2004)
5. Joan Bakewell (2004-2010)
6. Kate Adie (2010-2011)
7. Richard Turner (Acting Chair, 2011-2012)
8. Samuel West (2012-2022)

=== Public Campaign for the Arts ===
The Public Campaign for the Arts (PCA) was launched on 18 June 2020. Its founding Director was Jack Gamble.

When the effects of the COVID-19 pandemic threatened the UK’s cultural sector, 150,000 members of the public joined the PCA to urge the Government to deliver the Culture Recovery Fund. Their role was featured in Alan Yentob’s BBC documentary, imagine…We’ll Be Back.

In March 2021, Nottingham City Council reduced budget cuts to arts organisations from 37% to 15% following a campaign which involved over 3,500 local supporters of the Public Campaign for the Arts.

In May 2021, over 160,000 people supported the PCA’s national campaign against cuts to arts and creative courses at Higher education level in England.

In February 2022, the Royal Borough of Windsor and Maidenhead abandoned a 100% cut to arts funding and approved a 17% increase, after a PCA campaign supported by former UK Prime Minister Theresa May.

== Organisation and governance ==
Campaign for the Arts is registered in England and Wales as a charity and a company limited by guarantee. It is governed by a Board of Trustees, of which the current Chair is Jack Haynes. The current Director and CEO is Jack Gamble.
