= Martin Clarke (journalist) =

British journalist (born 1964 or 1965)

- Born: 1964 or 1965 (age 60–61)
- Occupation: Journalist
- Years active: 1987–present
- Employer(s): Daily Mail; Scottish Daily Mail; The Scotsman; Daily Record; Sunday Mail; The Mail on Sunday; Ireland on Sunday
- Known for: Former editor-in-chief and chief executive of MailOnline
- Children: 3

Martin Clarke (born 1964 or 1965) is a British journalist. He was the driving force behind MailOnline, which he was responsible for building into the most popular newspaper website in the UK.

== Biography ==
Clarke was born in 1964 or 1965. After joining the Daily Mail in 1987, he launched the Scottish Daily Mail and was its editor. He then edited The Scotsman, the Daily Record, and the Record's sister title the Sunday Mail. He was executive editor of The Mail on Sunday, where he launched Live magazine. He was also launch editor of Standard Lite and London Lite; both became defunct.

Clarke rejoined the Mail group in 2001 as editor of Ireland on Sunday, which had been bought by Associated Newspapers. He took over MailOnline in 2006. In 2008, he became publisher at DMG Media and relaunched MailOnline. Clarke later said that leading MailOnline was not a job he wanted at the start. He played a part in building MailOnline into the most popular newspaper website in the UK, and second only to The New York Times worldwide.

In December 2021 he said he wanted to leave his role to "pursue new challenges", but that he would "remain available" to the company until the end of 2022 to support it in its search for a new leader. DMG Media owner Lord Rothermere said he had "reluctantly" accepted his resignation. On 24 February Rothermere announced that UK editor Danny Groom would become acting global editor of MailOnline the following week. In the role he would oversee the website's UK, US and Australian editorial operations.

In March 2023, The New European reported that Clarke was part of a consortium of investors that had unsuccessfully sought to buy MailOnline the previous year. He was said then to be planning to launch a competitor to MailOnline, with his investors.

Media offices
Preceded by	Editor-in-chief and chief executive of MailOnline; 2006–2022	Succeeded by Danny Groom as acting global editor of MailOnline
