= Carron Greig =

English business executive, landowner and courtier

Sir Henry Louis Carron Greig KCVO CBE DL (21 February 1925 – 11 July 2012), usually known simply as Carron Greig, was an English business executive, landowner and courtier.

== Early years ==
The son of Phyllis (née Scrimgeour) and Sir Louis Greig, he was born in Kingston, Surrey, and attended Sandroyd School, Eton and Sandhurst.

== World War II ==
He served in the Scots Guards from 1943 to 1947, where he was made a captain and intelligence officer. He was part of the 3rd (Tank) battalion, which worked mostly in Germany as the enemy was in retreat; his hand was crushed by a tank barrel. Other junior officers in his battalion included future Deputy Prime Minister William Whitelaw, Robert Runcie, a future Archbishop of Canterbury, and future industrialist Hector Laing (United Biscuits).

== Business career ==
Greig joined London shipbrokers Horace Clarkson & Co. Ltd in 1948, serving as Director and managing director before being named Chairman (1973–1985). He later became chairman, Horace Clarkson, PLC (1976–93). One of his colleagues at Horace Clarkson was Sir Alexander Glen.

He also served as Director of British gunmaker James Purdey & Sons (1972–2000).

== Personal life ==
In 1955, he married Monica Kathleen Stourton (1928–2019), daughter of Major Hon. John Joseph Stourton and Kathleen Alice (née Gunther), on 23 September 1955. The marriage produced three sons and one daughter (Louis, Jonathan, Geordie, and Laura).

Carron Greig was a Gentleman Usher for Queen Elizabeth II from 1961 until 1995, when he became Extra Gentleman Usher. His son Louis was Page of Honour to the Queen, and his daughter Laura was a Lady-in-Waiting to Diana, Princess of Wales.

Sir Carron Greig died on 11 July 2012, aged 87, at Fleet, Hampshire.

== Sources ==
- International Who's Who, 2012, 75th edition, p. 809. Routledge: London & New York; ISBN 978-1-85743-607-5
