= Stewart Steven =

British newspaperman and author (1935 – 2004)

- Born: Stefan Gustaf Cohen; 30 September 1935 (one source says 1937); Hamburg
- Died: 19 January 2004 (aged 68); London
- Education: Mayfield College
- Occupations: author newspaper reporter newspaper editor
- Employer(s): Central Press Features, political reporter 1961–63; Western Daily Press, political correspondent 1963–64; Daily Express political reporter 1964–65, diplomatic correspondent 1965–67, foreign editor 1967–72; Daily Mail, asst ed 1972–74, associate ed 1974–82; Mail on Sunday, editor 1982–92; Evening Standard, editor 1992–95; Mail on Sunday, columnist 1996–
- Board member of: Better English Campaign 1995–97; Thames Advisory Group 1995–97; London Film Cmmn 1996–2000; Chairman, National Campaign for the Arts c:a 1999–2004; Chairman, Advisory Council, National Campaign for the Arts c:a 1996–2004
- Spouse: m 1965, Inka Sobieniewska
- Children: adopted Inka's son (Jack)
- Parent(s): Rudolph Steven (m. 1931, d. 1943); Trude Steven (d. c:a 1952)
- Awards: Granada Television's What The Papers Say award

Stewart Gustav Steven (born Stefan Gustaf Cohen; 30 September 1935 – 19 January 2004) was a British newspaper editor and journalist who grew circulation but whose career was marked by three major errors.

== Biography ==
Born in Hamburg to Jewish parents, Steven fled to England with his parents in 1941 as a refugee. He subsequently became a journalist with the Central Press, then the Western Daily Press, and from 1963 the Daily Express. At the Express, he was a political reporter, diplomatic correspondent and finally foreign editor, before becoming an assistant editor of the Daily Mail in 1972, and associate editor in 1974.

In 1972, the Daily Express reported a "world exclusive" that Martin Bormann, Hitler's deputy, was living in South America. After six days, the story was found to be a hoax. Steven left for the Daily Mail. In 1977, he took responsibility for the publication of a false story claiming that British Leyland had a fund to pay bribes.

In 1982, he became editor of the Mail on Sunday, serving until 1992, when he became editor of the Evening Standard. In 1995, he printed a story critical of Tony Blair under the name of Bryan Gould, a former member of the Labour Party's shadow cabinet; in fact, Conservative Party Home Secretary Michael Howard's teenage son Nick had written the article. Steven retired later in the year, serving as the last chairman of Punch and on the board of the London Film Commission.

Steven continued to write a weekly column for the Mail on Sunday until the time of his death.

Steven was an early enthusiast for the London Eye. He enjoyed cricket and rugby. He supported the arts, both personally and in his newspapers.

When he married Inka Sobieniewska, a half-Russian, half-Polish pop singer in 1965, he adopted her son and raised him as his own. Inka took up painting after retiring from music. At the time of his death, he was caring for her as she suffered from multiple sclerosis.

== Books ==
- Steven, Stewart (1974). Operation Splinter Factor (1st ed.). Philadelphia: Lippincott. ISBN 0-397-00982-8. LCCN 73022353.
- Steven, Stewart (1980). The Spymasters of Israel. New York: Macmillan. ISBN 0-02-614410-7. LCCN 80021497.
- Steven, Stewart (1982). The Poles. New York City: Macmillan. ISBN 0-02-614460-3. LCCN 82009924.

Media offices
Preceded by David English	Editor of the Mail on Sunday; 1982–1992	Succeeded by Jonathan Holborow
Preceded by Paul Dacre	Editor of the Evening Standard; 1992–1995	Succeeded by Max Hastings
