= MailOnline =

Website of the Daily Mail

- Website type: Entertainment; Lifestyle; Personal finance
- Available in: English
- Owner: Daily Mail and General Trust
- Website: dailymail.co.uk
- Commercial: Yes
- Registration: Optional
- Launched: 2003
- Current status: Active

MailOnline (also known as dailymail.co.uk and dailymail.com outside the UK) is the website of the Daily Mail, a tabloid newspaper in the United Kingdom, and of its sister paper The Mail on Sunday. MailOnline is a division of dmg media, which is owned by Daily Mail and General Trust plc.

Launched in 2003 by the Associated Newspapers’ digital division led by ANM managing director Andy Hart, MailOnline was made into a separately managed site in 2006 under the editorship of Martin Clarke and general management of James Bromley. It is now the most visited English-language newspaper website in the world, with over 11.34m visitors daily in August 2014.

Previously, there was an attempt to call into question the integrity of the website's journalism after NewsGuard's feature which is designed to fight what it describes as fake news. Microsoft Edge warned users against trusting content at the site, asserting that "this website generally fails to maintain basic standards of accuracy and accountability" and "has been forced to pay damages in numerous high-profile cases". This warning has since been removed, and NewsGuard stated that the website "generally maintains basic standards of accuracy and accountability", though it "still failed to gather and present information responsibly".

== Reach ==
The website has an international readership, featuring separate home pages for the UK, US, India and Australia. While the MailOnline maintains the politically conservative editorial stance of the print edition, much of the content featured on the website is produced exclusively for the MailOnline and is not published in the Daily Mail. It is known for its "sidebar of shame", a box listing celebrity misdemeanours. The Financial Times, alluding to a quote by Samuel Johnson, has suggested that "If you are tired of MailOnline, you are tired of Kim Kardashian's life – and most readers are not."

The website reached 199.4 million unique monthly visitors in December 2014, up from 189.52 million in January 2014 and 128.59 million in May 2013, according to the Audit Bureau of Circulations.

Globally, MailOnline is the most visited English-language newspaper website; ComScore gave the site 61.6 million unique desktop computer visitors for January 2014, ahead of The New York Times' website, which received 41.97 million visitors in the same month. According to ComScore, MailOnline recorded 100.5 million visitors across desktop computers, smartphones and tablets in that month. In July 2014 it recorded 134 million users.

Almost 70% of its traffic comes from outside the UK, mostly from the United States. The Daily Mail print newspaper has no presence there, but has aggressively targeted the country with its online offering, branded as the "Daily Mail" rather than MailOnline. In January 2014 it paid over £1m to the Charleston Daily Mail for the domain name www.dailymail.com in order to increase its attractiveness to US advertisers.

In January 2014, it was ranked the eighth most-visited news website in Australia, up from tenth in December 2013. Globally the site was forecast to reach £60m in advertising sales in the year to September 2014, up 49%.

£35m has been invested in creating the site. The site has introduced sponsored articles, with a guarantee of 450,000 page views at a cost of £65,000 per article.

== Content ==
MailOnline features a broad mixture of international news, and carries mainly UK-focused coverage of sport, personal finance, travel, celebrity news, science and lifestyle editorial. As of September 2014, it employs 615 people, including 406 editorial staff. These create over 750 articles per day.

A major component of the website is its entertainment news. It is estimated that 25% of the traffic received by the website is purely to access the entertainment and gossip stories. The site publishes statistics about this activity. The house rules state that the monitors usually remove comments they do not agree with or inappropriate content in full, although they do reserve the right to edit comments. The site also does not allow comments on some articles for legal or editorial reasons.

== Sourcing ==
In 2011, the first year of the Online Media awards, MailOnline won for "Best Brand Development."

In March 2012, the Poynter Institute published an article criticising the MailOnline for failing to give proper attribution to the sources of some article content, and often reprinting paragraphs without permission or attribution. The article said that when the MailOnline is called out for stealing content, it will sometime removes the text in question without acknowledging or apologising for the problem.

Martin Clarke, editor of MailOnline, said: "We will soon be introducing features that will allow us to link easily and prominently to other sites when further recognition of source material is needed."

Daily Mail Australia has often been criticised by rival Australian news outlets, including Fairfax Media, News Corp Australia, ABC News, Nine Network, The New Zealand Herald and The Guardian Australia, for rewriting the work of their journalists despite employing 90 editorial staff as of November 2018. The Daily Mail has stated that other news outlets are threatened by their growing popularity and that they attribute their sources.

== Controversies ==
- September 2009: Geek.com reported that a story posted in MailOnline about a solar panel made from human hair was a hoax. Engineer Edward Craig Hyatt stated that it was not possible to use human hair in any configuration to generate electricity when exposed to light.
- June 2010: The Guardian reported that MailOnline had published an inaccurate story about an iPhone 4 recall, based on a Twitter message from a parody account by a Steve Jobs impersonator. MailOnline realised its error and removed the article.
- In October 2011, MailOnline and several other news sources published standby articles on Amanda Knox's trial prematurely. The articles reported an upholding of the guilty verdict before the judge had finished announcing the reversal of the guilty verdict. MailOnline stated the article was removed within 90 seconds and apologized. The article became the subject of a Press Complaints Commission complaint that noted the article's reporting of events and reactions that had not taken place and said that was "not acceptable" but commented positively on the handling of the error.
- January 2012: ABC News Radio reported the falsity of a story "repeated by numerous media outlets" concerning a supposed naming by Advertising Age of a campaign by singer Rihanna for fashion house Armani as the "sexiest ad of the year." The story, Ad Age said, "seemed to have originated with the British tabloid the Daily Mail. Huffington Post removed the story and apologized.
- January 2012: Robert Hart-Fletcher, of the charity Kids and Media, told BeefJack, a gaming magazine, that quotes attributed to him were "completely fabricated" across a range of British media, most prominently the Daily Mail and the BBC.
- April 2012: MailOnline published an article about a dentist who extracted her ex-boyfriend's teeth; the piece was later exposed as a hoax by MSNBC.com. The article appeared under the byline of reporter Simon Tomlinson, who said he did not know where the story came from.
- April 2012: The Christian Science Monitor reported that MailOnline had misused an opinion piece published in Egypt's Al-Ahram newspaper and translated into English by Al Arabiya. The original article claimed "Egypt's parliament was considering a piece of legislation sponsored by Islamists to allow men to have sex with their wives after their death." The Daily Mail, according to Monitor staff writer Dan Murphy, "distorted the original claim from a proposal to a done deal: 'Egyptian husbands will soon be legally allowed to have sex with their dead wives', the tabloid claimed, apparently having misunderstood the original Al Arabiya translation."
- October 2012: Actor Nicolas Cage received an apology and damages for a false story in MailOnline about allegations of tax evasion.
- July 2014: The MailOnline apologised after publishing an inaccurate story about the actor George Clooney and the family of his fiancée. MailOnline said: "The story was not a fabrication but supplied in good faith by a reputable and trusted freelance journalist. However, we accept Mr Clooney's assurance that the story is inaccurate." Clooney described it as "the worst kind of tabloid. One that makes up its facts to the detriment of its readers."
- April 2016: Martin Fletcher wrote in the New Statesman about travelling to Iraq and writing a piece for The Times, then seeing his piece appear on MailOnline under someone else's byline "within five hours".
- November 2016: The headline "(Almost) Straight Outta Compton" in an article about the actress Meghan Markle is subsequently seen as part of racist treatment of Markle by some parts of the British media.
- February 2017: Wikipedia bans MailOnline citations as unreliable content.
- April 2017: The Sun threatened MailOnline with legal action over copyright infringement regarding a Sun exclusive video. According to a Sun executive, MailOnline was seen as responsible for blatant "piracy".
- July 2017: The Sun and the MailOnline drew criticism over the online posting of nude photos of Jodie Whittaker, the first women to play the character of The Doctor in the British television show Doctor Who.
- November 2018: The media analysis television show Media Watch dedicated an entire program to criticising the Daily Mail.
- January 2019: as part of its feature designed to fight fake news, Microsoft Edge began to warn users against trusting MailOnline content, asserting that "this website generally fails to maintain basic standards of accuracy and accountability" and "has been forced to pay damages in numerous high-profile cases". This was overturned a week later.
- June 2019: MailOnline has been blocked in China and remains inaccessible for not demonstrating "correct thought".
- August 2023: MailOnline suspended journalist Dan Wootton as it investigated allegations of inappropriate behaviour in the workplace.

== Awards ==
In March 2014, MailOnline Sports was named Laureus Sports Website of the Year at the 2014 Sports Journalist Association awards.

In December 2013, the MailOnline Android mobile app, Daily MailOnline, was named one of "The Best Apps of 2013" in the UK by the Google Play store.

In 2013, the MailOnline was singled out for a Design Effectiveness Award by the British Design Business Association. Brand42, the British agency that designed the MailOnline, received a Gold and the Grand Prix for the 2008 revamp at the annual Design Business Association's Design Effectiveness Awards. The Grand Prix is the top prize at the awards ceremony and is given to the design project that delivers the greatest commercial benefit.

In 2012, the MailOnline received the chairman's award for Online Media.

In 2012, the Daily Mail and MailOnline won "eight awards, including newspaper of the year, campaign of the year and hat-trick for Craig Brown".

"I'd like to pay the most enormous tribute to all of the journalists on the Daily Mail and MailOnline, our new very successful, equal partner," Dacre said after accepting the newspaper of the year award.
