= Patricia Harmsworth, Viscountess Rothermere =

English socialite and actress (1929–1992)

The Right Honourable The Viscountess Rothermere
- Born: Patricia Evelyn Beverley Matthews; 5 May 1929; London
- Died: 12 August 1992 (aged 63); Nice, France
- Occupations: Actress, socialite
- Title: Viscountess Rothermere
- Spouses: Christopher John Brooks (m. 1951; div. 1957) Vere Harmsworth, 3rd Viscount Rothermere (m. 1957)
- Children: with Brooks: Sarah Brooks (b. 1956) with Harmsworth: Geraldine Harmsworth (b. 1957); Camilla Harmsworth (b. 1964); Jonathan Harmsworth, 4th Viscount Rothermere (b. 1967)
- Parent: John William Matthews

Patricia Evelyn Beverley Matthews Harmsworth, Viscountess Rothermere (5 May 1929 – 12 August 1992) was an English socialite and actress. As Beverly Brooks, she appeared in several films, such as Reach for the Sky (1956).

== Early life ==
Patricia Evelyn Beverley Matthews was born on 5 May 1929 to John William Matthews, an architect.

== Career ==
Shortly after her first marriage, and the birth of her first child, she enrolled at the Rank Charm School to become a starlet. This led to her being given a part in Reach for the Sky.

=== Filmography ===
- Simon and Laura (1955) – Mabel
- Lost (aka Tears for Simon) (1955) – Pam (telephone operator) – uncredited
- Man of the Moment (1955) – Air Hostess
- Find the Lady (1956) – June Weston
- Reach for the Sky (1956) – Sally

=== Television ===
- The Vise – "Diana" in episode "The Eighth Window" (episode No. 1.19) (4 February 1955)
- Clive James: Postcard from London, appears as herself, "Bubbles", (BBC, 1991).

== Personal life ==
When she was 22 years old, Matthews met Captain Christopher Brooks, of the Coldstream Guards, while she was attending a motor-racing event at Goodwood. They married soon after on 2 June 1951. They had one child, Sarah Jane Brooks, in 1956.

At the age of 27, while still married to Captain Brooks, she met Vere Harmsworth (later 3rd Viscount Rothermere) (1925–1998) at a party. She soon divorced Brooks and married Harmsworth on 21 March 1957. In 1957 and 1964, she gave birth to two daughters. After her father-in-law, Esmond Harmsworth, 2nd Viscount Rothermere (1898–1978), remarried and produced a son, also named Esmond, Patricia researched the methods of a Dr August Von Borosini in influencing the sex of her baby and gave birth to a son in December 1967. Their children were Geraldine Theodora Gabriel Harmsworth (born 1957), Camilla Pamela Caroline Harmsworth (born 1964) and Jonathan Harold Esmond Vere Harmsworth, 4th Viscount Rothermere (born 1967).

As Lady Rothermere, she led a colourful social life, earning her the nickname of "Bubbles" through a love of champagne. She died aged 63 from a heart attack in Nice, France, after taking an accidental overdose of sleeping pills.

=== Honours ===
In 1997, Jonathan Harmsworth set up The Patricia Rothermere Award in honour of his mother. It was a two-part award and the first part went to Judi Dench in recognition of her services to theatre. The second part was given to promising drama students of that year. In 1997, that went to Mark Rice-Oxley. The award was presented at the Evening Standard Theatre Awards show. It was later called the Lady Rothermere Drama Award.
