= Peter Wright (journalist) =

British newspaper editor (born 1953)

Peter Wright (born 13 August 1953) is a British newspaper editor.

Wright attended Clare College, Cambridge, then took a graduate trainee position with Thomson Regional Newspapers, working as a reporter on the Hemel Hempstead Evening Post-Echo. In 1979, he moved to the Daily Mail, working on various desks before becoming Femail Editor, then Features Editor and Deputy Editor.

In 1998, he became editor of the Mail on Sunday. While at the Mail on Sunday, Wright initiated the giveaway of promotional CDs and DVDs, including the global first release of Prince's Planet Earth album. He also served on the Press Complaints Commission. In March 2012, Wright moved to become Editor Emeritus for all Associated Newspapers titles. In that role he was one of the group of four newspaper industry representatives who negotiated with the Government over Cabinet Office minister Oliver Letwin's proposal for regulation of the British press to be overseen by a Royal Charter, and was the author of the industry's rival Royal Charter proposal . He became a member of the Complaints Committee of the new independent press regulator, the Independent Press Standards Organisation, when it was launched in September 2014 . He was also a member of the Committee which in 2015 reviewed the working of the Defence Advisory Notice system, under which British journalists are warned about possible defence and security issues, and recommended it be replaced with the current Defence and Security Media Advisory system . In 2017 he became a member of the nominations committee for the Thomson Reuters Founders Share Company .

== Phone Hacking ==
In August 2014, Roy Greenslade, a supporter of Hacked Off , a group which campaigns to place Britain's press under state-approved regulation, alleged in the Guardian newspaper that Wright withheld important evidence from the Press Complaints Commission when it held its 2009 inquiry into the News International phone hacking scandal. Specifically, he claimed Wright had withheld from the PCC information that The Mail on Sunday had been told by police four of their journalists had had their voicemail messages intercepted by the News of the World, and this would have provided the PCC with evidence that phone-hacking at the News of the World extended beyond 'rogue reporter' Clive Goodman.

Wright refuted this claim in a letter to the Guardian in which he said when the police contacted The Mail on Sunday, a month before Goodman and private investigator Glenn Mulcaire's 2006 trial, they gave no indication that anyone else at the News of The World was involved. He said: 'Had it occurred to me, when the PCC was discussing the fresh allegations made by the Guardian in July 2009, that the hacking of our journalists’ phones was anything other than a minor part of the series of offences for which Goodman and Mulcaire had already been convicted, I would happily have shared it with other commissioners. I have never made any secret of it, nor had any reason to – after all, our journalists were victims of these crimes just as much as anyone else.'

Media offices
Preceded by Jonathan Holborow	Editor of the Mail on Sunday; 1998-2012	Succeeded by Geordie Greig
