= Lincoln Chronicle =

Lincolnshire newspaper

The Lincoln Chronicle was a weekly newspaper which served Lincoln and parts of Lincolnshire, England in various guises between 1833 and 2007. The Chronicle had an associated website, Lincoln Today, which is now defunct.

== History ==
The paper was launched in 1833 as The Lincolnshire Chronicle and General Advertiser. During the 20th century, it was produced in a variety of localised editions. Between 1985 and 1987, as the Lincoln Chronicle, it was given away free in copies of the Lincoln Standard. It replaced the Standard when the latter closed in January 1987.

The title was one of those acquired by Johnston Press from Southnews in May 2000. Johnston decided to close the title early in 2007, apparently because it could not attract enough advertising revenue to cover costs. At the time, more than 42,000 free copies were distributed every Thursday.

== Notable members of staff ==
- Mike Maloney: Photographer who went on to work for The People. He received an honorary doctorate from the University of Lincolnshire and Humberside in 2001. Maloney was the Group Chief Photographer for Trinity Mirror when he left the staff in 2002. He was awarded the OBE for services to photo-journalism in 2005, becoming the only "Fleet Street" photo-journalist ever to receive the award.
- Frank Palmer: Began his career at the Chronicle in the 1950s before making his name at the Daily Express and the Daily Mirror. He was the first journalist to interview Sir Matt Busby after the Munich air disaster.

== See also ==
- Lincolnshire Echo
