= Marcia Pointon =

British art historian

Professor Marcia Pointon OBE
- Education: University of Manchester
- Scientific career
- Fields: History of British art; European early modern visual culture
- Workplaces: University of Sussex

Marcia Rachel Pointon OBE is a historian of British art. She trained at the University of Manchester, receiving her PhD there in 1974. From 1975, she was at the University of Sussex, becoming Professor of the History of Art in 1989. In 1992, she moved to the University of Manchester to take the Pilkington Professorship in the History of Art, a position she held until 2002. She now works as a free-lance consultant and researcher. She is also an emeritus professor at Norwich University of the Arts.

== Writing ==
Pointon is a prolific author, widely recognised as one of the leading scholars of British art. She has written over fifteen books and numerous scholarly articles and reviews. Her innovative approach to the subject emerged with her book Naked Authority: The Body in Western Painting and developed further with Hanging the Head: Portraiture and Social Formation in Eighteenth-Century England. Continuing her exploration of the semiotics of the body, Pointon published Brilliant Effects: A Cultural History of Gem Stones and Jewellery, a study of personal adornment in western culture. Brilliant Effects was awarded the Historians of British Art book prize in 2011 single author category post 1800 for books published 2010/2011. Her most recent book is Portrayal and the Search for Identity, Reaktion Books 2013, ISBN 9781780230412, reviewed in Apollo Magazine July/August 2013, p. 97' Pointon has led the field in applying theoretical discourse to the business of thinking about art, notably in the context of long eighteenth-century British culture.'

Pointon's most read work is probably History of Art: A Students' Handbook (1980) which has become an established introductory text for students beginning in art history. The book was reissued in 1986, 1993 and 1997. A fifth and substantially rewritten edition was published by Routledge in 2014.

Since 2009 Pointon has researched and published on the relationships between materials and meanings as for example in her essay Enduring Characteristics and Unstable Hues: Men in Black in French Painting in the 1860s and 1870s in Art History September 2017 and her chapter The Importance of Gems in the work of Peter Paul Rubens 1577-1640 in Ben van den Bercken and Vivian Baan, eds., Engraved Gems. From Antiquity to the Present, Leiden 2017

== Selected publications ==
- History of Art: A Students' Handbook. Allen & Unwin, 1980 5th edn.2014 .
- Naked Authority: The Body in Western Painting, Cambridge University Press 1990, out of print.
- Hanging the Head: Portraiture and Social Formation in Eighteenth-Century England, Yale University Press, 2993, out of print.
- Strategies for Showing: Women Possession, and representation in English Visual Culture 1665-1800, Oxford University Press, 1997
- Brilliant Effects: A Cultural History of Gem Stones and Jewellery, Yale University Press, 2009.
- Portrayal and the Search for Identity
- Rocks, Ice and Dirty Stones: Diamond Histories

== External sources ==
- Papers of Marcia Pointon at the John Rylands Library, Manchester
