= Maiko Jeong Shun Lee, Viscountess Rothermere =

Japanese-born Korean philanthropist (born 1949)

The Dowager Viscountess Rothermere
- Born: Jeong Shun Lee 이정선; 1949 (age 76–77)
- Occupations: Philanthropist, Patron of the arts
- Spouse(s): Vere Harmsworth, 3rd Viscount Rothermere (1993–1998)

Maiko Jeong Shun Lee, Viscountess Rothermere (born 1949) is a Japanese-born Korean philanthropist and patron of the arts active in New York City, Paris and London. She is the widow of the 3rd Viscount Rothermere, proprietor of British newspaper the Daily Mail, whom she married in 1993, having been his girlfriend for many years.

== Charity work ==
Lady Rothermere has been a patron of the Philharmonia Orchestra since 2001, is a trustee, and has also served as chairman of the endowment fund since 2005. She was a trustee of The Prince's Drawing School until 2013. She was also involved in a project commissioned by the Prince of Wales, which raised finance for a film that followed the rebuilding of the Gwanghwamun Gate at the Gyeongbokgung Palace in Seoul, South Korea. She is also trustee of the Friends of the Alola Foundation, supporting the lives of the women and children in East Timor. Lady Rothermere was a major contributor to the endowment fund for the Leslie H Blumgart chair in Surgical Oncology at the Memorial Sloan–Kettering Cancer Center. She has also set up a fund to support the education of children at Siwon House in South Korea.

In 2009 Lady Rothermere was awarded the Moran-Jang medal, one of the highest honours given to Korean civilians by the Republic of Korea. It was given to Lady Rothermere in recognition of her work in promoting Korea's image to the rest of the world, and for her outstanding charitable work.

In 2009 Lady Rothermere set up the Lady R Foundation whose stated aim is "to bring comfort and relief to the forgotten, the overlooked and the stigmatized in today’s society; to give a voice to those who have no voice, through lack of education, opportunity, illness or having been ostracized in their community". The foundation's first project in May 2010 was to take the Philharmonia Orchestra conducted by Vladimir Ashkenazy, to Sorokdo Island, a community of leprosy sufferers, off the coast of South Korea. In addition, the renowned Korean musician, songwriter and singer, Cho Yong-pil, also performed at the event.

In 2010 Lady Rothermere received the CICI Stepping Stone Bridge Award for helping Korean musicians make inroads into foreign countries and for her work with charity and volunteer programs.

In 2012 Lady Rothermere became the first patron in living memory of the charity Veterans Aid (http://veterans-aid.net), founded in 1932 as a direct response to the needs of the veterans of the First World War it continues its vital work today, looking after British and Commonwealth ex-servicemen and women in crisis.

In 2013, the Lady R Foundation secured permission for a Korean War Memorial to be built in central London and South Korea’s President Park Geun-hye was joined by the Duke of Cambridge at the ceremony to break ground for the memorial as part of her state visit. The memorial was completed and unveiled in 2014. Also in 2014, the Lady R Foundation organised a performance of Benjamin Britten’s War Requiem at the Royal Albert Hall on Remembrance Sunday to commemorate the centenary of the outbreak of the First World War. Performed by the Royal Choral Society and London Philharmonic Orchestra, the soloists included British bass-baritone Bryn Terfel.
