= Geordie Greig =

English journalist and newspaper editor (born 1960)

- Born: George Carron Greig; 16 December 1960 (age 65); Lambeth, London, England
- Education: Eton College; St Peter's College, Oxford
- Occupation: Journalist
- Title: Editor of The Independent; Former the editor of the Daily Mail and The Mail on Sunday
- Spouse: Kathryn Terry (m. 1995)
- Children: 3
- Parent(s): Sir Carron Greig; Monica Stourton

George Carron Greig (born 16 December 1960), known as Geordie Greig, is an English journalist. He has been the editor-in-chief of The Independent since January 2023, and was the editor of the Daily Mail from 2018 to 2021 and the Mail on Sunday from 2012 to 2018.

== Early life and career ==
Born 16 December 1960 in Lambeth, London, Greig is the son of Sir Carron Greig and Monica Stourton, granddaughter of the 24th Lord Mowbray, Segrave and Stourton. Members of his father's family have been royal courtiers for three generations — including his twin sister Laura, who was a lady-in-waiting to Diana, Princess of Wales. He attended Eton College before going up to St Peter's College, Oxford.

Greig began his career as a reporter for the South East London and Kentish Mercury newspaper, before joining the Daily Mail and then Sunday Today. He moved to The Sunday Times in 1987, becoming Arts correspondent in 1989 and then its American correspondent based in New York in 1991. Greig returned to London in 1995 to become The Sunday Times literary editor and was then appointed editor of Tatler magazine in 1999.

== Newspaper editor ==
Greig was appointed editor of the Evening Standard in February 2009. In 2010, Greig was appointed editorial director of The Independent, The Independent on Sunday and i (Independent Print Ltd) and the Evening Standard.

In March 2012, he became editor of The Mail on Sunday, while remaining a director of Independent Print Ltd and the Evening Standard.

He succeeded Paul Dacre as editor of the Daily Mail in September 2018. The Daily Mail's profits were reported as stable in 2019. In June 2020, The Guardian reported that the Daily Mail had surpassed The Sun as the UK's best-selling paper that May.

Greig's tenure as editor of the Daily Mail came to an end on 17 November 2021. He became consultant editor.

On 4 January 2023, The Independent announced that he was rejoining the digital news outlet as editor-in-chief.

== Other interests ==
Greig wrote the foreword for the Forward Book of Poetry (1999). His 2011 book, The Kingmaker is about his grandfather, Louis Greig, who became mentor, physician and friend to Prince Albert, the future King George VI.

Greig has also written about the life of Lucian Freud in his 2013 book published in Britain as Breakfast with Lucian: A Portrait of the Artist and in the United States as Breakfast with Lucian: The Astounding Life and Outrageous Times of Britain's Great Modern Painter. In 2023, Greig was elected FSA.

== Personal life ==
On 25 November 1995, Greig married Kathryn Terry, who is originally from Texas, United States; the couple have three children, a son and two daughters. Greig and his family live in Notting Hill, London.

== Political views ==
In 2018, Greig was described in The Guardian as "a Notting Hill Tory" with international, pro-European views like David Cameron and George Osborne.

Media offices
Preceded by Jane Procter	Editor of Tatler; 1999–2009	Succeeded by Catherine Ostler
Preceded by Veronica Wadley	Editor of the Evening Standard; 2009–2012	Succeeded by Sarah Sands
Preceded by Peter Wright	Editor of the Mail on Sunday; 2012–2018	Succeeded by Ted Verity
Preceded by Paul Dacre	Editor of the Daily Mail; 2018–2021	Succeeded by Ted Verity as editor of Mail newspapers
Preceded by Christian Broughton	Editor of The Independent; 2023–present	Incumbent
