= Lincolnshire Echo =

Weekly British regional newspaper for Lincolnshire

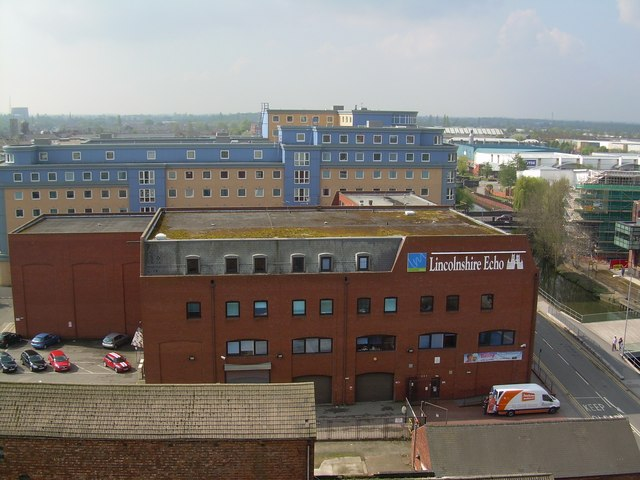
- Former offices in April 2009
- Type: Weekly newspaper
- Owner: Reach PLC
- Founded: 1893
- Circulation: 2,828 (as of 2024)
- Website: lincolnshirelive.co.uk

The Lincolnshire Echo is a weekly British regional newspaper for Lincolnshire, whose first edition was on Tuesday 31 January 1893, and is published every Thursday. It is owned by Reach PLC and it is distributed throughout the county.

The newspaper was a daily morning publication for the first 118 years of its existence until falling circulation figures prompted a switch to a weekly schedule in 2011. The final daily edition was published on 14 October with publication of the weekly edition commencing on 20 October.

The daily version of the paper was named "Regional Newspaper of the Year" by the Newspaper Society in April 2005.

The permanent closure of the printing plant in Lincoln was announced in 2006 and production was moved to Grimsby. It is now printed at one of Reach PLC's four UK printing sites.

The Lincolnshire Echo building was sold in April 2009 to the University of Lincoln and the paper moved slightly further down the same road to office space in Witham Wharf.

The paper then moved to an office on Doddington Road in 2020, before its journalists switched to remote work later that year due to the COVID-19 pandemic. The paper did not return to the Doddington Road office and in 2022, a partnership was announced whereby the Lincolnshire Echo uses office space at the University of Lincoln in return for the university's students receiving work experience and guidance from the paper. Following the closure of the vast majority of Reach PLC's offices, similar agreements were signed in Leicester and Teesside.

In 2012, Local World acquired owner Northcliffe Media from Daily Mail and General Trust. In October 2015, Local World was bought in full by its part-shareholder Trinity Mirror. Trinity Mirror was then rebranded as Reach PLC in 2018.

The paper uses its www.lincolnshirelive.co.uk website to break stories from the Echo as well as its sister weeklies, the Boston Target, the Sleaford Target, the East Coast Target and the Retford Times.

== See also ==
- Lincoln Chronicle
