= Vere Harmsworth, 3rd Viscount Rothermere =

British newspaper magnate (1925–1998)

The Right Honourable The Viscount Rothermere

Member of the House of Lords
- Lord Temporal
- In office 12 July 1978 – 1 September 1998
- Preceded by: The 2nd Viscount Rothermere
- Succeeded by: The 4th Viscount Rothermere

Personal details
- Born: Vere Harold Esmond Harmsworth; 27 April 1925
- Died: 1 September 1998 (aged 73)
- Party: Conservative (until 1997); Labour (1997–1998)
- Spouse(s): Patricia Evelyn Beverley Matthews (1957–1992); Maiko Jeong Shun Lee (1993–1998)
- Children: Geraldine Theodora Gabriel Harmsworth; Camilla Patricia Caroline Harmsworth; Jonathan Harmsworth, 4th Viscount Rothermere
- Parent(s): The 2nd Viscount Rothermere; Margaret Hunam Redhead
- Education: Eton College, Eton, Berkshire, England; Kent School, Kent, Connecticut, United States
- Occupation: Publisher

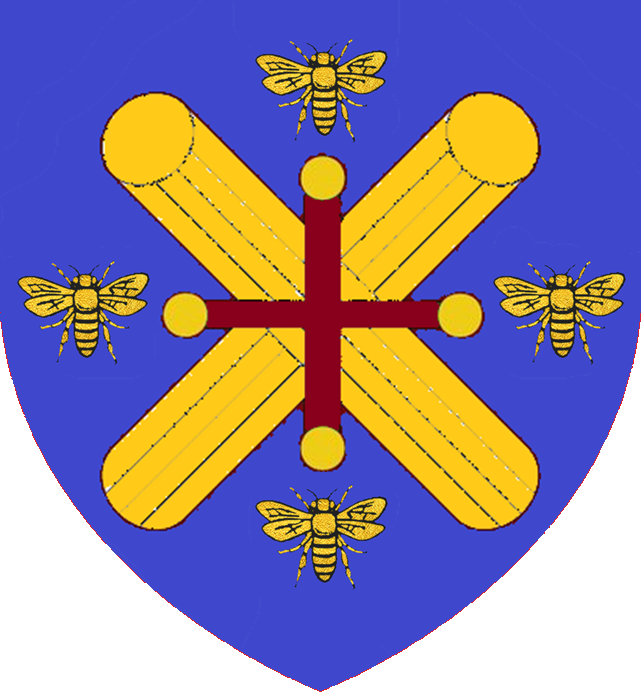
The Viscounts Rothermere shield of arms

Vere Harold Esmond Harmsworth, 3rd Viscount Rothermere (27 April 1925 – 1 September 1998), known as Vere Harmsworth until 1978, was a British newspaper magnate. He controlled large media interests in the United Kingdom and United States.

== Early life ==
Rothermere was born in 1925, third child and only son born to Esmond Harmsworth, 2nd Viscount Rothermere, in his first marriage (dissolved by divorce in 1938), to Margaret Hunnam Redhead, daughter of William Lancelot Redhead. He was educated at Eton College in England and Kent School in Connecticut, United States. At the start of the Second World War his father had him evacuated to the United States. He later returned to Britain and served during the rest of the war in the British Army, mainly in North Africa, but was never commissioned as an officer.

After his marriage he lived much of the year in France, only partly for tax reasons.

== Business life ==
Rothermere became the Chairman of Associated Newspapers in 1970, taking over from his father, who had Alzheimer's disease. He was responsible for the relaunch of the Daily Mail as a tabloid, after which its circulation increased greatly under editor Sir David English. He may also be considered the founder of The Mail on Sunday. After the death of his father in 1978, he also became chairman of parent company Daily Mail and General Trust plc (DMGT). He attempted to combine the companies in a manner calculated to avoid taxation. An artefact of this plan was the ownership of Associated Newspapers being vested in Associated Newspapers Holdings (ANH), ownership of which was split 50.2%-49.8% between DMGT and its wholly owned subsidiary Daily Mail & General Holdings (DMGH). (Since that time DMGH's name has been transferred to ANH, and the old DMGH has become Derry Street Properties)..

English succeeded him as chairman of Associated Newspapers (but not of ANH or of the parent companies) in 1992. When English died in mid-1998, Rothermere resumed the chairmanship of Associated Newspapers and replaced his protégé as president of the Commonwealth Press Union, only to die himself some months later, still chairman of DMGT, after being fatally stricken with a heart attack while dining with his son (and successor) Jonathan Harmsworth, 4th Viscount Rothermere.

Harmsworth was a member of the Founding Council of the Rothermere American Institute, which he helped establish alongside his sister Lady Cromer and Vyvyan Harmsworth.

Harmsworth's newspapers supported the Thatcher government, but following Tony Blair's landslide general election victory he defected to the Labour Party.

== Family life ==
On 21 March 1957 Rothermere married actress Patricia Brooks, subsequently known as "Bubbles" Rothermere. They had three children:

- Geraldine Theodora Gabriel Harmsworth (born 25 July 1957)
- Camilla Patricia Caroline Harmsworth (born 28 July 1964)
- Jonathan Harold Esmond Vere Harmsworth, 4th Viscount Rothermere (born 3 December 1967)

Following the death of his first wife on 12 August 1992, Rothermere married his longtime girlfriend, Maiko Jeong Shun Lee, in 1993.

Peerage of the United Kingdom
Preceded by Esmond Harmsworth	Viscount Rothermere; 1978–1998; Member of the House of Lords (1978–1998)	Succeeded by Jonathan Harmsworth
Preceded by Esmond Harmsworth	Baron Rothermere; 1978–1998	Succeeded by Jonathan Harmsworth
Baronetage of the United Kingdom
Preceded by Esmond Harmsworth	Baronet of Horsey	Succeeded by Jonathan Harmsworth
