= The Mail on Sunday =

British conservative newspaper

- Type: Weekly newspaper
- Format: Tabloid
- Owner: Daily Mail and General Trust
- Publisher: DMG Media
- Editor: David Dillon
- Founded: 2 May 1982; 44 years ago
- Political alignment: Conservative
- Language: English
- Headquarters: Northcliffe House, Kensington, London, England
- Circulation: 530,768 (as of September 2025)
- ISSN: 0263-8878
- Website: dailymail.co.uk/mailonsunday

The Mail on Sunday is a British conservative newspaper, published in a tabloid format. Founded in 1982 by Lord Rothermere, it is the biggest-selling Sunday newspaper in the UK. Its sister paper, the Daily Mail, was first published in 1896.

In July 2011, following the closure of the News of the World, The Mail on Sunday sold 2.5 million copies a week—making it Britain's biggest-selling Sunday newspaper—but by September that had fallen back to just under 2 million. Like the Daily Mail, it is owned by the Daily Mail and General Trust (DMGT), but the editorial staffs of the two papers are entirely separate. It had an average weekly circulation of 1,284,121 in December 2016; this had fallen to 673,525 by December 2022. In April 2020, the Society of Editors announced that the Mail on Sunday was the winner of the Sunday Newspaper of the Year for 2019.

== History ==
The Mail on Sunday was launched on 2 May 1982 to complement the Daily Mail, the first time Associated Newspapers had published a national Sunday title since it closed the Sunday Dispatch in 1961. The first story on the front page was the Royal Air Force's bombing of Stanley airport in the Falkland Islands. The newspaper's owner, the Daily Mail and General Trust (DMGT), initially wanted a circulation of 1.25 million. By the sixth week of its launch, sales were peaking at 700,000. Its sports coverage was seen to be among its weaknesses at the time of its launch. The Mail on Sunday's first back-page splash was a report from Lisbon on the roller hockey world championships, although this was on a match against Argentina during the Falklands War.

Lord Rothermere, then the proprietor, brought in the Daily Mail's editor David English, who, with a task force of new journalists, redesigned and re-launched The Mail on Sunday. Over three-and-a-half months English managed to halt the paper's decline, and its circulation increased to 840,000. Three new sections were introduced: a sponsored partwork, the initial one forming a cookery book; then a colour comic supplement, an innovation in the British Sunday newspaper market); and lastly, You magazine.

The newspaper's next editor was Stewart Steven. The newspaper's circulation grew from around one million to just under two million during his time. Although its sister paper the Daily Mail has invariably supported the Conservative Party, Steven backed the SDP / Liberal Alliance in the 1983 General Election. The subsequent editors were Jonathan Holborow, Peter Wright and Geordie Greig, who became editor of the Daily Mail in September 2018 and was replaced at the Sunday title by Ted Verity. In 2021, Verity left to edit the Daily Mail and was replaced by his deputy David Dillon.

In the 2016 United Kingdom European Union membership referendum, the paper, unlike its daily counterpart, came out unequivocally in favour of the Remain campaign. The Mail on Sunday has, following the change of editor from Geordie Greig to Ted Verity, shifted to a more Eurosceptic stance.

== Controversies ==
In January 2020, The Mail on Sunday was ordered to pay £180,000 in damages to a former council official in Rochdale due to a false article from May 2017. It falsely alleged that the man issued taxi licences to drivers involved in the town's child sexual abuse ring. Waj Iqbal believed that the false accusations were solely because he was of the same Pakistani background as the abusers.

In February 2021, the High Court found that The Mail on Sunday acted unlawfully when it published a letter that Meghan, Duchess of Sussex had sent to her father. The newspaper was sued for her £1.5 million legal fees, and ordered to issue a front-page apology.

=== Phone hacking ===
Under Peter Wright's editorship of the Mail on Sunday and his membership of the Press Complaints Commission (PCC), the Mail newspaper organisation withheld important evidence about phone hacking from the PCC when the latter held its inquiry into the News of the World's interception of voicemail messages. Specifically, the PCC was not informed that four Mail on Sunday journalists—investigations editor Dennis Rice, news editor Sebastian Hamilton, deputy news editor David Dillon and feature writer Laura Collins—had been told by the Metropolitan Police in 2006 that their mobile phones had been hacked even though Wright, who was editor of the Mail on Sunday, had been made aware of the hacking. The facts did not emerge until several years later, when they were revealed in evidence at the News of the World phone hacking trial.

Wright became a member of the PCC from May 2008. He took over the place previously held by the Daily Mail's editor-in-chief Paul Dacre, who had served on the body from 1999 to April 2008. The PCC issued two reports, in 2007 and 2009, which were compiled in ignorance of the significant information from the Mail group about the hacking of its journalists' phones. According to The Guardian journalist Nick Davies, whose revelations had resulted in the News of the World phone hacking trial and subsequent conviction of Andy Coulson, this reinforced News International's "rogue reporter" defence. The PCC's 2009 report, which had rejected Davies' claims of widespread hacking at the News of the World, was retracted when it became clear that they were true. Wright and Dacre both failed to mention the hacking of the four Mail on Sunday staff in the evidence they gave to the Leveson Inquiry in 2012.

=== Angela Rayner story ===
In April 2022, the Mail on Sunday published an article which alleged that unnamed Conservative Party MPs claimed that Labour's deputy leader Angela Rayner tried to distract the Prime Minister, Boris Johnson, by crossing and uncrossing her legs.

The article was widely condemned, with Johnson describing it as "sexist tripe". The Speaker of the House of Commons, Sir Lindsay Hoyle, called the story "misogynistic and offensive" and requested a meeting with the Mail on Sunday's editor, David Dillon. In response to the invitation, the Daily Mail published a front page headline which read: "No Mister Speaker: In the name of a free press, The Mail respectfully declines the Commons Speaker's summons...".

The Independent Press Standards Organisation received 5,500 complaints about the article. It reported and investigated possible breaches of clauses 1 (accuracy), 3 (harassment) and 12 (discrimination) of the Editors' Code of Practice.

== Sections ==
- You Magazine: this female magazine (featured in The Mail on Sunday) includes fashion, advice on beauty, health and relationships, food recipes and interiors pages. It has a weekly readership of 5.3 million.
- Event: this magazine includes articles on the arts, books and culture and carries reviews of media and entertainment, and interviews with sector personalities.
- Sport on Sunday: a separate 24-page section edited by Alison Kervin. It features coverage of the Premier League and Football League games on Sunday and international football games, motor racing and many other sports. Columnists include Stuart Broad and Glenn Hoddle.
- Financial Mail on Sunday: now part of the main paper, this section includes the Financial Mail Enterprise, focusing on small businesses.
- Mail on Sunday 2: This pullout includes reviews, featuring articles on the arts, books and culture and it consists of reviews of media and entertainment, and interviews with sector personalities, property, travel and health.
- Cartoons including The Gambols.

== Editors ==
1982: Bernard Shrimsley
1982: David English
1982: Stewart Steven
1992: Jonathan Holborow
1998: Peter Wright
2012: Geordie Greig
2018: Ted Verity
2021: David Dillon

== See also ==
- Irish Mail on Sunday
