= List of glamour models =

This is a list of notable glamour models.

== A ==
- Lene Alexandra
- Alessandra Ambrosio
- Pamela Anderson
- Sophie Anderton
- Sora Aoi
- Debee Ashby
- Danni Ashe
- Gianne Albertoni
- Gemma Atkinson
- Coco Austin

== B ==
- Alley Baggett
- Tanya Bardsley
- Ana Beatriz Barros
- Kelly Bell
- Monica Bellucci
- Bobbi Billard
- Kelly Brook

== C ==
- Jordan Carver
- Chyna
- Jésica Cirio
- Hannah Claydon
- Jessica-Jane Clement
- Lucy Collett
- Sam Cooke

== D ==
- Anette Dawn
- Cherry Dee
- Jakki Degg
- Amy Diamond
- Stanija Dobrojević
- Leilani Dowding
- Katie Downes

== E ==
- Carmen Electra
- Jennifer Ellison
- Maria Eriksson

== F ==
- Mónica Farro
- Isabeli Fontana
- Samantha Fox

== G ==
- Bianca Gascoigne
- Seren Gibson
- Aria Giovanni
- Louise Glover
- Lauren Goodger
- Betty Grable
- Katie Green
- Pamela Green
- Amii Grove
- Vida Guerra
- Adabel Guerrero
- Jo Guest

== H ==
- Janine Habeck
- Shelley Hack
- Chanelle Hayes
- Keeley Hazell
- Ruth Higham
- Aisleyne Horgan-Wallace
- Emily Horne
- Chantelle Houghton
- Sophie Howard
- Sofia Hellqvist

== I ==
- Chanel Iman

== K ==
- Joanna Krupa

== L ==
- Danielle Lloyd
- Rebecca Loos
- Jemma Lucy
- Linda Lusardi

== M ==
- Holly Madison
- Cindy Margolis
- Bridget Marquardt
- Jodie Marsh
- Michelle Marsh
- Melinda Messenger
- Nell McAndrew
- Karen McDougal
- Linsey Dawn McKenzie
- Nicola McLean
- Linni Meister
- Marisa Miller
- Heather Mills
- Kara Monaco
- Marilyn Monroe

== N ==
- Jessica Nigri
- Margaret Nolan

== O ==
- Maryse Mizanin

== P ==
- Alyssa Nicole Pallett
- June Palmer
- Kayleigh Pearson
- Holly Peers
- Lindsey Pelas
- Natalie Pike
- Lucy Pinder
- Lauren Pope
- Gail Porter
- Katie Price

== R ==
- Lais Ribeiro
- Tanya Robinson
- Demi Rose
- Rachel Williams

== S ==
- Georgia Salpa
- Sabrina Salerno
- Sara Sampaio
- Nikki Sanderson
- Isabel Sarli
- Danielle Sharp
- Victoria Silvstedt
- Chloe Sims
- Carol Smillie
- Anna Nicole Smith
- Frida Sofía
- Ewa Sonnet

== T ==
- Elizabeth Taylor
- Dani Thompson
- Abi Titmuss
- Peta Todd

== W ==
- Maria Whittaker
- Kendra Wilkinson
- Iga Wyrwał

== See also ==
- List of pornographic performers by decade
- List of Playboy models
