= LADbible Group =

British digital youth publisher

LADbible Group Limited
- Formerly: The Lad Bible Limited (2012–2013); The Global Social Media Group Limited (2013–2014); 65twenty Ltd (2014–2015); The LADbible Group Limited (2015–2017)
- Type: Subsidiary
- Founded: 3 April 2012; 14 years ago
- Headquarters: Manchester, England
- Key people: Alexander Solomou (co-founder and CEO); Arian Kalantari (COO)
- Owner: LBG Media plc
- Number of employees: 450 (2021)
- Website: ladbiblegroup.com

LADbible Group Limited (part of LBG Media plc) is a British digital publisher. Its headquarters is in Manchester and it has offices in London, Dublin, Sydney, Melbourne and Auckland. It was founded in 2012 by Alexander "Solly" Solomou and Arian Kalantar, with its original publication being LADbible, which started out as a Facebook page appealing to lad culture. LADbible Group produces digital content aimed at young adults, claiming to reach two-thirds of 18–34-year-olds in the UK.

In its early years, LADbible was criticised for the perceived misogynistic nature of its content, often focusing on women and sex. From the mid 2010s, it distanced itself from such content.

LADbible Group publishes original content as well as aggregating viral content from across the internet, sometimes at least historically without the consent of the original creators.

LADbible Group operates the websites LADbible, UNILAD, GAMINGbible, SPORTbible, and Tyla, among many others. They claim to generate at least 28 billion content views globally every year. It has its own in-house creative team, Joyride, set up in 2016, who work with clients to help them reach LADbible Group's younger audience of 18–34 year-olds through creative campaigns. In 2021, LADbible launched its own in-house production arm, LADstudios, which focuses on factual entertainment programming as well as documentary content.

== History ==
LADbible was originally created as a Facebook page in 2011 (or 2010) by Oxford Brookes student Alex Partridge (who later went on to found the formerly rival site UNILAD), originally as TheLadBible. Alexander "Solly" Solomou developed the idea for a social media publishing business while at the University of Leeds, where he studied business management from 2009 to 2012. Solomou originally ran the Rate Our Student Life Facebook page, which had similar content to LADbible, but did not attract comparable levels of success. Solomou purchased TheLadBible Facebook page from Partridge in early 2012, reportedly for £300. The Lad Bible Limited was founded on 3 April 2012, and developed into the LADbible project when director Arian Kalantari joined. LADbible Group's parent company was originally called The Lad Bible Limited, and changed its name to The Global Social Media Group Limited on 18 November 2013. On 19 June 2014, the parent company changed its name to 65TWENTY LTD, then to Ladbible Group Limited on 16 November 2015. Mahmud Kamani, founder of online clothes retailer Boohoo.com, was an early backer. Originally, the LADbible page exclusively featured user-generated content, only hiring journalists in 2013.

In 2014, LADbible's Facebook page had almost 2 million likes and was attracting over 5 million unique users every month. By November 2015, The LADbible page had 10.6 million followers on Facebook, with its videos viewed 800 million times per month. In that year, the company was reportedly making over £100,000 a month. LADbible has been noted for its focus on sharing aggregated viral social media content. Patrick Smith, writing in BuzzFeed News in 2015, stated that LADbible had "refined quickfire viral publishing into an art form. It spots videos before they become hits, and with lightning speed uploads them to its Facebook page. The clips are usually taken from YouTube, Twitter, Vine, Reddit, and other Facebook accounts." which as of 2015 was sometimes without attribution to the original creators. Although the company emphasises that it will pay for the external content on its pages, LADbible has been criticised for using content without the consent of the original creators. LADBible Group has threatened legal action against critics of its content.

In its early years, LADbible appealed to lad culture, targeting a similar audience to lads mags like Zoo and Nuts. During this era, LADbible (which had an 85.6% male audience as of 2014) and similar Facebook pages like UNILAD (then independent but now owned by the LADbible Group) were criticised for misogynistic content, with Laura Bates writing in The Independent in 2012 that the content of LADbible and UNILAD "encouraged sexual pursuit of unwilling women.", with LADbible featuring "Cleavage Thursday" (where women were encouraged to upload photos of their breasts) and "Bumday Monday", as well as commandments (a parody of the Ten Commandments) like "Thou shalt treat women with respect, unless their [sic] slags", "Thou shall covet thy neighbour's breasts.", "Thou shall always wear Lynx deodorant, as it is the deodorant which rakes in the pussy.", "Any female proving hard to bed shall be referred to as a Nobstacle course." and "Thou shall share hot Milf with friend if opportunity arises." LADbible later attempted from 2015 onwards to distance itself from such content, and rebrand its content both towards general entertainment (though also including some serious content), as well as campaigns towards positive social good, such as mental health awareness and campaigning against sexual harassment. In 2015, LADbible Group launched Pretty52, a sister site to LADbible designed to appeal to and written by women. Pretty52 was later rebranded to Tyla.

In 2016, LADbible Group launched "branded entertainment" agency Joyride to help with their advertising business. That year, it also began to broadcast sports matches on Facebook Live. By that year, it was "the number one most watched media property in Europe" according to Press Gazette, with 3.1 billion views across all its platforms in July 2016. Around late 2017 to mid 2018, LADbible experienced a massive drop in traffic on Facebook due to algorithm changes, from 3.2 billion views in October 2017 to 1.3 billion in June 2018. In response LADbible focused on posting content to Snapchat and Instagram. In August 2018, LADbible.com was the #1 website on Facebook, ranking ahead of mainstream news sites, with engagement on their Facebook posts also considerably higher than mainstream news sites as well as competitors like BuzzFeed (though interactions on their Facebook posts had plunged relative to the year before corresponding with the aforementioned view decline). In that year the content of LADbible was described by Will Oremus writing in Slate as having a "mix [of] celebrity gossip and feel-good stories with hastily rewritten press releases, the occasional outrage-bait, and sundry viral fluff. Also: lots and lots of dogs." with Oremus stating that the success of LADbible was down to a "concerted effort by LADbible ... to re-optimize its content for Facebook's ever-changing system.".

In October 2018, LADbible Group took over social media rival UNILAD, which LADbible Group proclaimed made them "the largest social video publisher ever". In 2019, LADbible began publishing on TikTok.

In 2019, LADbible Group launched LADbible Australia, followed by SPORTbible Australia. In the same year, they launched LADbible Ireland, claiming to reach almost half of all Irish people each month, and opened an office in Dublin to better service that audience.

By 2019 LADbible had begun to publish original videos featuring celebrities, such as Lethal Bizzle rapping with Judi Dench, and celebrities eating and reacting to snack foods.

In May 2021, LADbible Group launched LADbible New Zealand. In December 2021 the company completed a £360m float on the London Stock Exchange's AIM which raised £30m for the group and £81.1m for selling shareholders with the move, by which time it was getting 28 billion views for its content every year. In March 2023, LADbible Group completed the acquisition of the social media pages of Lessons Learned in Life (LLIL). In November 2023, LADbible Group announced the launch of their sixth website, UNILAD Tech. By 2023, LADbible Group had become the largest news publisher on TikTok, though Facebook remained LADbible Group's primary largest platform by viewership.

In 2026, the stock price of LADbible Group declined, plunging approximately 40% in a single day, due to profit warnings as a result of a decline in views caused by algorithm changes by Meta Platforms (the owner of Facebook and Instagram) to promote original content creators, resulting in the company making a number of layoffs.

== Awards ==
In November 2015, LADbible featured in the Manchester Evening News for winning two awards at the Digital Entrepreneur Awards ceremony. LADbible won the Social Media Campaign of the Year (medium/large) and founder, Solomou, won the Young Digital Entrepreneur of The Year award. In June 2018, LADbible's 'Trash Isles' campaign won eight Cannes Lions Awards at the Cannes Lions International Festival of Creativity. The campaign won two Grand Prix awards as well as a further two Gold, one Silver and three Bronze.

== See also ==
- SPORTbible
- UNILAD
