= Sam Cooke (model) =

British model (born 1985)

- Born: 19 November 1985 (age 40); Manchester, England
- Occupation: Glamour model
- Spouse: Chris Smalling (m. 2017)
- Children: 1
- Modeling information
- Height: 5 ft 7 in (1.70 m)
- Hair color: Blonde
- Eye color: Blue
- Agency: Girl Management

Sam Cooke (born 19 November 1985) is an English glamour model and Page 3 girl from Manchester. Cooke has appeared in numerous British "lads' mags", including FHM, Front, Maxim, Loaded, Zoo and Nuts in the UK, as well as on several covers around the world.

She is most famous for being a Page 3 girl in The Sun, and was the winner of the newspaper's annual Page 3 Idol competition in 2006. Cooke has also appeared in the Hot Shots Calendar.

She is married to English footballer Chris Smalling; the couple have a son, Leo, born in May 2019. Both Cooke and Smalling are vegan.

== See also ==
- Lad culture
