= Amii Grove =

British model

- Born: Amii Anne J. Grove; 5 September 1985 (age 41); Solihull, West Midlands, England
- Occupation: Glamour model
- Modeling information
- Height: 5 ft 7 in (1.70 m)
- Hair color: Blonde
- Eye color: Blue

Amii Anne J. Grove (born 5 September 1985) is an English former glamour model and Page 3 girl. She has appeared in publications such as The Sun, Nuts, Zoo Weekly, FHM and the Hot Shots Calendar.

== Life and career ==
Grove was born on 5 September 1985 in Solihull. In 2004, she competed for the title of Miss Bikini World but failed to place, she also competed in Miss England later that year, but again failed to win the title. In 2007, she was listed at position 66 in FHM's 100 Sexiest Women in the World.

=== TV appearances ===
In 2007, Grove appeared on BBC Two game show The Weakest Link. In 2009, she was interviewed during a topless shoot by Kirsten O'Brien for a documentary entitled Kirsten O'Brien's Topless Ambition. In 2010, she appeared on UK morning show Breakfast.

=== Acting career ===
In 2010, Grove appeared as "Amii" in the Steven Lawson horror film Dead Cert, and as "Jenny" in the Steven Lawson comedy film Just for the Record. In 2011, she was cast as a "Forest Woman" in the James Franco fantasy film Your Highness.

=== Personal life ===
Grove was previously engaged to footballer Jermaine Pennant. In 2007 Pennant was issued with a Fixed Penalty Notice following a row with Grove at the couple's home in Hale Village.

== See also ==
- Lad culture
- Lad mags
