= Lad lit =

Genre fiction literature for young men

Lad lit was a term used principally from the 1990s to the early 2010s to describe male-authored popular novels about young men and their emotional and personal lives.

Emerging as part of Britain's 1990s media-driven lad subculture, the term lad lit preceded chick lit. Books categorised as lad lit from UK authors Nick Hornby and Tony Parsons enjoyed both critical and commercial success. Later, in the 2000s, the term lad lit was subsumed, on both sides of the Atlantic, as a male-oriented sub-category of the then massively popular chick lit genre. Though there was heavy investment by some publishers in the sub-category, this later iteration of lad lit had much more limited success among writers, critics and readers.

The term combines the word "lad," which refers to a boy or young man and "lit," which is short for "literature." Books described as lad lit are usually characterized by a confessional and humorous writing style.

== Description ==
Lad lit typically concerns itself with the trials and tribulations of white, heterosexual, urban twenty and thirty something men, faced with changing romantic mores and the pursuit of a desired lifestyle. The stories revolve around issues like male identity crisis and masculine insecurity in relationships as a result of the social pressures and the expectations of how they should behave in work, love and life, men’s fear and finality of marriage, maturation into manhood.

The first lad lit books ostensibly sought to redefine masculinity. The archetypal protagonist of these books is the young man on the make, mindlessly pursuing alcohol, women and football. His ineptitude, drunkenness and compulsive materialism were part of his charm. The figure was created in contrast with the then current stereotype of the pro-feminist, well-groomed new man and, beneath the crass surface, the lads are attractive, funny, bright, observant, inventive, charming and excruciatingly honest. They are characters who seem to deserve more from life and romance than they are getting.

== History ==
"Lad lit" is a term of the 1990s that was originated in Britain. Several publishers, encouraged by the increasing sales of glossy magazines (Maxim, Esquire, GQ, FHM - the so-called "lad mags", from which the term "lad lit" may have evolved) believed that such fiction would open up a new readership. Thus, lad lit is not its own phenomenon; rather, it is part of a larger cultural and socioeconomic movement.

Slightly later, with the explosive rise of chick lit as a publishing category targeting young women in the late 1990s and early 2000s, publishers on both sides of the Atlantic hoped that lad lit could be a parallel category selling to young men. But lad lit never really took off: promoting novels as part of a subculture that celebrated boorish behaviour and to a demographic (young men) that rarely bought books was, arguably, an idea doomed to failure.

=== As a critical term ===
In 2002, the critic Elaine Showalter enthusiastically embraced the concept of lad lit, proposing extending the term to cover earlier fictions stretching from the works of Kingsley Amis in the 1950s and 1960s to Martin Amis (The Rachel Papers, 1973) and Bret Easton Ellis (Less than Zero, 1985 and The Rules of Attraction, 1987). Showalter excitedly explained:

Stretching from Kingsley to Martin Amis, Ladlit was comic in the traditional sense that it had a happy ending. It was romantic in the modern sense that it confronted men’s fear and final embrace of marriage and adult responsibilities. It was confessional in the postmodern sense that the male protagonists and unreliable first-person narrators betrayed beneath their bravado the story of their insecurities, panic, cold sweats, performance anxieties and phobias. At the low end of the market, Ladlit was the masculine equivalent of the Bridget Jones Phenomenon; at the high end of the high street, it was a masterly examination of male identity in contemporary Britain".

However, lad lit has not enjoyed further development as a critical term and the fourth edition of the Oxford Dictionary of Literary Terms describes it as "1990s marketing term".

== Authors ==
Nick Hornby is considered to be the originator of the genre. His early novels, Fever Pitch (1992), High Fidelity (1995) and About a Boy (1997), each have a protagonist dominated by a typically masculine obsession (football, pop music, gadgetry) that reflects his inability to communicate with women.

Other authors associated with this new wave of fiction include: John O'Farrell, Things Can Only Get Better (1998); Tony Parsons, Man and Boy (1999); Tim Lott, White City Blue (1999); Mike Gayle, My Legendary Girlfriend (1999); Mark Barrowcliffe, Girlfriend 44 (2000); Matt Dunn, The Ex-Boyfriend’s Handbook (2006); Danny Wallace, Yes Man (2008); Kyle Smith, Love Monkey (2009); Zack Love, Sex in the Title (2013).

== See also ==
- Fratire
