= Belinda Jones =

Belinda Jones may refer to:

- Belinda Jones (writer) (born 1967), British writer
- Belinda Jones (pianist), British pianist
