= Emily Carmichael =

Emily Carmichael may refer to:

- Emily Carmichael (novelist), American novelist
- Emily Carmichael (filmmaker), American filmmaker
- Pseudonym of Emily Horne (born 1978)
