= Lucy Pinder =

British actress and model (born 1983)

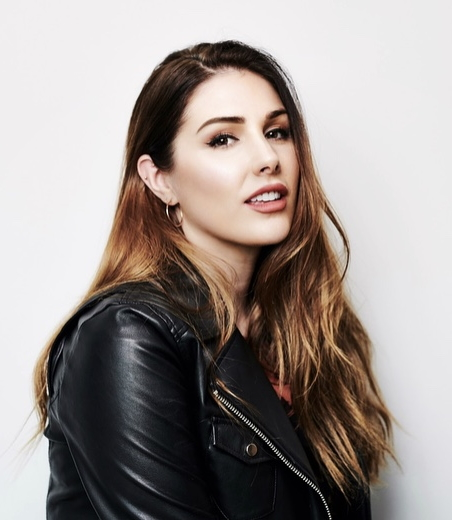
- Pinder in 2018
- Born: Lucy Katherine Pinder; 20 December 1983 (age 42); Winchester, Hampshire, England
- Occupations: Model; television personality; actress
- Years active: 2003–present
- Spouse: Russell Martin (m. 2026)
- Modeling information
- Height: 165 cm (5 ft 5 in)
- Hair color: Brown
- Eye color: Brown
- Agency: McLean-Williams Limited

Lucy Katherine Pinder (born 20 December 1983) is a British former model, television personality, and actress. Pinder rose to prominence for her work as a glamour model in men's magazines such as Nuts and Zoo Weekly, which landed her appearances on I'm Famous and Frightened!, The Weakest Link, and Celebrity Big Brother.

She made her film debut in the comedy horror Strippers vs Werewolves in 2012, which was followed by supporting roles in several films.

== Career ==
=== 2003–2010: Modeling and television appearances ===
Pinder began her career in 2003 after being discovered by a freelance photographer on Bournemouth beach, and has appeared in such publications as the Daily Star tabloid newspaper and magazines FHM, Loaded and Nuts.

Pinder first appeared topless in Nuts in 2007, and was responsible for a weekly advice column in Nuts, entitled "The Truth About Women". With vital statistics of 32F-26-34, the Australian magazine Ralph declared that she had the "Best Breasts in the World" in 2007. Pinder has appeared on FHM's list of the "100 Sexiest Women in the World" 2007 (No. 92), 2006 (No. 35), and 2005 (No. 16), and, in 2010, she was head of the Bennetts Babe Squad. In addition, Pinder has appeared on the cover of several DVDs and in photo shoots for magazines, such as Loaded and Maxim.

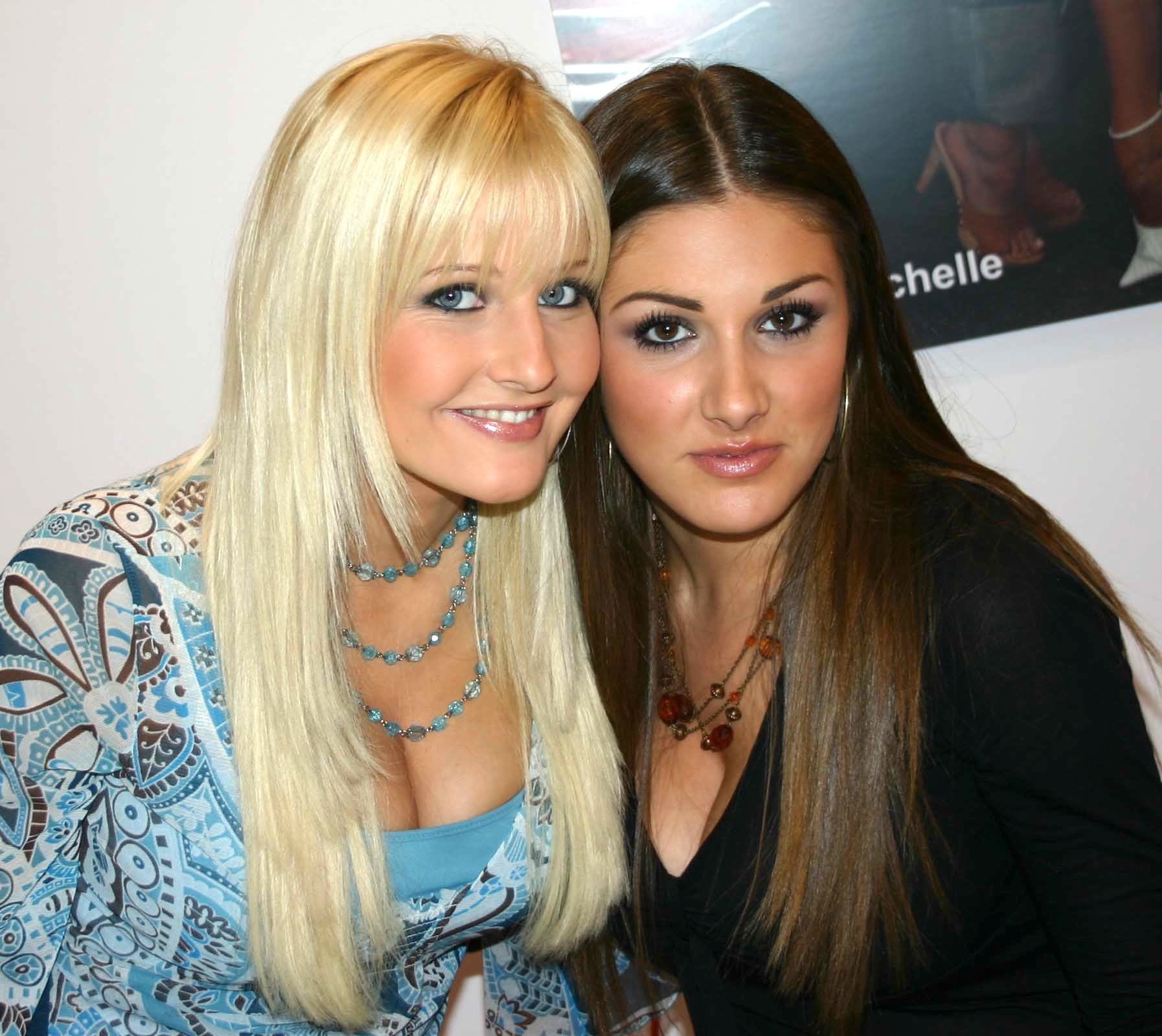
Pinder (right) and Michelle Marsh at Autosport International in Birmingham, 2004

In 2004, Pinder appeared on Living TV's series I'm Famous and Frightened!, spending the weekend at Bolsover Castle in Derbyshire investigating ghosts and spirits. Pinder appeared in the music video for the 4-4-2 song "Come On England" along with Michelle Marsh.

On 31 December 2005, Pinder appeared on Sky Sports as a celebrity soccerette on Soccer AM, during which she wore a Southampton jersey. She also sat on the sofa answering questions on topics such as modelling and football.

In September 2007, Pinder appeared as a contestant on a special edition of The Weakest Link, entitled "Wags and Glamour Girls".

On 15 January 2008, Pinder made her presenter debut for Nuts TV. She presented the Nuts TV live show on six further occasions in February and March 2008 and also presented Overexposed, which was a series on Nuts TV giving hints and tips to the aspiring amateur glamour photographer. Subsequently, she has appeared on the MTV channel's TMF, presenting, in conjunction with fellow model Kayleigh Pearson, Pinder and Pearson's Late-Night Love-in – a "countdown of saucy music videos." In February 2008, Pinder made a cameo appearance, along with Michelle Marsh, in Hotel Babylon on BBC One.

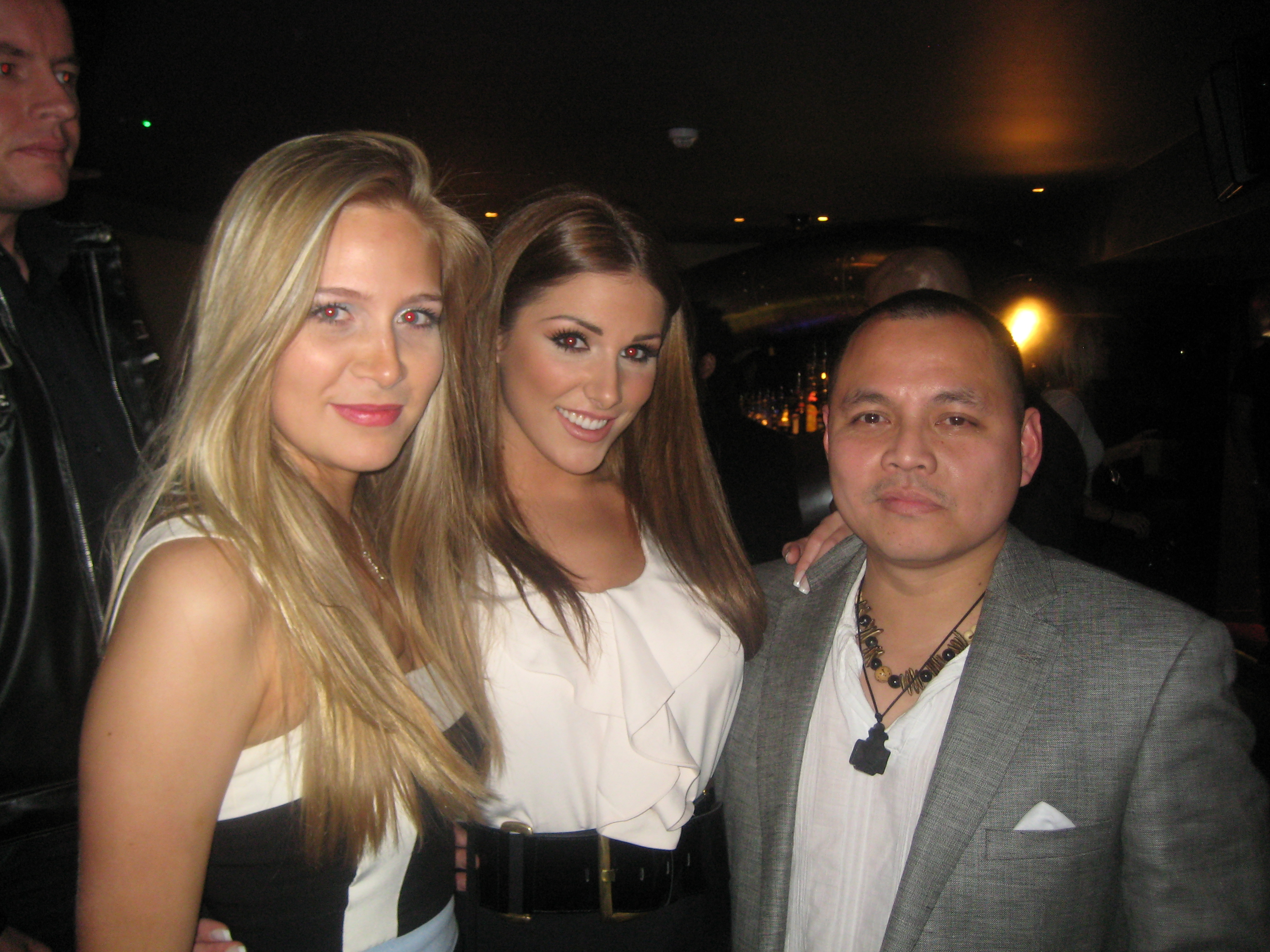
Pinder (middle) and friends at Nuts Party in 2009

From 2 January 2009, Pinder appeared in the sixth series of Celebrity Big Brother. She revealed that "thick" people irritate her. She was the first housemate to be voted out, on 9 January (Day 8) with 57% of the public vote. Pinder declared her wish to leave the Big Brother house after being driven to distraction by the constant rapping of housemate Coolio.

In February 2010, Pinder appeared on BBC Three's The Real Hustle Undercover, in which she pulled a switch on an unsuspecting punter.

=== 2012–present: Transition to acting ===
Pinder began her professional film career in 2012, when she played her first supporting role in the comedy horror Strippers vs Werewolves. In 2016, Pinder made her Bollywood debut with the action drama film Waarrior Savitri where she portrayed the role of Candy. In 2017, she starred in the American made-for-television science fiction comedy disaster film Sharknado 5: Global Swarming as the Swedish Ambassador, and the British action film Dangerous Game as Nicola alongside Calum Best and Darren Day; it received negative reviews and was described as "the worst football movie ever made." In 2021, she acted in the British romantic comedy, Me, Myself and Di, capturing the role of Diana Vickers. The following year, she starred in the sci-fi comedy The Bystanders as Julia.

== Personal life ==
Pinder has been in a relationship with football manager Russell Martin since August 2024. In February 2026, it was announced that they had got married. She is a fan of Southampton, the team Martin was managing at the time when they met.

== Charity work ==
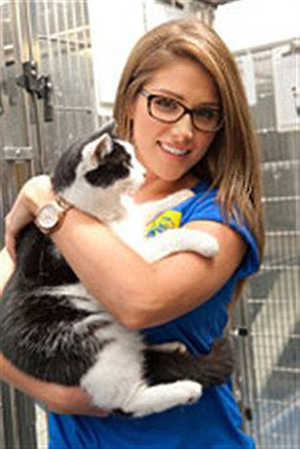
Pinder volunteering at Cats Protection in 2012

Pinder has worked closely with a number of wildlife charities, getting involved in fundraising for TigerTime, the David Shepherd Wildlife Foundation, and International Animal Rescue. She was also an ambassador for Kick 4 Life, a charity that uses football to fight poverty and disease in developing countries. She has also produced original works of art for sale in charity auctions for Keech Hospice Care and the Sports for All campaign.

Pinder has also volunteered her time at Cats Protection as part of the charity's campaign "I'm a Celebrity... Let Me Volunteer!", and she was a judge for National Cat Awards in the "Hero Cat" category in 2012.

Pinder has worked with Help for Heroes, a British charity launched in 2007 which supports members of the British Armed Forces community with their physical and mental health, as well as their financial, social and welfare needs. She also appeared in the 2011 and 2014 Hot Shots Calendar, who give fifty-percent of the money made from sales of the calendar and associated products to various UK and US military charities including the Special Operations Warrior Foundation and the aforementioned Help for Heroes.

Pinder and Rhian Sugden continue to support the Male Cancer Awareness Campaign, and they took part in the five-mile "London Strut" awareness initiative in December 2013.

Pinder supported the "Stars & Stripes 2014 Celebrity Auction" by donating an original drawing of hers that was auctioned off, with the proceeds going to TigerTime.

== Filmography ==
Film roles
Year	Title	Role	Notes
2012	Strippers vs Werewolves	Carmilla	
2014	The Seventeenth Kind	Melissa	Short film
2015	Age of Kill	Jenna	
2015	LiveJustine	Justine Cyfiawnder	
2016	Waarrior Savitri	Candy	Bollywood debut
2017	Dangerous Game	Nicola	
2017	Fanged Up	Kathyn	
2017	Sharknado 5: Global Swarming	Swedish Ambassador	Television film
2021	A Suburban Fairytale	Dawn	
2021	Me, Myself and Di	Diana Vickers	
2022	The Bystanders	Julia	
2023	Nightmare on 34th Street	Louise	

Television roles
Year	Title	Role	Notes
2004	Dream Team	Herself	
2005	I'm Famous and Frightened!	Herself	Season 4, episode 1
2005	Soccer AM	Herself	1 episode (31 December 2005)
2006	Bo! in the USA	Herself	Series 5, episode 3
2007	Book at Bedtime with Lucy Pinder	Herself	Approx. 30 episodes
2007	The Weakest Link	Herself	1 episode (8 September 2007)
2008	Hotel Babylon	Herself	Season 3, episode 1
2009	Celebrity Big Brother	Herself	Season 6, episodes 1–11, 27, 28
2009	Hell's Kitchen	Herself	Season 4, episode 9
2010	Big Brother's Little Brother	Herself	1 episode (13 January 2010)
2010	The Real Hustle	Nicole	Season 8, episode 7
2018	The Royals	Bridget	Season 4, episode 2: "Confess Yourself to Heaven"

Theatre
Year	Title	Role	Venue
2018	Worth a Flutter	Paige/Emily	Hope Theatre

Music videos
Year	Title	Artist	Album
2004	"Come On England"	4-4-2	Non-album single
