= Zip (magazine) =

British men's magazine

Zip Magazine
- Editor: Chris Andrews
- Categories: Men's magazines
- Frequency: Weekly
- Circulation: 10,000 (approx)
- Publisher: OohYeah Publishing
- First issue: 2013
- Final issue: 2015
- Country: United Kingdom
- Language: English
- Website: www.zipmagazine.co.uk

Zip was a British men's magazine published weekly by Blue Publishing for nine issues before being sold to OohYeah Publishing. It was launched on 1 March 2013 as a sister title to Loaded. It relaunched in September 2013. The original owners of Zip launched the title to take on rival titles Zoo and Nuts which were aimed at the same demographic, and had similar content.

== Loaded ==
Loaded launched its weekly sister title, Zip, after failed bids to acquire rival titles Nuts and Zoo.

== Closure ==
The website for Zip changed to zip-mag.com temporarily and then became zip.am The domain zip.am ceased to be used by the magazine some time in 2015, the Facebook account no longer exists, and the Twitter account is no longer updated.

== See also ==
- Lad culture
