= Stories We Could Tell (disambiguation) =

Stories We Could Tell is a 1972 studio album by The Everly Brothers.

Stories We Could Tell may also refer to:

- Stories We Could Tell (novel), a 2005 novel by Tony Parsons
- ...The Stories We Could Tell, a 2014 album by Mr. Big
- Stories We Could Tell: The RCA Years, a 2003 compilation album by The Everly Brothers
- "Stories We Could Tell", a song by John Sebastian, covered by The Everly Brothers and others

== See also ==
- Stories We Tell, a 2012 Canadian documentary film by Sarah Polley
