= Turning Thirty =

- Author: Mike Gayle
- Language: English
- Genre: Comedy, lad lit
- Publisher: Flame
- Publication date: 2000
- Publication place: United Kingdom
- Pages: 368
- ISBN: 0-340-76794-4
- Preceded by: Mr. Commitment
- Followed by: Dinner for Two

Turning Thirty (2000) is the third novel from Birmingham born lad lit writer Mike Gayle. It follows the story of Matt Beckford who is on the cusp of his life-changing thirtieth birthday.

== Plot ==
Unlike most people Matt Beckford is actually looking forward to turning thirty. After struggling through most of his twenties he thinks his career, finances and love life are finally sorted. But when he splits up with his girlfriend, he realises that life has different plans for him. Unable to cope with his future falling apart Matt temporarily moves back to his parents. During his enforced exodus only his old school mates can keep him sane. Friends he hasn't seen since he was nineteen. Back together after a decade apart. But things will never be the same for any of them because when you're turning thirty nothing's as simple as it used to be.
