= Espensen =

Espensen is a surname. Notable people with this surname include:

- Tiffany Espensen (born 1999), American actress
- Malene Espensen (born 1981), Danish glamour model

== See also ==
- Jane Espenson, American television writer and producer
