= Sophie Howard =

Sophie Howard may refer to:

- Sophie Howard (footballer) (born 1993), Scottish footballer
- Sophie Howard (model) (born 1983), English glamour model
