= Brooke Evers =

Australian television personality

- Born: Brooke Shay Evers; Adelaide, South Australia
- Other name: Bevers
- Occupations: Television host; model; actress; producer; DJ
- Years active: 1991–present
- Modeling information
- Height: 5’8”
- Hair color: Blond
- Eye color: Hazel
- Website: www.djbrookeevers.com

Brooke Evers is an Australian television personality, model, actress, dancer, producer and DJ. Her first break was as Zoo Weekly's "2008 Beach Babe of the Year," which secured her first national magazine cover. As an international model, Brooke has worked with major brands such as Billabong Australia, Mrs Palmers Surf and Quiksilver Worldwide.

In 2010, Evers was the presenter of The Rip Curl Pro at Bells Beach and went on to host the Australian Sexpo Tour with Australia comedian Russell Gilbert for 2011. In previous years, she frequently hosted and presented for Sydney-based company Unseen TV, covering events such as the Gold Coast 600, State of Origin, Sexpo and a number of fashion festivals. She was a full-time co-host on 90.9 Sea FM's The Drive Show from 3-7pm with radio presenter Craig 'Lowie' Lowe.

She was a featured character on the reality TV show The Stafford Brothers with her friend DJ Matt Stafford of the Stafford Brothers. Season 2 premiered on FOX8 on 27 January 2012.

In 2011, Evers accepted a position with ACP Magazines. As of 2012, she is an editorial assistant/journalist for Zoo Weekly.

== Career ==
In 2008, Evers qualified for university entry and was accepted into Griffith University on the Gold Coast. In 2010, she graduated with a Bachelor of Journalism majoring in Public Relations and digital media.

Evers is a full-time cover model, editorial assistant and journalist working for men's magazine Zoo Weekly; based in Sydney. She has been working with the magazine since 2008, and moved into an editorial role in July 2011. Zoo Weekly is published by ACP Magazines.

=== Modelling ===
Evers won a number of Australian contests and pageants. By age 16 she had established modelling contracts with major surf brands including Billabong, KULU, 2 Chillies, Mrs Palmers and Quiksilver Worldwide.

In 2003, Evers was a Miss Indy Finalist, and went on to secure shoots in FHM and Ralph Magazine. She has been featured in a number of fashion, health, sport and lifestyle magazines throughout her modelling career. As of 2012, she has over 20 magazine covers (15 national, four international) including the Netherlands, Thailand, Sweden and the UK.

In 2010, Evers featured on her first album cover for the Ministry of Sound Maximum Bass CD mixed by DJ Tom Piper.

=== Dancing ===
In 2004, she was signed by Flirtmodels Australia; performing in nightclubs, festivals and promotional gigs such as the Gold Coast 600 and network TV show Blokesworld. Over the next two years the commercial dance troupe toured extensively throughout Australia and Asia working with the likes of Bob Sinclar and Boy George.

In 2005, Evers was selected as a Crusty Demons dancer and performed at live shows throughout Australia. The Crusty Demons are a group of daredevil freestyle motorcyclists from the United States, Australia, New Zealand and Europe. In 2010, she toured for three months in Macau, China; where she performed in a convention at the Venetian Hotel and Resort.

=== TV appearances ===
During university, Evers gained multiple television hosting and presenting roles for Sydney-based company Unseen TV. She covered major events including the Gold Coast 600 (formerly known as Indy), State of Origin, and numerous fashion festivals. She was presenter and host of The Rip Curl Pro 2010 at Bells Beach and co-hosted the Australian Sexpo Tour with Australian comedian Russell Gilbert for 2011.

In 2010, she starred on the UK reality TV show I'm a Celebrity...Get Me Out of Here! which was filmed in the Gold Coast Hinterland. According to an interview, Brooke has said the show was "the most insane job" she has ever done. "I had to jump out of a helicopter, slept with rats, ate nothing but beans and white rice for four days, was covered in cockroaches, worms and spiders to win food…loved the experience but hated the tasks!"

Evers made three guest appearances on the FOX8 TV series Football Superstar in 2010.

On 21 January 2011 FOX8 premiered The Stafford Brothers; a reality TV series following the lives of Matt and Chris Stafford on tour across Europe, produced by TV host Wesley Dening. Evers is a leading characters alongside her long-term DJ partner Matt Stafford. An episode featuring her in a photo shoot produced the show's highest ratings for the season.

In 2011, Evers starred on Channel Nine's series the Celebrity Apprentice and was cast as the Surfers Paradise host on Fuel TV. In her latest TV presenting role, she is the Australian correspondent on the US television show Attack of the Show! The show is a live, prime-time review of the latest viral videos, gadgets, comics and movies.

=== Radio hosting ===
In 2010, Evers co-hosted 90.9 Sea FM's Drive Show from 3-7pm with Gold Coast radio presenter Craig 'Lowie' Lowe. She featured on the program for 6 weeks full-time over Christmas. Brooke has also made numerous appearances on Brisbane radio station Nova 106.9. She also co-hosts Australia's Party People on Fridays with Matty Acton.

=== Music ===
In 2010, Evers started to learn how to DJ while working in the club scene, practising in clubs during the day and collecting music over time. As a professional dancer she has worked alongside artists like Bob Sinclar and Boy George, and has stated she developed an understanding of popular music and reading the crowd.

She had cited artists such as the Stafford Brothers, Timmy Trumpet, DJ Tom Piper as influences, and has developed a style of commercial pop and RnB with electro house. DJ Brooke Evers was officially sponsored by Audio Technica Australia. S.K.A.M. Artist DJ Brooke Evers was the featured guest at M Nightclub on Saturday 22 August 2015.

== Sponsorships ==
In 2006, she started working with a health and sport supplement company, Australian Sports Nutrition, who she has publicly credited for her physical shape. She is sponsored by national and international organisations such as Fitness First, Envisage Clinic, Network Surf and Quiksilver Women.
