= Louise Glover =

English model (born 1983)

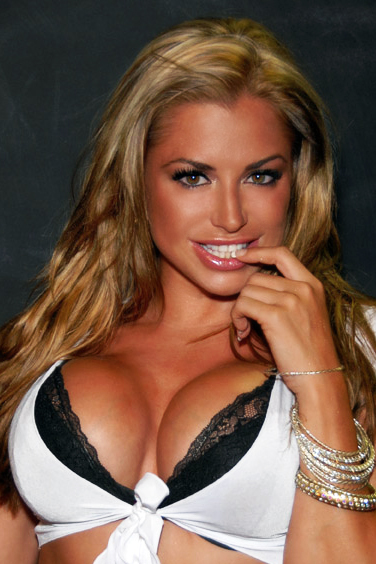
- Glover in 2009
- Born: Louise Helena Glover; 8 February 1983 (age 43); St Helens, England
- Occupation: Glamour model
- Modeling information
- Height: 5 ft 4 in (1.63 m)
- Hair color: Brown
- Eye color: Hazel
- Website: louiseglover.com

Louise Helena Glover (born 8 February 1983) is an English glamour model and beauty pageant titleholder, known for her appearances in British lad mags, including FHM, Bizarre, Maxim, Loaded, and tabloids such as the News of the World, The Sun, and Daily Star. She is the first British model to be named "Model of the Year" in Playboy Special Editions.

== Early life ==
Glover had a troubled childhood. She grew up partly in St Helens, Merseyside with her father's family, partly in Great Yarmouth with her mother's, and partly in foster care, which, she says, led to her being bullied and made her a very shy and quiet child. She changed homes and schools many times. At age 15, she was released from foster care and got her own apartment.

Glover had started her modelling career early, when at the age of nine a photographer noticed her on a shopping trip with her mother, and compared her to a young version of Lorraine Chase from the British TV show Emmerdale. Glover found she enjoyed being photographed, and planned to become a professional model from the age of 12. She began entering modelling contests at the age of 14, and beauty pageants, to get noticed as a model. She was a regional finalist for the beauty title Miss Great Britain at the age of 17, and traveled to London to be a national finalist at the age of 18, while studying holistic therapy at St Helens College.

At age 17, in 2000, Glover travelled to Belize with a Raleigh International project where she helped build a school and teach English to the local schoolchildren. At age 19, she represented Great Britain in the Miss Earth 2002 in Pasay, Philippines. Soon after, her modelling offers increased tenfold.

== Career ==
=== 2002–2005: modelling work for British newspapers and magazines ===
Glover began getting paid modelling work in 2002. She became known as a glamour model, appearing topless in British lad mags, including FHM, Bizarre, Maxim, Loaded, and tabloids News Of The World, The Sun, and Daily Star. She was featured in TV shows and documentaries including Dream Team, National IQ Test, and Blaggers. She has also appeared as a clothing model, for Ed Hardy clothing, Sex Symbol denim wear, Austin Reed ladies wear, and on front covers, photo shoots, and interviews for magazines in South America, USA, Canada, Spain, Sweden, Germany, Russia, South Africa, and Australia.

Glover continued to support Raleigh International after her modelling success, raising funds for the group, and traveling to Malaysia in 2004 to help build another school and teach English to residents of a remote village. She climbed Mount Kinabalu, the highest mountain in Malaysia, to help Raleigh International raise funds.

=== 2005–2012: Playboy, Penthouse, photography, and career diversification ===
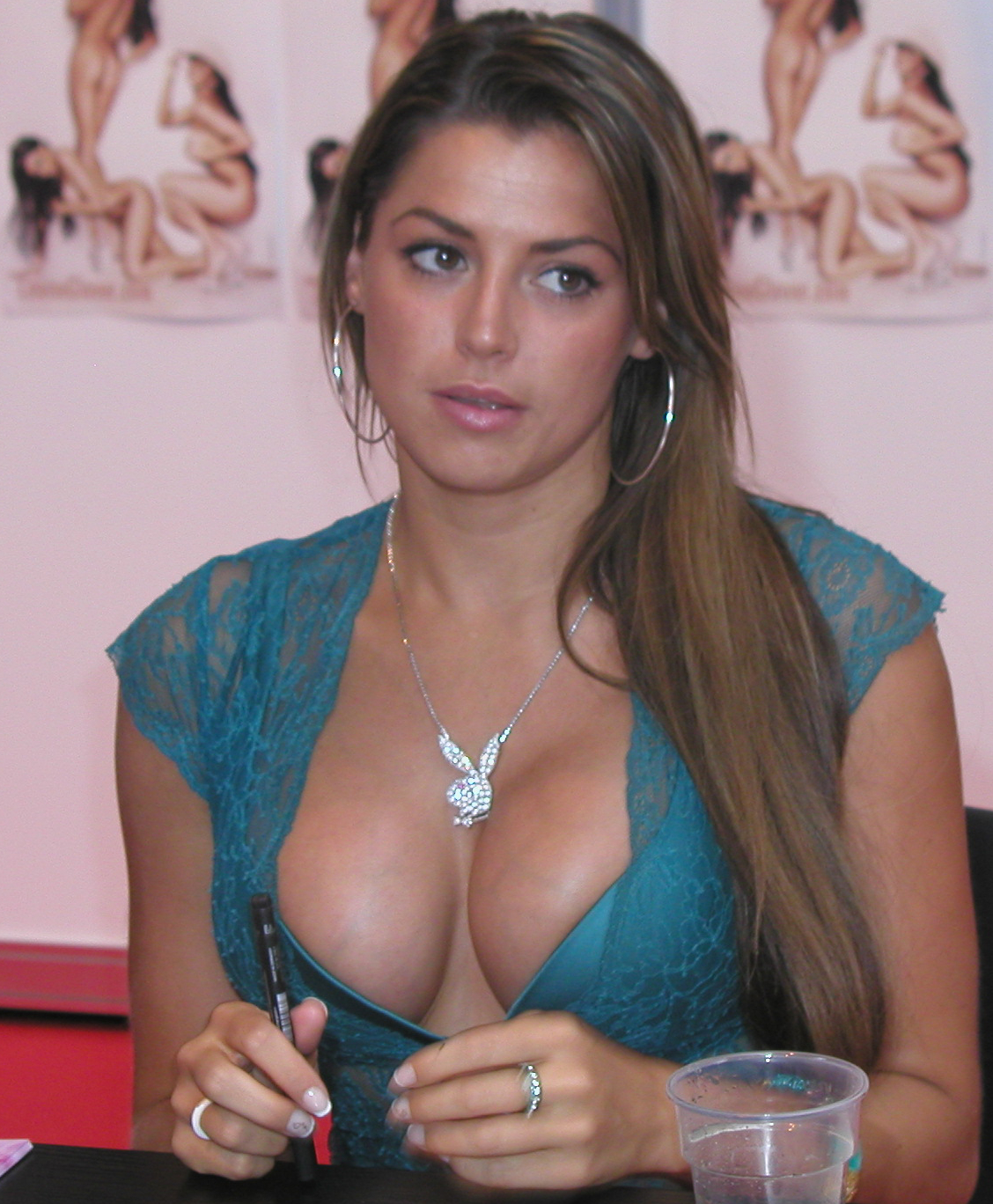
Glover at Max Power Live auto show, July 2006

Glover met Playboy publisher Hugh Hefner during a photo shoot in Los Angeles, when she was 21. Glover appeared on the cover of Playboy Vixens magazine in January 2006, in the "Top 100 Sexiest Playboy Models" 2006 pictorial special edition, and won Playboy Special Editions Model of the Year 2006; she was the first British winner. Glover became the UK's Penthouse "Pet of the Month" for March 2007 after posing for a celebrity cover and 10 page feature. She has appeared in the American edition of Playboy magazine for September 2007, and on the cover of Playboy France.

In 2006 Glover co-launched an adult lingerie online store called Female Bliss, and signed a contract with a Swedish record label as an aspiring singer. In 2007, she appeared in her first music video acting role, for Scouting for Girls' single "She's So Lovely".

=== 2012–present: health and fitness, further humanitarian work, and animal welfare activism ===
After falling seriously ill from sepsis in 2012, Glover began to study health and nutrition. She launched a healthy cookbook range and became a personal trainer, setting up her own business 'BodyByLouise'. At the same time, Glover also competed in multiple fitness modelling competitions. Her best results came in 2015, where she was crowned 1st place as both the London UK BFF fitness and bikini model.

After her parents died within a few months of each other, Glover raised funds for British Heart Foundation and British Lung Foundation in their memory by trekking to Everest Base Camp to scatter their ashes.

In 2017, Glover volunteered in Peru with the charity All Hands and Hearts, helping rebuild a school destroyed in the 2016–17 South American floods. In 2021, Glover set up a marine conservation project in the Maldives. Through the project, she helped restore damaged coral reefs in the region. She also helped educate people about the importance of preserving them for the future. She has also been involved in animal welfare activism. She volunteered with rescue dogs while backpacking in Mexico. In 2022, she set up her own dog walking business.

== Personal life ==
By 2007, Glover lived in London. She was convicted of assault in 2001 and 2009, but served no jail time. In August 2005, Glover was ordered to perform 240 hours of community service after claiming welfare benefits while being paid for posing for newspapers and magazines.

== See also ==
- List of glamour models
