= Christ the King Catholic High School, Southport =

School in North-West England

Christ The King Roman Catholic High School
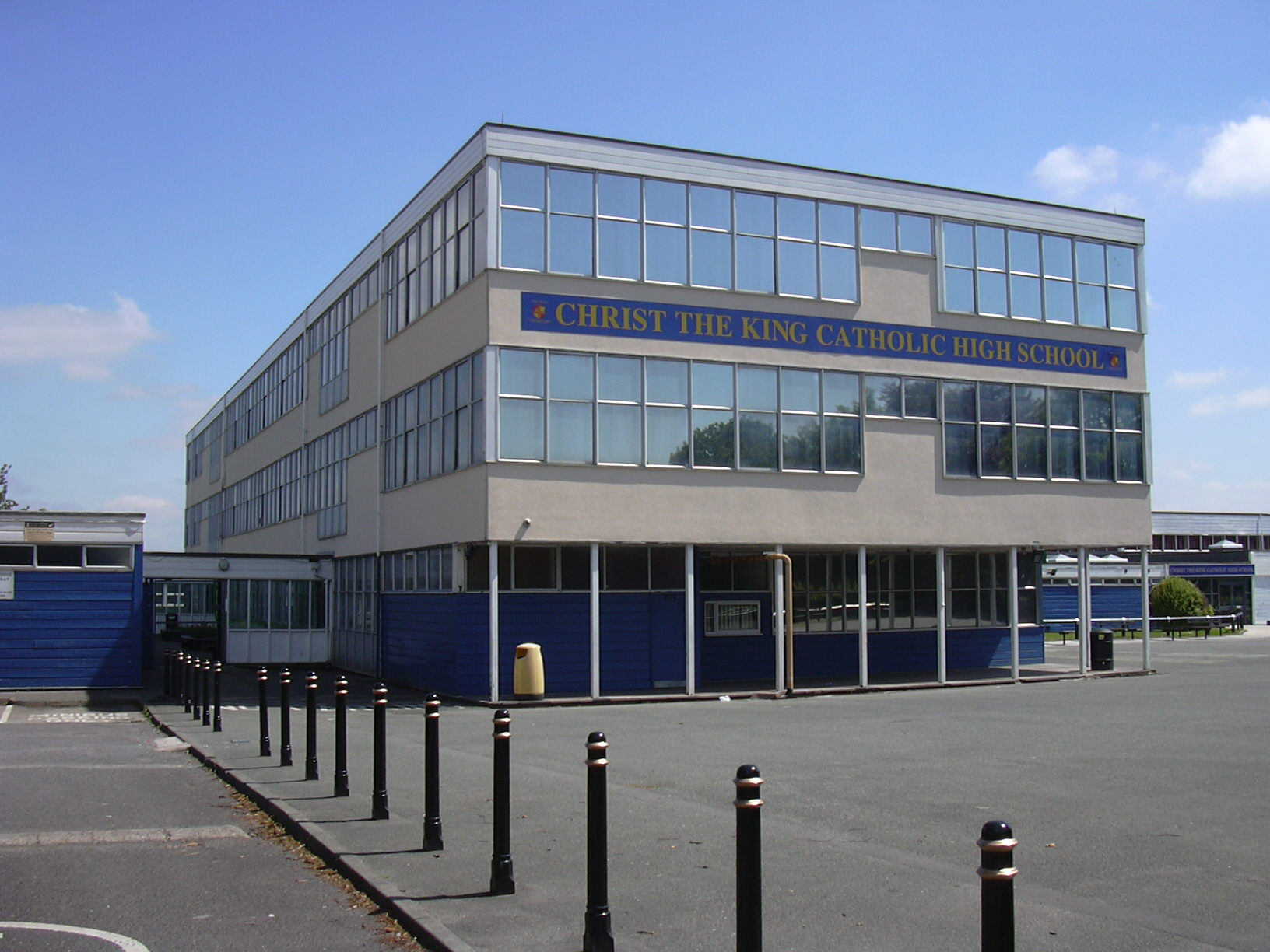

Location
- Southport, Merseyside; England; 53°37′32″N 3°00′08″W

Information
- Type: Voluntary aided school
- Motto: Christus Rex Cum Virtute Agere
- Local authority: Sefton
- Department for Education URN: 104964 Tables
- Ofsted: Reports
- Headteacher: Erin Wheeler
- Age: 11 to 18
- Enrolment: ~1200
- Website: http://www.christtheking-school.com/

Christ the King Catholic High School and 6th Form College, is a large Roman Catholic secondary school located in Birkdale, Southport. The school was originally built to be temporary, however it is still standing after over fifty years and has approximately 830 pupils ranging from 11 to 18 years old.

CTK is larger than the average secondary school. The proportion of students known to be eligible for free school meals is below the national average and the number of students from minority ethnic groups is higher than the average highschool in the United Kingdom but few students speak English as an additional language.

== Awards ==
The school has achieved a number of awards including the NAACE Information and Communication Technology (ICT) Mark, the Artsmark, Healthy School status, specialist technology status and Leadership Partnership school.

== Alumni ==
- Ian Dunbavin (b. 1980) - professional footballer, Accrington Stanley F.C.
- Sophie Howard (b. 1983) - glamour model
