= PinupFiles =

Adult website

- Website type: Internet pornography
- Available in: 4 languages
- List of languages English, Spanish, French, German
- Area served: Worldwide
- Website: pinupfiles.com
- Commercial: Yes
- Registration: Required
- Users: 56,000+ subscribers
- Launched: 1998; 28 years ago
- Current status: Active

PinupFiles is a paid subscription Internet pornography website featuring mainly large breasted women. The companies slogan is "Classically inspired busty pinup girls."

It is available in four languages.

== History ==
Pinup Files was launched in 1998 as an image database for pin-up models. In the beginning they uploaded images of well known models from the 1950s, 60s and 70s. In 2003 the website switched focus to large breast models as they continued to feature pin-up models from the 1990s. Beginning in 2005 the website began publishing their own new content. By late 2005 the website's popularity skyrocketed because of the hundreds of hours of top-less videos of well known models including a handful of notable Playboy Playmates.

The website's notability continued to grow in the 2010s as the age of internet pornography surged. From 2010 until 2015 users jumped by 75% and total page views by 150%. This growth can be contributed to the site's intensive upgrades during this time. Developers made the site easier to navigate and fixed bugs including a crashing bug that plagued the site due to its exponential growth.

== Additional ventures ==
=== Pinup Dollars ===
Pinup Dollars was founded by Pinup Files in 2009 and is an affiliate program of websites. It offers two services Revenue sharing and web referral. They also offer full website building and maintenance for clients as of March 2020 five pinup girls have Pinup Dollar websites. The websites include, full page or half page ads, banners, picture galleries, video galleries, downloadable images as well as hosting/cam show opportunities. Pinup and the model spilt profits 50/50 and ad revenue 45/55, with 55% going to model.

=== Pinup Foto ===
Pinup also runs a submit a model website called PinupFoto a small branch of Pinup Files. It was launched in 2001 and in 2015 it saw its largest referral year ever seeing over 17,000 model submissions. Pinup Foto also offers services in media creation, digital marking, promotions and modeling management.

== Pinup Model of the month ==
PinupFiles' Pinup Model of the month award winners
Month	Model	Wins	Month	Model	Wins	Month	Model	Wins	Month	Model	Win(s)
2017			2018			2019			2020		
January	_{not awarded}	—	January	Alice Goodwin	1st	January	Bianca Beauchamp	2nd	January	Tessa Fowler	5th
February	_{not awarded}	—	February	Sammy Brady	2nd	February	Tessa Fowler	2nd	February	Cara Rose	3rd
March	Bella Brewer	1st	March	Leanne Crow	1st	March	Jelena Jensen	1st	March	Luna Amor	1st
April	Barbara Moore	1st	April	Cara Rose	1st	April	Maserati	1st	April	Anna Sivona	1st
May	Brooke Brit	1st	May	Melissa Debling	1st	May	Beth Lily	2nd	May		
June	Linsey Dawn McKenzie	1st	June	Tessa Fowler	1st	June	Cara Rose	2nd	June		
July	Malene Espensen	1st	July	Bianca Beauchamp	1st	July	Jenna Valentine	1st	July		
August	Dolly Fox	1st	August	Beth Lily	1st	August	Tessa Fowler	3rd	August		
September	Jordan Carver	1st	September	Sammy Brady	3rd	September	Jana Defi	2nd	September		
October	Sammy Brady	1st	October	Taylor Stevens	1st	October	Bianca Beauchamp	3rd	October		
November	Marie-Claude Bourbonnais	1st	November	Alice Goodwin	2nd	November	Tessa Fowler	4th	November		
December	Wendy Fior	1st	December	Jana Defi	1st	December	Maserati	2nd	December		

== Models ==
The following is a list of notable models featured on pinupfiles.com:

- Bianca Beauchamp
- Amber Campisi
- Malene Espensen
- Tessa Fowler
- Barbara Moore

== See also ==
- List of pornography companies
- List of glamour models
