= Mike Gayle =

English journalist and novelist

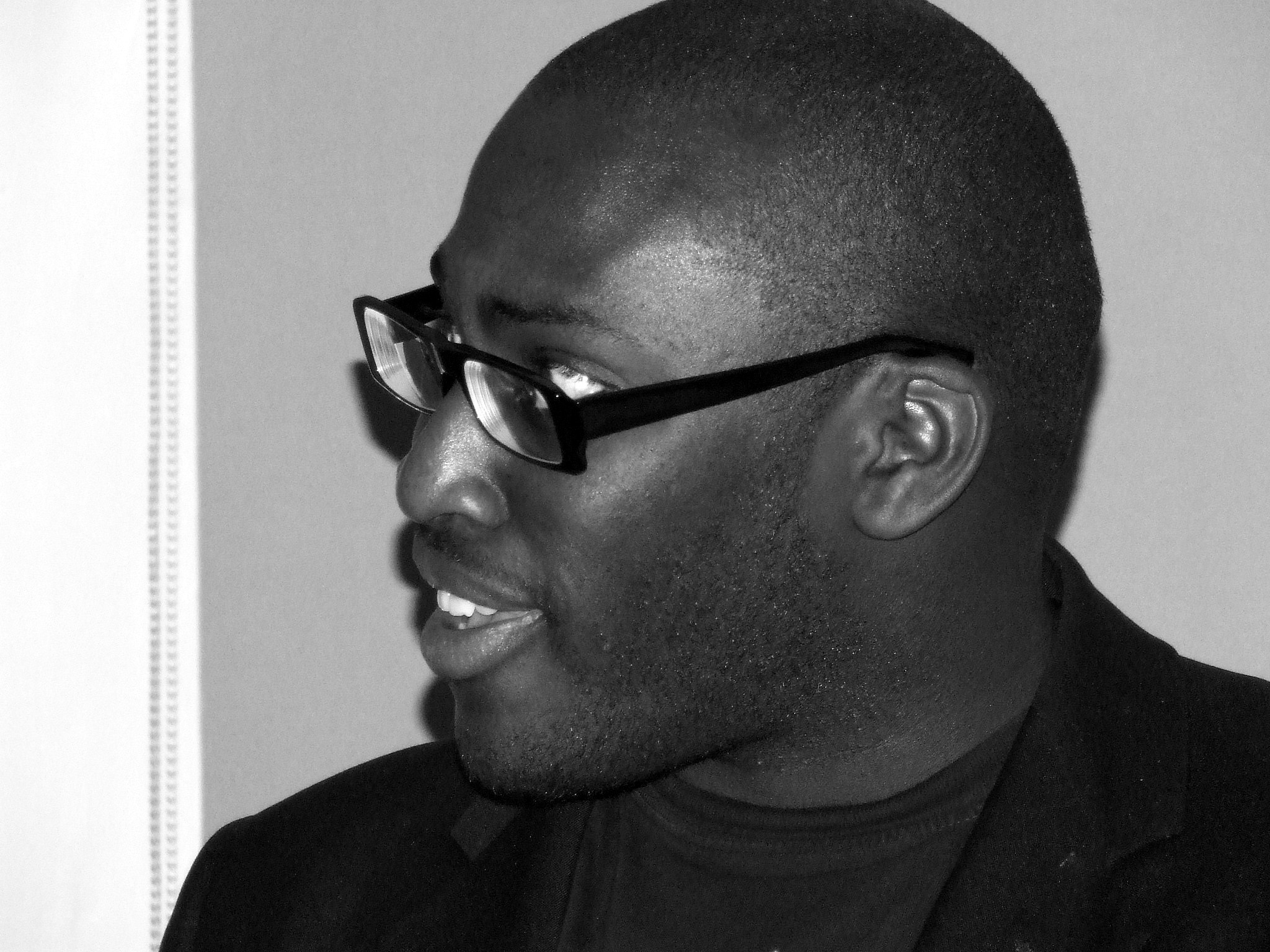
- Mike Gayle
- Born: October 1970 (age 55); Quinton, Birmingham, England
- Occupation: Author
- Writing career
- Genres: Lad lit, popular fiction
- Website: mikegayle.co.uk

Mike Gayle (born October 1970) is an English journalist and novelist.

== Biography ==
Gayle was born in Quinton, Birmingham, to parents from Jamaica, and is the younger brother of broadcaster Phil Gayle. He attended Lordswood Boys' School where he was Head Boy. He studied Sociology and Journalism at university.

Gayle edited a music fanzine and joined a Birmingham listings magazine before moving to London and beginning a postgraduate diploma in journalism. Before having his first novel published, he was a features editor and later an agony aunt for Just Seventeen and Bliss. As a freelance journalist he has written for the Sunday Times, The Guardian, The Times, the Daily Express, FHM, More!, The Scotsman and Top of the Pops.

Gayle is a chick-lit author, although he has expressed a dislike for the term. Alongside Tony Parsons and Tim Lott, he has also been associated with a "new wave of fictions about inadequate young British masculinities".

Gayle is friends with Danny Wallace, who has dubbed Mike his Minister of Home Affairs in the Kingdom of Lovely. He lives in Harborne with his daughters and his wife Claire.

== Novels ==
- My Legendary Girlfriend. London: Flame, 1998. ISBN 0-340-71816-1
- Mr. Commitment. London: Flame, 1999. ISBN 0-340-71825-0
- Turning Thirty. London: Flame, 2000. ISBN 0-340-76794-4
- Dinner for Two. London: Flame, 2002. ISBN 0-340-82342-9
- His 'n' Hers, 2004. ISBN 0-340-82537-5
- Brand New Friend, 2005. ISBN 0-340-82539-1
- Wish You Were Here, 2007. ISBN 0-340-82542-1
- The Life & Soul of the Party, 2008. ISBN 0-340-82544-8
- The To Do List, 2009. ISBN 0-340-93675-4
- The Importance of Being a Bachelor, 2010. ISBN 0-340-91851-9
- The Stag and Hen Weekend, 2012. ISBN 1444742825
- Turning Forty, 2013. ISBN 978-0-340-91853-1
- Seeing Other People, 2014. ISBN 978-1-4447-0863-9
- The Hope Family Calendar, 2016. ISBN 978-1-4736-0895-5
- The Man I Think I Know, 2018. ISBN 978-1-473-60899-3
- Half a world away, 2019. ISBN 978-1-473-68733-2
- All The Lonely People, 2020.
- Hope Street, 2025
- On We Go, 2026
