= Dangerous Game (2017 film) =

2017 British film

Dangerous Game is a 2017 British action film. It has been described as possibly “the worst football movie ever made”.

== Plot ==
A footballer is forced into a life of crime in order to help clear his best friend from a gambling debt owed to gangsters.

== Cast ==
- Calum Best as Chris Rose
- Amar Adatia as Adam Chopra
- Darren Day as Demetri
- Lucy Pinder as Nicola
- Malia Arkian as Dawn
- Lee Stafford as Viktor
- Martin Tyler as commentator
- Chris Kamara as pundit
- Jess Impiazzi as Ashley Queen
- Gary Webster as Detective Crawford
- Jessica-Jane Stafford as Karina

== Release ==
Dangerous Game was out on 16 June 2017. There was a premiere in Leicester Square. Calum Best missed the start of the premiere despite being the main star as he missed his flight from Mykonos where he had been on holiday and had to charter an emergency helicopter.

== Reception ==
Little White Lies (magazine) described it as “ridiculously silly” but “somewhere within its bewildering make-up is a meta work which applies dream logic to a rejected plot from Footballers’ Wives, while starring contestants from Celebrity Big Brother. It is both terrible and utterly fascinating.” The Independent declared “As a directorial debut, Richard Colton really has served up a turkey”. The Guardian argued the film might not actually exist but rather had been “precision engineered specifically to send me – and me alone – to the point of gibbering meltdown. I mean, it can’t be real. It just can’t.” As the chosen film on the 4th film club episode from Quickly Kevin, Will He Score? host Josh Widdicombe described it as “the worst acted 90 minutes I have seen of anything, and I include school nativities in that”.
