= Nick Spalding =

British comedy novelist (born 1974)

- Born: 1974 (age 51–52); United Kingdom
- Occupation: Author
- Writing career
- Language: English
- Genres: Fiction, comedy
- Notable works: Love From Both Sides (2013); Fat Chance (2014); Checking Out (2018)

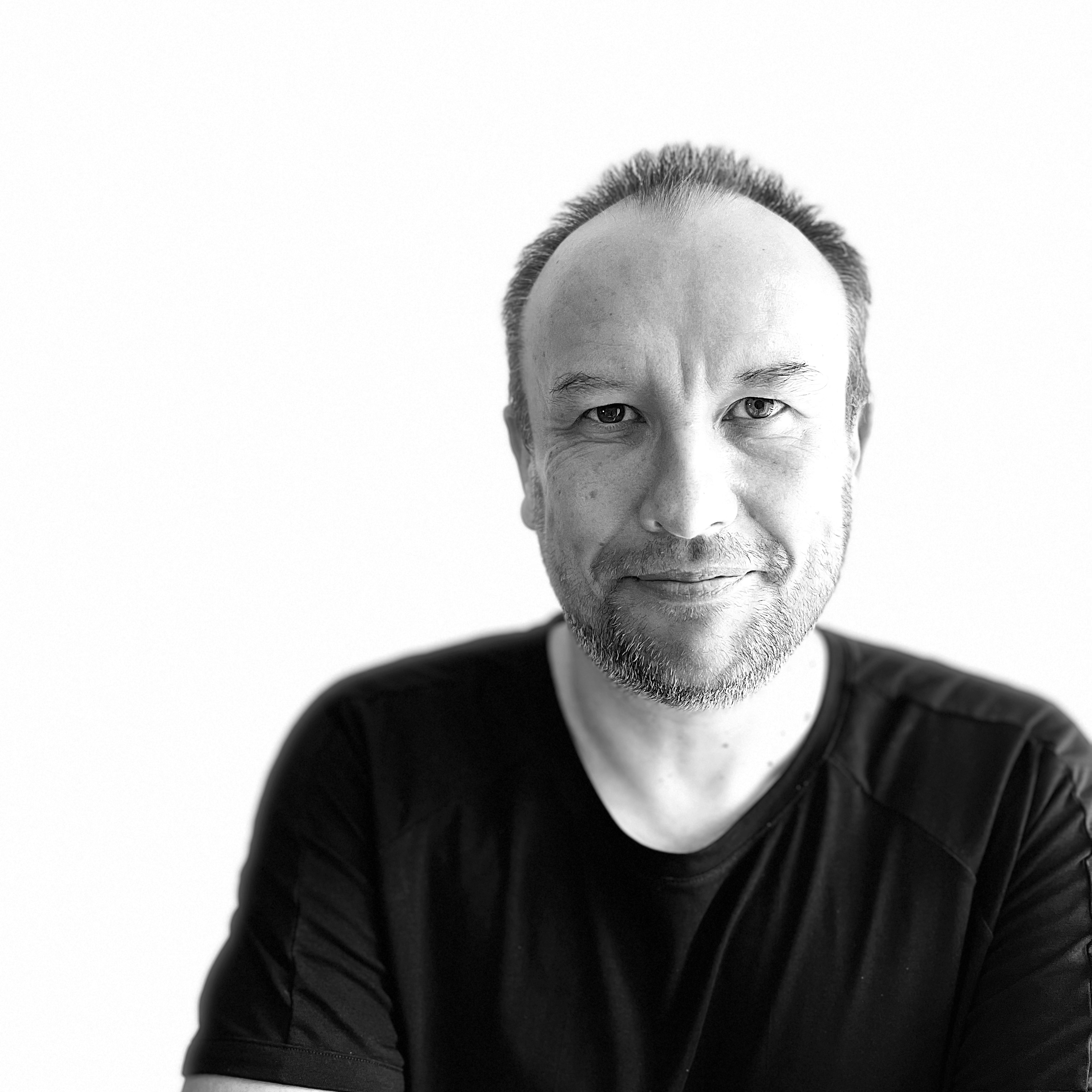
Nick Spalding

Nick Spalding (born Isle of Wight, England, in 1974) is a British comedy novelist.

== Writings ==
His self-published 2012 e-books Love From Both Sides and Love And Sleepless Nights were both best-sellers. Love From Both Sides, sold a quarter of a million copies in 2012.

Based on that book's success he signed up with Hodder and Stoughton. His books are currently published by Amazon Publishing's Lake Union imprint. He has some self-published books still published by Notting Hill Press

Spalding has written articles for the Writers' & Artists' Yearbook and has held a writing masterclass for The Guardian.

== Books ==
- (2013). Love Under Different Skies. Hodder & Stoughton. ISBN 9781444767070
- (2013). Love And Sleepless Nights. Hodder & Stoughton. ISBN 9781444768190
- (2013). Love From Both Sides. Hodder & Stoughton. ISBN 9781444768176
- (2014). Fat Chance. Amazon Publishing. ISBN 9781477824566
- (2015). Bricking It. Amazon Publishing. ISBN 9781503948426
- (2016). Mad Love. Amazon Publishing. ISBN 9781503941113
- (2018). Checking Out. Amazon Publishing. ISBN 9781612185941
- (2019). Dry Hard. Amazon Publishing. ISBN 9781542041652
- (2019). Dumped Actually. Amazon Publishing. ISBN 9781542041324
- (2020). Logging Off. Amazon Publishing. ISBN 9781542017480
- (2020). Going Green. Amazon Publishing. ISBN 9781542017503
- (2021). You Again?. Amazon Publishing. ISBN 9781542032087
- (2022). Third Wheel. Amazon Publishing. ISBN 9781542030267
- (2023). Old Boys. Amazon Publishing. ISBN 9781662507281
- (2024). Grave Talk. Amazon Publishing. ISBN 978-1662519987
