= SPORTbible =

Sports news publisher

- Company type: Private company
- Website type: Sports news publisher
- Available in: English
- Founded: 3 October 2013; 12 years ago
- Owner: LADbible Group Ltd
- Founder: Alexander Solomou
- Website: sportbible.com
- Advertising: Native
- Registration: No
- Current status: Online

SPORTbible is a sports-focused social media publisher. Their headquarters are based on Dale Street in Manchester's Northern Quarter, United Kingdom. SPORTbible is part of LADbible Group and describes itself as "one of the largest communities for sports fans across the world".

SPORTbible Limited was incorporated by co-founders Alexander "Solly" Solomou and Arian Kalantari on 3 October 2013, In 2015, SPORTbible was part of 65twenty group which was one of the fastest-growing social media publishers in the UK.

== History ==
Solomou developed the idea for a digital media business while studying at Leeds University between 2009 and 2013. On 3 April 2012, Solomou founded SPORTbible's parent company The Lad Bible Limited and subsequently launched a sport focused social publishing brand, SPORTbible in October 2013. The SPORTbible Facebook page now has in excess of 11 million followers, making them one of the largest sports communities on Facebook. The parent company of SPORTbible has changed its name several times over the years. On 18 November 2013, it changed from The Lad Bible Limited to The Global Social Media Group Limited. The name changed again on 19 June 2014 to 65TWENTY LTD and then on 16 November 2015 to The LADbible Group Limited.

== Sponsorship deals and partnerships ==
In May 2017, SPORTbible announced an exclusive media partnership with Formula One team Sahara Force India. The partnership lasted one year, during which the SPORTbible logo featured on the nose of the Formula One car. In November 2018, SPORTbible joined up with Ultimate Boxxer to stream the boxing tournament live to millions of fans on Facebook. This partnership provided a "transformed boxing experience for the next generation of boxing fans".

== See also ==
- LADbible Group
