= Hot Shots Calendar =

Promotional calendar

Hot Shots Calendar was a promotional calendar featuring glamour models for the UK based arms firm Edgar Brothers. The calendar was published from 2009 to 2020.

Fifty-percent of the money made from sales of the calendar and associated products went to various UK and US military charities including the Special Operations Warrior Foundation and Help for Heroes.

The calendars were made in association with several other sponsors including: SureFire, Crye Precision, Soldier Systems and SmithOptics. The exclusive media partner for the calendar is Soldier Systems.

== Themes ==
The theme for the 2013 calendar was 1950s pin-up girls. It was launched at the Imperial War Museum North, in Trafford Park, Greater Manchester. The company also produced a behind-the-scenes video explaining how the calendar was made.

The 2014 calendar had a James Bond / 007 theme. This time the calendar was launched at the bi-annual Defence Security and Equipment International (DSEi) arms fair event. Again the company produced a behind-the-scenes video.

The 2015 calendar had a "tongue-in-cheek take on the life of a soldier" as its theme. The launch party was held on 21 October 2014 at The Milton Club, Deansgate, Manchester. In attendance were the Mancunian boxers Ricky Hatton, Scott Quigg, Anthony Crolla and Marcus Morrison.

Mad Max was the theme of the 2016 calendar and was launched at the DSEi.

2017's theme was Operation Desert Fox.

== Controversies ==
The photo shoot for the 2015 calendar sparked a security scare when it was claimed that the pictures had been taken at Camp Williams without permission from the Utah National Guard and a promotional video of the calendar expressed thanks to the "Soldiers of the 19th Special Forces Group." Lt. Col. Steven Fairbourn of the Utah National Guard said that an investigation had been launched, he also said that The Utah Department of Public Safety believes that two of its officers appeared in the video wearing agency uniforms, in violation of agency policies. In an interview for ABC News' Good Morning America the calendar's founder Michael Newman said, "This is not about me, it's not about the calendar. It's not about any of that. This whole project is to raise money for wounded servicemen and women."

== Models ==
- Giorgia Rosella
- Kelly Hall
- Rosie Jones
- Daisy Watts
- Jessica Davies
- Joey Fisher
- Emma Glover
- Melissa 'Lissy' Cunningham
- Cindy Prado
- Lauren Rhodes
- Zienna Eve
- Sophie Howard
- Holly Peers
- Lucy Pinder
- India Reynolds
- Rhian Sugden
- Danni Wells
- Sam Cooke
- Emily O'Hara
- Charlotte McKenna
- Stacey Massey
- Katie Marie-Cork
- Sophie Reade
- Amanda Harrington
- Amii Grove

== See also ==
- Page 3
