= Notting Hill Press =

Former British publishing company

- Founded: 2012
- Founders: Michele Gorman, Belinda Jones, Talli Roland
- Country of origin: United Kingdom
- Fiction genres: Fiction, chick lit
- Official website: nottinghillpress.co.uk

Notting Hill Press, founded in 2012 by authors Michele Gorman, Belinda Jones and Talli Roland, was a British book publisher.

Notting Hill Press published authors such as Chrissie Manby, Matt Dunn, and Nick Spalding to offer writers "the third way".

Describing itself as a hybrid publishing model that combined the best of traditional and independent publishing, Notting Hill Press allowed authors to maintain the solid working relationships they have with their traditional publishers, while also recognising that some books are better-suited to independent publishing in some situations.

Notting Hill Press was a chick lit, romantic comedy imprint and stated that it does not accept submissions from authors or their agents.

Notting Hill Press was disbanded in 2020.
