= The Seventeenth Kind =

The Seventeenth Kind is a science-fiction comedy short film, an adaptation by director Andy Collier of a short story by Michael Marshall Smith that satirises The Shopping Channel. It stars Tony Curran, Sylvester McCoy, Brian Blessed, Lucy Pinder, Ralph Brown, and Miriam Margolyes. It was released in 2014.

== Critical reception ==
Reviews for the film have been positive. Dave Ollerton of the London Film Review called the film "a very funny, highly entertaining and excellently crafted 30-minute film that doesn’t drag once" and "sterling stuff". Paul Simpson of Sci-Fi Bulletin said that the film was "a highly entertaining sharp tale".
