= Come On England =

Football single by band 4-4-2

Single by 4-4-2
- Released: 7 June 2004
- Genre: Football, novelty
- Length: 4:17
- Label: Gut
- Composers: Kevin Rowland, "Big" Jim Paterson, Billy Adams
- Lyricists: Steve Fox, Lindsey Stead, Rob McCewan
- Producer: Gavin Monaghan

"Come On England" is a music single by the band 4-4-2. The song is a re-working of the Dexys Midnight Runners hit "Come On Eileen". A football-themed song, it was released on 7 June 2004 to coincide with the England national team's appearance at the European Championships. It entered the UK Singles Chart at number two, held off the number-one spot by "I Don't Wanna Know" by Mario Winans.

4-4-2 consisted of Phil Doleman (banjo), Mark 'madfiddler' Knight (fiddle), Jimmy McCafferty (drums), Ian Murphy (lead vocals), Neil Murray (backing vocals), Micky Quinn (guest vocals), Lucy Wills (trumpet). The band appeared on the U.K. TV shows CD:UK and Top of the Pops to promote the single.

== Music video ==
The video features the popular glamour models Lucy Pinder and Michelle Marsh.

== Charts ==
=== Weekly charts ===
Chart (2004)	Peak position
Scotland Singles (Official Charts)	12
UK Singles (Official Charts)	2
UK Indie (Official Charts)	1

=== Year-end charts ===
Chart (2004)	Position
UK Singles (OCC)	81

== See also ==
- "Three Lions"
- "World in Motion"
