= My Legendary Girlfriend (novel) =

1998 novel by Mike Gayle

- First edition
- Author: Mike Gayle
- Language: English
- Genre: Comedy; Lad lit
- Publisher: Hodder & Stoughton
- Publication date: 1998
- Publication place: United Kingdom
- Pages: 352
- ISBN: 0-340-92329-6
- Followed by: Mr. Commitment

My Legendary Girlfriend (1998) is the first novel by Birmingham born lad lit writer Mike Gayle. It follows the story of Will Kelly who is still in love with his first proper girlfriend.
