= Holly Peers =

British model

- Born: Holly Jade Peers; 30 July 1986 (age 40); Salford, Greater Manchester, England
- Occupation: Glamour model
- Years active: 2009–present
- Modelling information
- Height: 5 ft 7 in (1.70 m)
- Hair colour: Brunette
- Eye colour: Blue-green

Holly Jade Peers (born 30 July 1986) is an English glamour model born in Salford, Greater Manchester, England.

She began modelling in 2009 when she was discovered by Alison Webster, photographer for The Sun newspaper, after appearing in the local press for a charity march through Manchester city centre to raise money for SOS (Support Our Soldiers). Holly soon started appearing in The Sun's Page 3 (where she is known as Hollie Peers).

She modelled for Page 3, and she also appeared in magazines such as Nuts and Loaded. Peers was at No. 6 in the "Nuts 100 Sexiest Babes 2010". She was also on the front cover of the 2011 and 2012 Page 3 calendars and the 2012 Hot Shots Calendar.

Holly appeared as a "Soccerette" model on Sky TV's Soccer AM television show in 2010. On the show, she revealed that she is fan of the Manchester City football team.

In 2018, she was banned from driving for 12 months as she was stopped for illegally driving her Fiat 500 car onto the lane of the M60 motorway in Greater Manchester which had been closed off due to roadworks. She was also over the legal alcohol limit.

Latterly in her career, she has modelled for several clothing brands and other websites. In recent years she has appeared on the PinupFiles, May Contain Girl, Onlytease and BodyInMind websites.
