= Lists of Playboy models =

This is a list of lists of models photographed for Playboy magazine.

- List of Playboy Playmates of the Month
- List of people in Playboy 1980–1989
- List of people in Playboy 2000–2009

== See also ==
- Playboy Playmate
- List of glamour models
