= Michele Gorman =

American-born British author

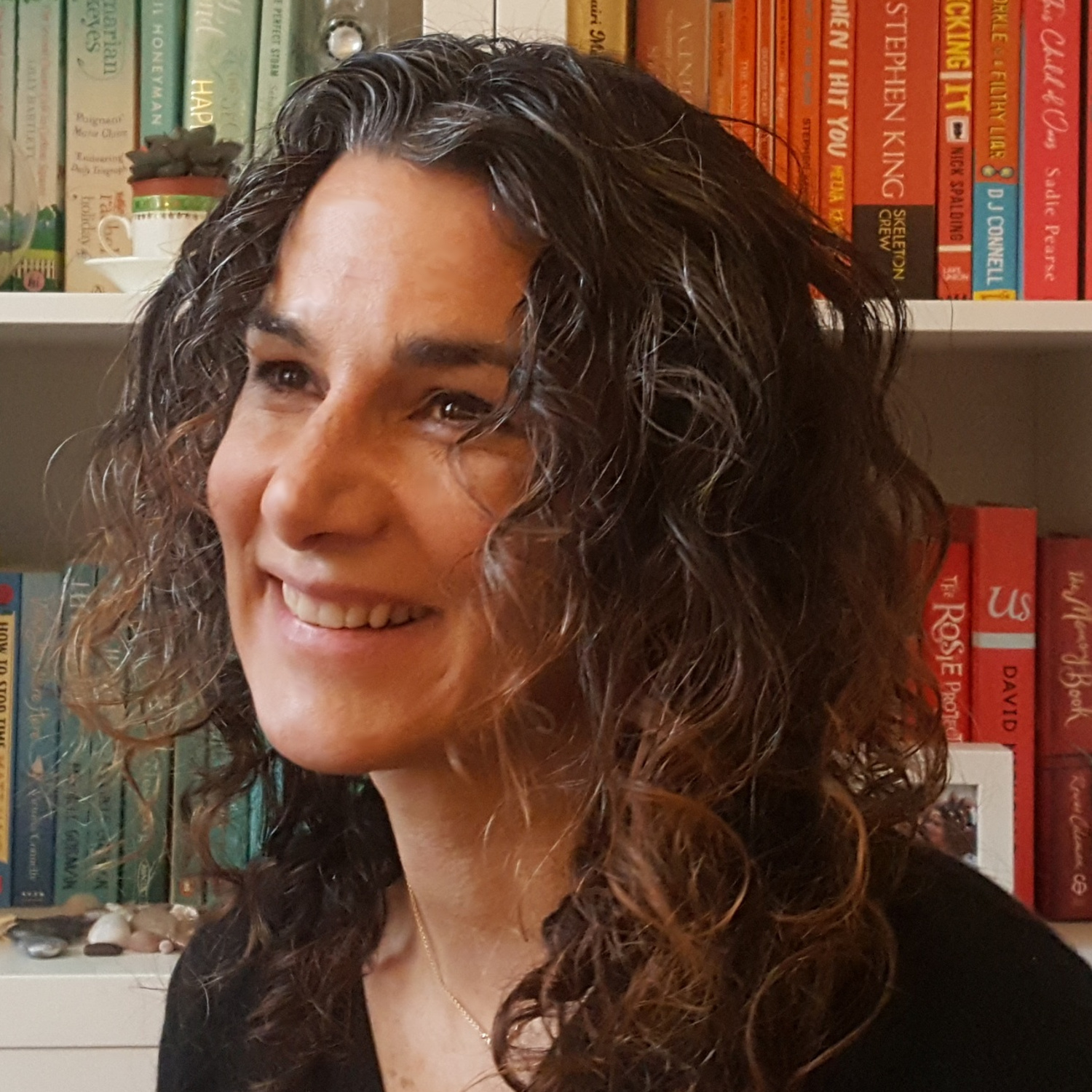
- Gorman in 2019
- Born: Pittsfield, Massachusetts, United States
- Education: University of Massachusetts Amherst, University of Illinois at Chicago
- Occupation: Author
- Writing career
- Pen name: Lilly Bartlett
- Genres: Chick lit, fiction
- Notable works: Single in the City; The Curvy Girls Club; The Big Little Wedding in Carlton Square; The Staycation
- Website: michelegorman.co.uk

Michele Gorman is an American-born British author.

Gorman is represented by Hardman & Swainson. Her debut, Single in the City, was published by Penguin Books; Gorman has now published more than a dozen books with Notting Hill Press in the US and Orion/Trapeze and HarperCollins in the UK and the rest of the world. She also writes cosy romantic comedies under the pen-name Lilly Bartlett.

== Career ==
Gorman was raised in Pittsfield, Massachusetts, and her background is financial rather than literary. She went back to school full-time in Chicago for her master's degree in Sociology. In 1998 she moved to London where she worked as a market analyst for more than a decade.

Her first book, Single in the City, was published by Penguin Books in June 2010. In 2014 she signed with Avon (publisher), an imprint of HarperCollins and in 2017 she moved to HarperImpulse for the publication of her Lilly Bartlett pen-named books. In 2020 she signed with Orion/Trapeze for the publication of The Staycation. Today she is a full-time author living in London.

In 2012, Gorman joined forces with fellow chick lit authors Talli Roland and Belinda Jones to found Notting Hill Press.

== Books ==
- Gorman, Michele (2010). Single in the City. Penguin Books. ISBN 9780141048260.
- Gorman, Michele (2012). Misfortune Cookie. Notting Hill Press. ISBN 9781478248767.
- Gorman, Michele (2012). Twelve Days to Christmas. Notting Hill Press. ISBN 9781479103676.
- Gorman, Michele (2013). Life Change. Notting Hill Press. ISBN 9781481277693.
- Gorman, Michele (2013). Christmas Carol. Notting Hill Press. ISBN 9781492242611.
- Gorman, Michele (2014). Perfect Girl. Notting Hill Press. ISBN 9781499179330.
- Gorman, Michele (2015). The Curvy Girls Club. HarperCollins. ISBN 9781499179330.
- Gorman, Michele (2016). Match Me If You Can. HarperCollins. ISBN 9780007585663.
- Gorman, Michele (2016). Love is a Four-Legged Word. Notting Hill Press. ISBN 9781539062165.
- Bartlett, Lilly (2017). The Big Little Wedding in Carlton Square. HarperCollins. ISBN 9780008226589.
- Bartlett, Lilly (2017). The Second Chance Cafe in Carlton Square. HarperCollins. ISBN 9780008226602.
- Bartlett, Lilly (2017). The Big Dreams Beach Hotel. HarperCollins. ISBN 9780008226626.
- Bartlett, Lilly (2017). Christmas at the Falling-Down Guesthouse. Notting Hill Press. ISBN 9781502736253.
