= Matt Dunn (author) =

British novelist

- Born: 1966 (age 59–60) United Kingdom
- Occupation: Novelist
- Language: English
- Genre: Fiction, romantic comedy

Matt Dunn (born Margate, England, in 1966) is a British romantic comedy novelist. He was educated at Chatham House Grammar School in Ramsgate, and then read Sports Science at Brighton Polytechnic (now the University of Brighton).

His second novel, The Ex-Boyfriend's Handbook, was shortlisted for both the Romantic Novel of the Year Award. It subsequently became a best-seller in the UK (and as an e-book in the United States), and was optioned for sitcom development by CBS.

In 2008, he contributed to the anthology of true stories The Best Day of My Life, along with James Corden, Allan Carr, Phil Greening, and novelists Sophie Kinsella, Mike Gayle, Jenny Colgan, and Kate Harrison.

He has also written about life, love, and relationships for The Times, The Guardian, Daily Express, Mail On Sunday, Metro, and The Sun, and magazines including Cosmopolitan, Company, Glamour, Elle, and Scarlet.

He was a visiting lecturer on London Metropolitan University's Creative Writing Degree, and has taught a number of shorter writing courses at various festivals and events.

== Bibliography ==
- Pug Actually (2021)
- Then I Met You (2019)
- At the Wedding (2018)
- 13 Dates (2017)
- A Christmas Day at the Office (2016)
- Home (2015)
- What Might Have Been (2014)
- A Day at the Office (2013)
- The Accidental Proposal (2011)
- The Good Bride Guide (2009)
- Ex-Girlfriends United (2008)
- From Here To Paternity (2007)
- The Ex-Boyfriend’s Handbook (2006)
- Best Man (February 2005)

== See also ==
- Notting Hill Press
