= UNILAD =

British internet media company

- Website type: Media, entertainment and online news
- Available in: English
- Owner: The LADbible Group Ltd
- Founders: Alex Partridge, Jamie Street
- Website: www.unilad.com
- Launched: 2 April 2010; 16 years ago 2014; 12 years ago (relaunch)
- Current status: Online

UNILAD is a British Internet media company and website owned by LADbible Group. The company markets itself as "a primary platform for youngsters for breaking news and relatable viral content", and has offices in London and Manchester. UNILAD was shut down in 2012 but was relaunched in 2014 under new owners Liam Harrington and Sam Bentley. The company has since developed into a media network that creates and licenses original content.

The company has a primary channel as well as eight sub-channels that specialise in technology, travel, and other topics. UNILAD's Facebook page had 17 million followers in 2016, with 2.7 billion monthly video views, second to BuzzFeed's "Tasty" channel in views. In October 2018, UNILAD was bought out by LADbible.

== Site creation and ownership ==
Alex Partridge from Eastbourne and Jamie Street, a student at the University of Plymouth, created the original website. According to an FAQ on the website in 2010, the site was "created, designed and written by Alex Partridge", then a 21-year-old student at Oxford Brookes University. Street, then a web design student at the University of Plymouth, managed technical aspects of the site, claiming that he was "not responsible for writing or checking the content that gets published". In 2014, Liam Harrington and Sam Bentley acquired ownership of the brand name and inherited its Facebook page.

== Rape-themed content ==
The 2010 website described itself as being "for when you are bored in the library" and "the 'tongue in cheek', article based solution to library boredom". In addition, UNILAD also described itself as the "number one university student lad's magazine". The site also set up a "Uni Ladette" page with "debauched disasters" from a "borderline alcoholic" female writer that they supposedly found in "a gutter, muttering something about needing to get laid and nursing her broken stilettos".

The site attracted considerable critical comment in the press and on Twitter due to perceived promotion of rape in some of the articles on the website. Articles that have been reported on in the press include:

- "Sexual Mathematics" – said that 75% of women aged 18–25 were "sluts" and advised readers that if a woman did not display any interest in having sex (which they described as "spreading for your head"), "think about this mathematical statistic: 85 per cent of rape cases go unreported. That seems to be fairly good odds." The article concluded with a mock disclaimer: "Uni Lad does not condone rape without saying 'surprise'."
- "The Zebra Abortion" – described how, following sex, the writer told his sexual partner to take the morning-after pill. After hearing she wanted to keep the pregnancy, the writer considers "performing an elbow drop on her vagina right there and then", but decides instead to "look around the room for a chair or table I can smash onto her stomach".
- "How to Pull a Fresher" – gave advice on how to sleep with a freshman, noting that they are "especially vulnerable".
- "The Angry Shag" – described the story of a man who, during sex, smashes a woman's face into a wall "to knock some sense into her".

The website also contained a shop section that sold T-shirts with a variety of slogans, including a rape-themed T-shirt in the style of the World War II–era Keep Calm and Carry On propaganda posters reading "Keep Calm – It Won't Take Long". Estelle Hart from the National Union of Students said that articles on the website promoted a "casual trivialisation of rape". Hart argued that "a website referring to women as wenches and slags isn't simply the harmless 'banter' the writers want us to believe". A number of student newspapers published editorials condemning Uni Lad including those at the University of Bristol, the University of Birmingham, the University of Liverpool, and Newcastle University. The BBC Radio 4 magazine show Woman's Hour interviewed a number of female students in Brighton who described the 'Sexual Mathematics' article as "vulgar" and were very critical of sexist comments and 'banter' on Facebook.

Sarah McAlpine wrote an article for The F-Word, a UK feminist blog, which argued that Uni Lad was "an entire culture summed up in one hideous website". The website TechRadar listed it as one of the "10 most hated websites of all time". Following the public reaction, Partridge from Uni Lad said that the site "overstepped the mark" and "took things too far", and claimed that he was taking the site down until they "greatly improved" their editorial policies. The University of Plymouth launched a disciplinary investigation against Street who claimed to be the designer of the site but not involved in the content. The University of Plymouth Students' Union released a statement saying that there "can be no question that some of the content published on the Uni Lad website is completely unacceptable and offensive in nature", but stating that they would not make any further comment on the matter due to the investigation that the university was leading.

== New ownership and misconduct allegations ==
The brand was acquired by entrepreneurs Liam Harrington and Sam Bentley in 2014. The rebranded UNILAD launched in 2014 at unilad.co.uk. The UNILAD Facebook page, inherited in 2014 with 300,000 fans, grew to have 11.5 million Facebook likes by 2016, with a web presence at unilad.co.uk. Harrington and Bentley stated that they decline to publish some submitted content due to backlash, and The Guardian observed that its content differs significantly from that of the previous iteration of the website. The site is described as having a reputation for "trivial lad-focused videos", with titles such as "5 On 5 Fighting Is Back And It's F*cking Brutal."

In October 2018, the company that owned UNILAD went into administration, with owners Harrington and Bentley having incurred debts of £6.5 million and owing taxes of £1.5 million, alongside being plagued by allegations of continued misogynistic, homophobic, and transphobic employee misconduct; fraud; and cocaine use, particularly from a website run by an ex-employee titled "uniladexposed", despite efforts to sanitize the site's brand image. A day later, managing director John Quinlan denied reports that it had gone into administration, saying the brand is "doing better than ever" and that he was "confident" that a buyer would be found. Also in October 2018, a few days after it went into administration, UNILAD was bought by LADbible for an undisclosed fee.
