= Maria Eriksson =

English model

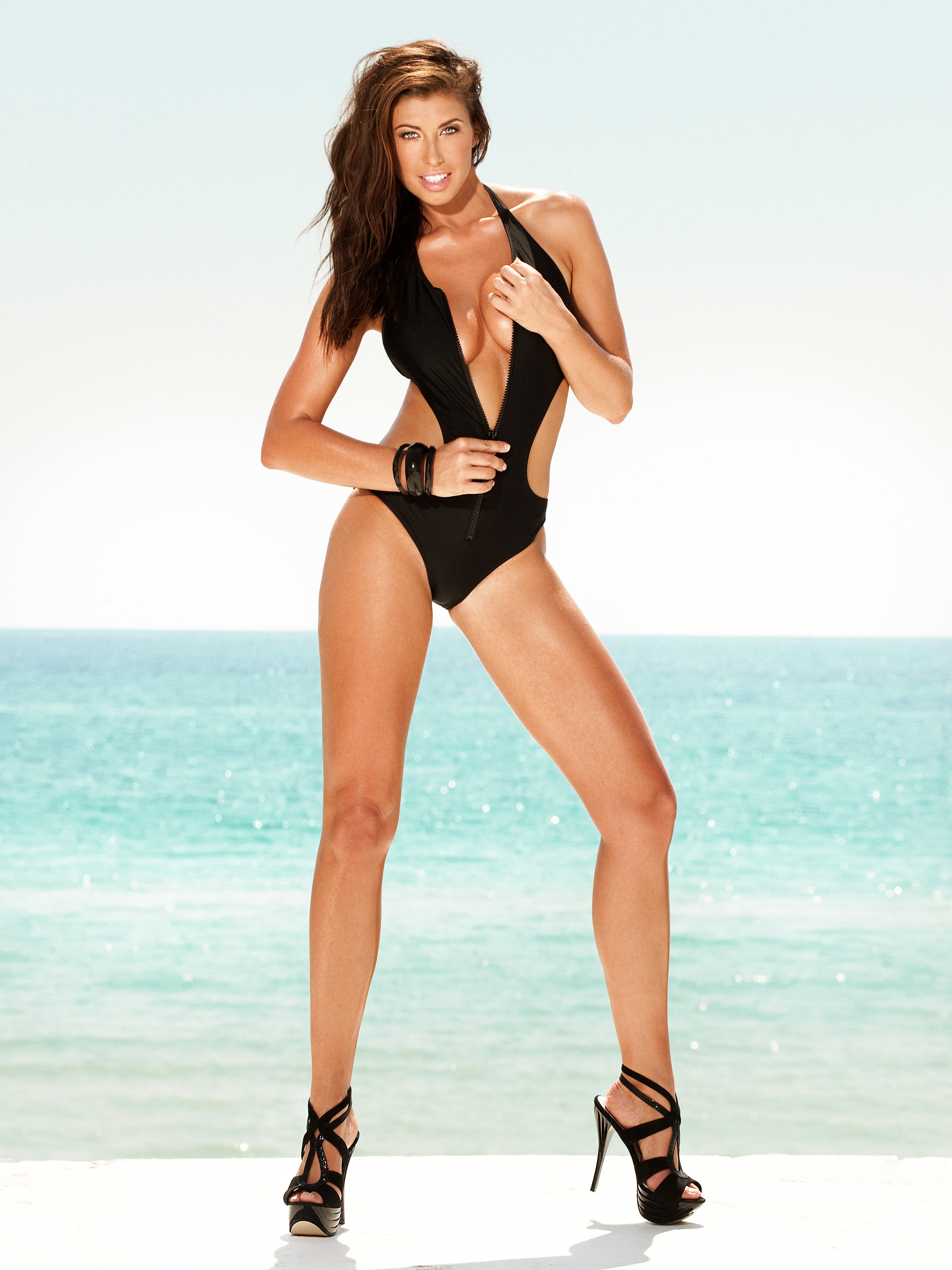
- Photo shoot in Miami, 2010
- Born: 29 July 1982 (age 44); Leeds, West Yorkshire, England
- Occupation: Model
- Years active: 2009–present
- Modelling information
- Height: 5 ft 10 in (1.78 m)
- Hair colour: Brown
- Eye colour: Blue

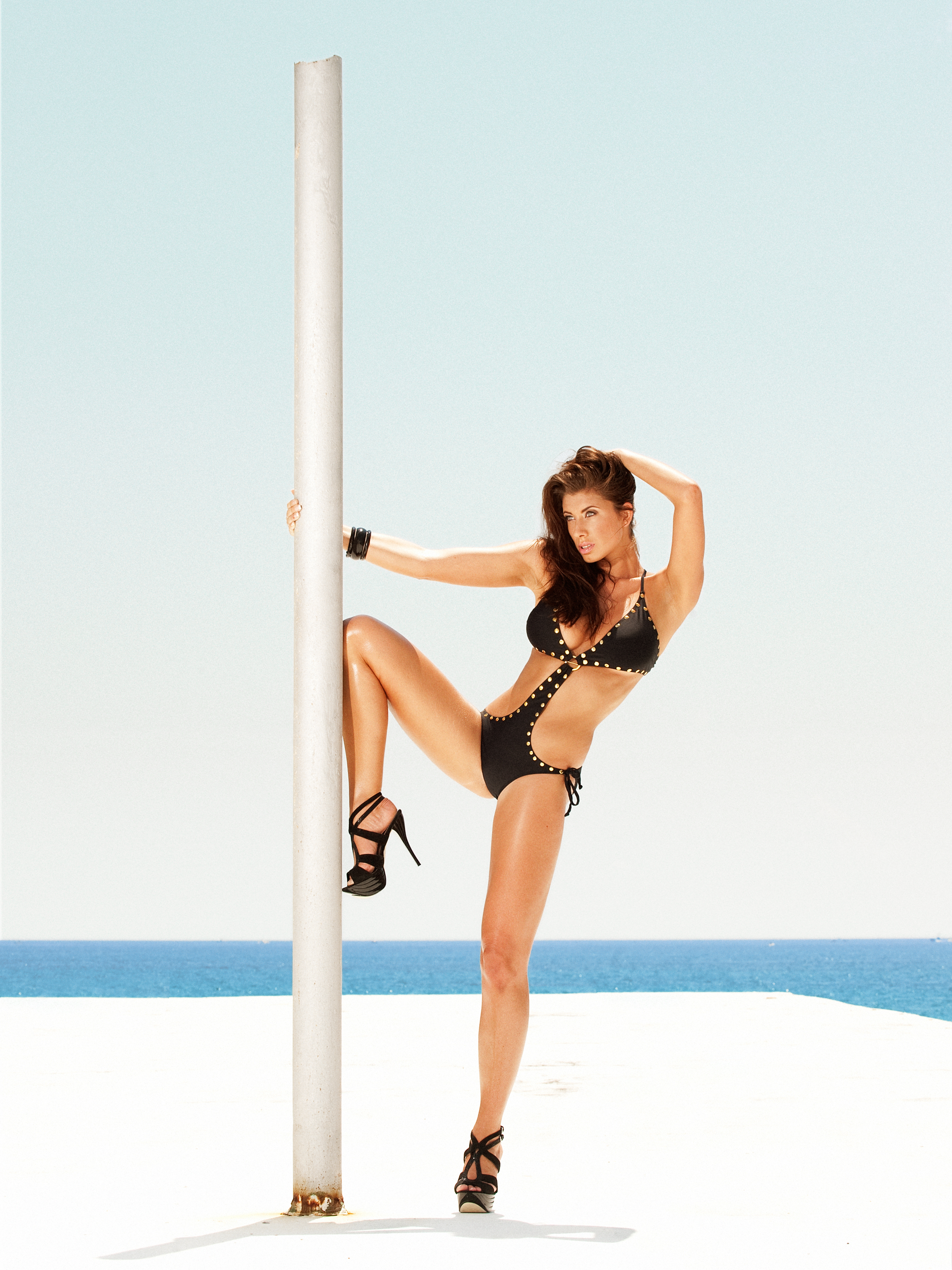
Maria Eriksson in Miami, 2010

Maria Eriksson (born 29 July 1982) is an English fashion and glamour model.

She is one of the few models from outside the United States to attain a special Green Card due to her "extraordinary ability career".

== Early life ==
Maria Eriksson was born and raised near Leeds, West Yorkshire in the north of England. Her family is English with some Austrian descent. Eriksson has a bachelor's degree from Newcastle University and a master's degree from the University of York.

Eriksson had no intention of becoming a model but after completing her undergraduate degree, worked for a short time in London as a house model for top London designers Bellville Sassoon and Zandra Rhodes.

Eriksson stopped modelling to become a full-time science teacher teaching physics, biology and chemistry. She soon found herself missing the glamour of the modelling world and decided to return to modelling. Eriksson returned to the world of full-time modelling and has been in constant demand since 2009.

== Modelling career ==
Eriksson is a three-time Playboy Playmate, which she has achieved in three countries on three separate continents (Croatia, Singapore and South Africa). She has also appeared in numerous magazines including FHM in Singapore and People in Australia; and has made several appearances in Playboy’s Special Editions. She has appeared in both the Malaysian (in 2011) and Indonesian (2013) editions of FHM. In 2012 the Mexican edition of Maxim flew Eriksson to Mexico to do the photography for what became a six-page spread.

Eriksson was the cover girl and Playboy Playmate in the Croatian edition of the magazine in February 2010. These numerous Playboy appearances led her to make the list of Playboy’s Top 100 Sexiest Women of 2010. March 2015 saw Maria Eriksson again as cover model for Playboy Croatia, along with an 8-page feature.

Eriksson was the cover girl and had a seven-page spread in the February 2011 edition of FHM Indonesia in 2011. She appeared in the inaugural (April 2011) edition of South African Playboy. Further, she was the second Playmate (Miss June 2011) in Singapore's Playboy entitled VIP. She is also a columnist for the Indonesian edition of FHM.

In August 2013, she achieved another Playboy centerfold when she featured in the South African edition of the magazine. In 2015, she attained a Green Card to reside permanently in the United States.

=== Published writer ===
Maria is also a published writer and her articles have appeared in magazines such as South African Playboy, FHM Indonesia and popular modelling website Model Mayhem. She has also written an e-book "Glamour Modeling Uncovered", in which she imparts her knowledge and experience of the industry from her worldwide modelling career.

=== Video and TV ===
Eriksson also appears in the video for the song Cross My Heart by British rap artist Skepta.

=== Modelling work ===
- Bellville Sassoon
- Zandra Rhodes
- FHM Singapore
- People (Australia)
- Playboy
- Playboy Special Edition
- Playboy Book of Lingerie
- Playboy's Natural Beauties
- Croatian Playboy
- Jadran Hosiery, Zagreb
- RTL Television
- Pasella, South Africa
- La Senza
- La Perla
- London Fashion Week
- AutoKlub magazine
- Jutarnji list newspaper
