= Belinda Jones (writer) =

English writer (1967–2024)

- Born: Belinda Cheryl Jones; 20 December 1967; Tunbridge Wells, Kent, England, United Kingdom
- Died: 1 December 2024 (aged 56)
- Occupation: Novelist
- Writing career
- Period: 1997–2024
- Genre: Fiction
- Website: belindajones.com

Belinda Cheryl Jones (20 December 1967 – 1 December 2024) was an English writer.

== Biography ==
Jones was born in Royal Tunbridge Wells, Kent to parents Pamela (née Gwyther) and Trefor Jones. She grew up in Exeter, Devon, and studied at the London College of Printing. Her first job was on the children's comic, Postman Pat. At the age of 20, she moved on to become a feature writer on Woman's World. She spent four years working on More! magazine as a feature writer. She has had work published in Elle, Empire, FHM, Bliss, Company, and Cosmopolitan. In 1997 she moved to Los Angeles, but later returned to the UK where she wrote her successful first novel, Divas Las Vegas. Her second novel was I Love Capri. In 2009 she switched publisher from the Arrow imprint of Random House to Hodder.

Jones was the co-founder of Notting Hill Press with authors Talli Roland and Michele Gorman.

Her novels mainly fall into the women's fiction or "chick lit" categories, and usually combine romance and travel. On the Road to Mr. Right is an autobiographical travelogue.

Jones died on 1 December 2024 after a short battle with cancer.

== Bibliography ==
- 2001 – Divas Las Vegas
- 2002 – I Love Capri
- 2003 – The California Club
- 2004 – On the Road to Mr. Right
- 2005 – The Paradise Room
- 2006 – Cafe Tropicana
- 2007 – The Love Academy
- 2008 – Out of the Blue
- 2010 – Living La Vida Loca
- 2011 – California Dreamers aka Hollywood Calling
- 2012 – Winter Wonderland'
- 2014 – The Travelling Tea Shop
- 2018 – Bodie on the Road: Travels with a Rescue Pup in the Dogged Pursuit of Happiness (Skyhorse)
