= Belinda Jones (pianist) =

English pianist

Belinda Jones is an English classical pianist.

== Biography ==
Born in London, Belinda studied at Chetham's School of Music, the Royal Academy of Music and the Royal College of Music, with teachers Ryzard Bakst, Ronan o Hora, Patsy Toh, Simon Lepper and Roger Vignoles.

She is active as a soloist, member of various chamber ensembles and accompanist to singers and instrumentalists. Awards include the MBF Accompaniment award at the Maggie Teyte competition, prizes in the Lies Askonas, Major Van der Pump and RCM Schumann competitions and full scholarships at conservatoires.

She has performed in major venues and series including Wigmore Hall, Cadogan Hall and the Moscow Festival and collaborated with artists including violinist Ning Feng and Jarvis Cocker.
