= Malene Espensen =

Danish glamour model

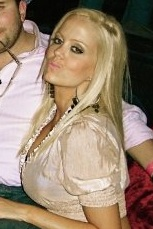
- Espensen in 2010
- Born: 30 June 1981 (age 44); Copenhagen, Denmark
- Occupation: Glamour model
- Modeling information
- Hair color: Blonde
- Eye color: Blue
- Website: malene.uk

Malene Espensen (born 30 June 1981) is a Danish glamour model who resides and works in the United Kingdom. Espensen has appeared as a Page 3 or pin-up girl in a number of tabloid newspapers, such as The Sun and Daily Star; and men's magazines including FHM, Playboy and M!. She was also the PinupFiles model of the month in July 2017.

She has also had a minor guest role in the British science series Brainiac: Science Abuse.
