= Stories We Could Tell (novel) =

2005 book by Tony Parsons

Stories We could Tell
- First edition
- Author: Tony Parsons
- Language: English
- Publisher: HarperCollins
- Publication date: 2005
- Publication place: United Kingdom
- Media type: Print (hardback & paperback)
- Pages: 342
- ISBN: 978-0-00-715126-4

Stories We Could Tell is a novel by Tony Parsons, published in 2005. It is set on a single night in August 1977, the night Elvis Presley died. It focuses on the adventures of three men, Terry, Ray, and Leon, all writers for the fictional musical magazine The Paper in pre-Thatcherite punk-ridden London. Parsons covers topics that deal with the role of music for young people, youth gangs and music culture in this time.

== Plot ==
The three main characters work at a music paper called The Paper. In the one night the story takes place, they all grow up in one way or another.

Terry Warboys returns from an interview with veteran musician Dag Wood in Berlin who is coming for a visit to London to meet Terry and his girlfriend Misty. She disappears with Dag for the night, so Terry does lots of drugs, sleeps with another woman and wants to kill himself. In the end it turns out that Misty and Dag just talked and Misty is pregnant by Terry. They are engaged at the end of the novel.

Ray Keeley is a young music lover who does not like the new punk music, but sticks to 1960s music. The editor tells him that his only chance to keep his job on The Paper is to find and interview his idol John Lennon, who is in town for one night. Ray starts searching for him, falls in love with a woman, and in the end finds Lennon after a long, sleepless night. The interview turns out great and he can keep his job.

The experience of the Battle of Lewisham the previous week before has made a huge impact on promising student turned squat resident Leon Peck. His political idealism as the editor of left-wing magazine Red Mist leads to insulting reviews, which eventually get him into trouble with the Dagenham Dogs, a gang of skinhead thugs. To escape them he runs into a disco to hide and meets the girl of his dreams. They spend the night together in his squat, which gets shut down this very night. After running away he writes an article about a concert he was supposed to be at. In the end it turns out the concert did not take place and Leon loses his job. He moves back in with his parents.

== Characters ==
=== Terry Warboys ===
Terry Warboys is an 18-year-old writer at The Paper. His outward appearance, Doc Martins, leather jacket, Levis marking him a follower of the new music, hides his rather common and decent character. He basically wants to be loved, his parents, his girl-friend and the musicians he meets. Terry returns from Berlin where he has interviewed veteran musician Dag Wood, a character modeled on Iggy Pop. In the following night Terry introduces his girl-friend Misty to Dag, whom he adores, mostly because his article on Dag ends on the cover of The Paper, on a gig in the “Western World” in Covent Garden. That turns out to be a mistake because a few moments later, Misty is gone with Dag. He fears that Misty cheats on him. With his friends Leon and Ray he flees a group of skinheads and confused and ashamed, high on drugs and jealousy sleeps with a girl, visits his father at Smithfield meat market and asks him for money so that he can buy more drugs. By chance Terry meets Misty again in a hotel with Dag Wood. Terry wants to believe her innocence so the two take their way home. In the car Terry finds out that he will become a father. After the first shock Terry takes responsibility for the baby, although the encounter with Misty's family reveals that Misty lied to him about her background. Not absolutely sure whether this night turned out right for him he and Misty sit on a train locked together by accident with her pink fake mink fur handcuffs.

=== Leon ===
Leon is an idealist. As a writer Leon is not only interested in reporting and reviewing music. Especially after his experiences at the Lewisham riots he is convinced that right-wing groups are a real danger and need to be fought. Thus he produces and sells the left-wing political magazine Red Mist. He also quit his studies and now lives in a squat believing that he is among people who do something to change things.

His outspoken articles cause trouble when he reviews a concert of the band Leni and the Riefenstahls and its audience very negatively and the fans of that band, the skinhead Dagenham Dogs want to hunt and punish him. Again now Leon has to write an article about a concert of Leni and the Riefenstahls. As he flees the Dagenham Dogs, he hides in a disco called the Goldmine where he sees a girl he immediately falls in love with, hairdresser Ruby. A group of teds rescues him later that night when the Dogs start to beat him up, but having missed the concert, because he took Ruby to his squat for the night, and still having written a review, he loses his job. As the squat is sealed off he has to return to his parents’ house but he seems to have made peace with his father, whom he considered an out-of-reach rival.

=== Ray Keeley ===
Ray Keeley is a 1960s music lover. He has long blond hair and wears a denim jacket, white jeans and cowboy boots.

Together with his family, he moved from Hong Kong to London where he didn't feel quite at home. Only music and writing for “the Paper” make him happy.

The past three years, since he was fifteen, he has been heading north to interview bands and write about them. Ray is very loyal to the music of the Beatles and not willing to change with it. He owns a record collection which means the world to him. Especially his younger brother Robbie, with whom he shares a room, isn't allowed to touch them. Despite this, he is very protective of him because his older brother John died in an IRA attack. The situation in the family is poor, which is the reason why Ray is barely at home and treats it like a hotel. His father, a former police officer who listens to Winston Churchill speeches, is violent and aggressive, his mother is depressed since the death of John. As readers want to know about the new music, punk, Ray seems to be a fish out of water. “The Paper’s” chief editor, Kevin White, sends Ray to find and interview John Lennon, who is supposed to stay in London for that night. If Ray does not succeed he will be sacked. Eventually he manages to find and interview Lennon and subsequently get a permanent job offer.

=== Misty ===
Misty's is Terry's girlfriend. Her parents and three brothers live in a council house on a hill close to King's Cross. Still, she told Terry and all her colleagues that her dad was a lawyer and her family was quite wealthy. She is an independent, self-confident young woman who does not care much about other people. She likes to combine innocent, feminine dresses or skirts with something male like motorcycle boots or spiked dog collars. She is described to be cat-faced, tall and slim with honey-colored hair. Also, she keeps carrying a pair of pink handcuffs. Terry met her at the office of The Paper, where she works as a photographer. When Terry introduces her to Dag Wood, she soon disappears with him.

When she discovers that she is pregnant, she takes Terry to her parents’ home to show him the truth. In the end, they decide to marry, which makes Terry realize that he is not sure whether he wants to be with her for all his life.

== Author ==
Starting his career as a music journalist at NME in 1976, Parsons experienced the music business and especially the rise of punk music himself. Just like the characters in his novel he went on the road with famous bands. The first band he covered being Thin Lizzy, just as Terry Warboys in the novel. He wrote reviews on gigs and albums, interviewed artist and lost friends because of drugs. Parsons describes the time as great and exciting, but also unpredictable and filled with tragedy.

There are many similarities to the main characters. Parsons worked in Gordon's gin factory in Islington before he got into the music business while he still lived at home. He witnessed the Lewisham riot in 1977 which he considers the beginning of his relationship to his colleague Julie Burchill. With her, he got a child but she ran away seven years after his birth.

== Title ==
The book shares the same title as a song sung by John Sebastian. The lyrics of the song generally speaking deal with being young, independent and free. The narrator is looking back on “the time of his life“ in which he travelled around a lot, lived a live as a musician and just had fun. Even though he did a lot of mistakes, he enjoyed this part of his life. In this respect the semi-autobiographical elements and the novel's ending fit the mood and retrospective approach of Sebastian's song.

== Structure ==
The novel is told chronologically from three perspectives using a 3rd person selective omniscient narrator. It is divided into three different parts. The first part is called "You May Not Be An Angel“, part two is called "Angels Are So Few“ and part three is called "Another Girl. Another Planet“. The names are related to two songs: "I’ll String Along With You" by Harry Warren and "Another Girl, Another Planet" by The Only Ones. The entire events of the novel take place in one night, August 16, 1977, the night that Elvis died.

== Critical acclaim ==
The critical reviews tend to be negative. Paul Morley with The Guardian feels let down by the novel. He complains that the novel's main problem is the deformed image of the seventies. “You'd swear Tony wasn't there, as he gives bands names like Leni and the Riefenstahls and the Sewer Rats - their followers are the Dagenham Dogs. An Iggy/Keith Richards hybrid is Dag Wood. The first hint of a poppier electronic band - a Tubeway Army, or a Human League - is called Electric Baguette. This is either mild satire, or Tony has other things on his mind.“ Toby Clements from the same paper admits that Parson is capable of interweaving the different back-stories of the main male characters (“and he certainly shows some skill in assembling the friends' back-stories“) but criticises that it's hard to keep the main characters apart for the most time of the book (“even if, for the first three quarters of the novel, it is difficult to tell them apart.“

David Robson with The Daily Telegraph receives it a bit more benevolently but is still disappointed by Parsons’ writing skills. He admires the beginning (“The opening is brilliant - crisp, confident, every word counting[…]“) but at the same time he is aghast at the ending (“It is an insanely bad piece of writing and should be shown to creative writing classes as an example of how to achieve the maximum bathos with the minimum effort.“). Frustrated, Robson sums it up as “a small novel about self-centred people two-timing each other.“
