= Man and Boy (novel) =

1999 novel by Tony Parsons

- First edition
- Author: Tony Parsons
- Language: English
- Genre: Romance novel
- Publisher: HarperCollins
- Publication date: 1999
- Publication place: United Kingdom
- Media type: Print (Hardback)
- Pages: 356 pp
- ISBN: 9955-08-645-9
- Followed by: Man and Wife

Man and Boy is a 1999 novel by Tony Parsons. It was awarded the 2001 British Book of the Year award.

== Plot introduction ==
Harry Silver is a successful television producer about to turn 30. He is happily married, has a four-year-old son and drives a convertible sports car. Then he spends the night with a colleague from work and his life falls apart; his wife leaves him and emigrates to Japan, he loses his job and he has to cope with being a single parent. He also has to deal with the trauma of his father dying from cancer. While coping with these stresses in his life, he meets another woman at a coffee shop, a woman whom he has already met with her child, then they part. Harry finds a new job and eventually moves on with his life.

== TV adaptation ==
A BBC One adaptation of the book was aired in 2002 starring Ioan Gruffudd and Elizabeth Mitchell.

== Sequels ==
In 2003 a sequel was released, Man and Wife, followed in 2010 by Men From the Boys to complete the trilogy.
