= Ralph (magazine) =

Australian men's magazine

- Ralph magazine (December 2004 cover)
- Editor: Mark Dapin (1998 - 2002); Santi Pintado (2006 - 2010)
- Categories: Men's magazines
- Frequency: Monthly
- First issue: August 1997
- Final issue: July 2010
- Company: Australian Consolidated Press
- Country: Australia
- Based in: Sydney
- Language: English
- Website: ralph.ninemsn.com.au (defunct)

Ralph was an Australian men's magazine that was published monthly by ACP Magazines, a division of PBL Media between August 1997 and July 2010. The format and style of Ralph was similar to other men's magazines, such as Maxim and Loaded.

== Content ==
Similar to its rivals FHM and Zoo Weekly, Ralph published photos of scantily-clad models and female celebrities, without revealing their genitals or nipples. This allowed for the magazine to be sold in the lifestyle sections of newsagencies, and in other retailers such as department stores and supermarkets.

The magazine featured a number of recurring characters, such as Ralph Man, Frank Muddler and Gourmet Gav. Gourmet Gav, who would take on outrageous eating challenges, would earn celebrity beyond the pages of the magazine thanks to the development of Ralph TV.

Ralph featured photo shoots of Australian celebrities as well as international stars. The magazine was often cross-promoted on other ACP and PBL properties, such as promotional parties held in conjunction with Cosmopolitan, and as a sponsor of home viewer competitions during the Fox Network's rugby league coverage.

It contained the same kinds of articles published in similar titles, and ran its own poll to find "Australia's sexiest woman". The results were published in an attachment to the regular magazine each year.

== Circulation ==
Ralph had a circulation of over 100,000 in 2002, though sales began declined rapidly around 2007. In 2008 alone it lost 20 percent of its circulation, bringing it down to 66,233 copies. Its circulation was down to 63,155 at the end of 2009, with a readership of 267,000, significantly behind the market leader among men's magazines, Zoo Weekly.

On 4 June 2010, the magazine's publishing company ACP announced that Ralph would produce its final print edition at the end of the month, with the July cover date being the final monthly magazine, although the popular Girls of Ralph special issues would continue. ACP said that the Ralph website would remain, hosted on the ninemsn network and via its mobile platform. However, the Ralph website was eventually redirected to the Zoo Weekly website until that magazine also ceased publication in 2015.

The final issue of the magazine featured Clare Werbeloff in lingerie. Werbeloff became known as the Kings Cross Bogan following her eyewitness account of a shooting outside a Kings Cross nightclub, which turned out to be a hoax. The decision to feature Werbeloff was criticised by The Sunday Times, who speculated Ralph's decision to feature a "D-list wannabe celebrity" was "a real indication of how badly the mag was doing".

== Ralph TV ==
Ralph TV was a weekly television series based on Ralph magazine which aired on the Nine Network. It was hosted by Craig "Lowie" Lowe and featured a trio known as "the girls of Ralph TV", newcomers Brooke Sheehan, Candice Manning and Angela Tsun. The show aired footage of the various features and pictorials from the former monthly Ralph magazine. The premiere episode aired on 7 June 2007 and each episode was repeated on Fox8. The series was produced by Endemol Southern Star.

== See also ==
- Lad culture
