= Tony Parsons (British journalist) =

British journalist and author (born 1953)

- Born: Tony Victor Parsons; 6 November 1953 (age 72); Romford, Essex, England
- Spouses: Julie Burchill (m. 1979; div. 1984) Yuriko Parsons (m. 1992)
- Children: 2

Tony Victor Parsons (born 6 November 1953) is an English journalist, broadcaster, and author. He began his career as a music journalist for New Musical Express (NME), writing about punk music. Later he wrote for The Daily Telegraph, before going on to write for the Daily Mirror for 18 years. Since September 2013, Parsons has written a column for The Sun. He was for a time a regular guest on the BBC Two arts review programme The Late Show, and appeared infrequently on the successor Newsnight Review; he also briefly hosted a series on Channel 4 called Big Mouth.

Parsons is the author of the novel Man and Boy (1999). He had previously written a number of novels including The Kids (1976), Platinum Logic (1981) and Limelight Blues (1983). Parsons has since published a series of best-selling novels – One For My Baby (2001), Man and Wife (2003), The Family Way (2004), Stories We Could Tell (2006), My Favourite Wife (2008), Starting Over (2009), Men From the Boys (2010), Catching the Sun (2012), The Murder Bag (2014), and The Slaughter Man (2015). His novels typically deal with relationship problems, emotional dramas and the traumas of men and women in our time. He describes his writing as 'Men Lit', as opposed to the female 'Chick Lit'.

== Background ==
Born in Romford, Essex (now Greater London), he was the only child of working-class parents. His father was a former Royal Naval Commando who won the Distinguished Service Medal during the Second World War. After the war he worked as a lorry driver, market trader and greengrocer. His mother was a school dinner lady. He lived for the first five years of his life in a rented flat above a shop in Essex, before his family moved to a council house in Billericay, Essex.

Parsons attended Barstable Grammar School, Basildon (now Barstable School), which he left aged 16 with five O-levels. He worked in a series of low-paid, unskilled menial jobs before gaining employment with National Mutual Life, a city insurance company, as a computer operator. His free time while working there allowed him to develop his literary skills, and he published an underground paper called the Scandal Sheet.

== Career ==
In 1974 he began work at the Gordon's gin distillery on City Road, London, where he developed an acute gin allergy and wrote his first novel, The Kids, published by New English Library in 1976. Parsons later said that he had imagined that if he could publish a book then he would be able to make a living as a professional writer, but the £700 he made from that novel was not enough to allow him to leave the Gordon's Gin factory. However, when the weekly music magazine New Musical Express (NME) advertised for new writers in the summer of 1976, Parsons submitted his novel to the editor, Nick Logan, and was rewarded with a staff writer job. For the next three years he wrote about new music. He wrote the first cover story on the Clash and features on the Sex Pistols, Blondie, Talking Heads, the Ramones, David Bowie, Bruce Springsteen, the New York Dolls, Buzzcocks, and Led Zeppelin among others.

For most of the 1980s, Parsons struggled to make a living as a freelance writer. His career started to recover in 1990 when he wrote Bare, an authorised biography of pop star George Michael. Despite the absence of a written contract with the singer, proceeds from the book were split equally between the two men. However, they fell out in 1999 after an interview Michael had given to Parsons was published in the Daily Mirror. In the 1990s, Parsons became a regular on the live BBC panel show Late Review. He also made a series of authored documentaries for Channel 4. When Piers Morgan became editor of the Daily Mirror, Parsons was poached from The Daily Telegraph as a columnist.

In 1993, he presented a film for the British television documentary series Without Walls, focusing on the controversy surrounding the film A Clockwork Orange (1971). Director Stanley Kubrick and distributor Warner Brothers sued broadcaster Channel 4, unsuccessfully, in an attempt to prevent clips from the film being shown on television. In the programme Parsons is seen taking a cross-channel ferry from England to France to watch the film, which at the time was embargoed in Britain due to a self-imposed ban by the director.

Though it sold respectably on publication, the novel Man and Boy (1999) was a word-of-mouth success, and only reached number one in The Sunday Times bestseller list one year after publication. Man and Boy won the British Book Awards' Book of the Year Prize in 2001. It has been published in 39 languages, including Chinese for its publication in the People's Republic of China in January 2009.

In 2007, Parsons wrote a series of articles about the disappearance of Madeleine McCann from a beach in the Algarve in Portugal, in the Daily Mail. The tone with which these articles were written was later described as having a "touch of arrogant xenophobia" by The Guardian's Marcel Berlins. The Press Complaints Commission that year received 485 complaints, a huge increase in the number of complaints in comparison to previous years, his article on the McCann affair receiving the most complaints. In an article for the Daily Mirror in 2007, entitled "Oh Up Yours Senor", he said of Portugal's ambassador to Britain, Senhor António Santana Carlos, "And I would respectfully suggest that in future, if you can't say something constructive about the disappearance of little Madeleine, then you just keep your stupid, sardine-munching mouth shut".

In 2009, Parsons signed a three-book contract with HarperCollins for two further novels and a non-fiction book titled Fear of Fake Breasts. He also writes a monthly column for GQ magazine and, until August 2013, a weekly column for the Daily Mirror.

The end of his association with the Daily Mirror came at the beginning of September 2013, with Parsons reportedly leaving the title after 18 years because of a cut in its editorial budget. Less than two weeks later it was announced that he had joined The Sun on Sunday; Parsons said his previous paper was "dying" because it was giving away its content for free online.

== Views ==
Parsons has expressed in articles a strong loathing for tattoos. In the 1990s he wrote a story titled "The Tattooed Jungle", suggesting that tattoos were symptomatic of the decline of the working class. In a 2012 article for GQ magazine, he lamented the fact that in the last 20 years in Britain, tattoos had become mainstream, common among both sexes and to all economic classes; he wrote that tattoos "remain ugly, hideous daubings that make my flesh crawl with revulsion every time I see one".

He endorsed UKIP in 2014, but has been a supporter of the Conservative Party since 2015.

Parsons has taken a strident stance in support of Britain's withdrawal from the European Union for many years. In 2013, he wrote an article published in the Daily Mirror titled 'Why I am one of the millions who would not wipe their dog with the EU flag'. He was a strong advocate of Brexit in the run-up to the referendum and continues to be.

== Personal life ==
Parsons married fellow NME journalist Julie Burchill in 1979. They had both answered the same advert in the paper in 1976, requesting "hip, young gunslingers" to apply as new writers. He and Burchill collaborated on the book The Boy Looked at Johnny published in 1979. After the collapse of their marriage in 1984, periodic clashes in the media between Burchill and Parsons erupted for many years.

Parsons became a single parent caring for their four-year-old son, Robert Kennedy Parsons. The experience of being a young man caring for a small child influenced his best-selling novel Man and Boy.

Parsons' father died of cancer in 1987, and his mother died of cancer in 1999, just weeks before the publication of Man and Boy. The book is dedicated to Parsons's mother.

In 1992, Parsons married Yuriko, a Japanese translator. They have one daughter, Jasmine. He lives with his wife and daughter in London.
