= New Man (gender stereotype) =

Gender stereotype in 1980s and 1990s Britain

The new man or nineties man was a media-created archetype of male behaviour, widely discussed in mass media in the United Kingdom in the late 1980s and 1990s. The new man was typically represented – positively or negatively – as a heterosexual man who combined two principal characteristics: a concern for style and personal grooming with broadly pro-feminist attitudes.

From the early 1990s, the concept of the "new lad" emerged in deliberate contrast to the new man; the dominant lad culture of the later 1990s was often explained as a male backlash against the undesirable effeminacy of the new man.

Gender-studies academics such as Rosalind Gill have seen the discourse around the new man and the new lad as marking a significant moment of social change, when masculinity was for the first time very widely and openly discussed, rather than being understood as the "invisible, unmarked norm of human existence and experience."

== See also ==
- Alpha and beta male
- Chad (slang)
- Dandy
- Fop
- Metrosexual
- Ikemen
- Macaroni (fashion)
