= Sophie Howard (model) =

English glamour model (born 1983)

- Born: Sophie Amanda Howard; 24 February 1983 (age 43); Southport, England
- Occupation: Glamour model
- Height: 5 ft 8 in (1.73 m)

Sophie Monaghan (born Sophie Amanda Howard; 24 February 1983) is a former glamour model from Southport, England. She appeared regularly on Page 3 and in men's magazines such as Maxim, Nuts and Loaded. In August 2005, Howard was voted 73rd in the FHM UK "100 Sexiest Women" poll. In the 2006 poll, she rose to 68th place.

== Biography and career ==
Sophie Amanda Howard was born and raised in Southport, Merseyside, England.

She later moved to Ellesmere Port, Cheshire. She attended Christ the King Catholic High School and was in The Salvation Army until she was 16.

Howard studied English at Edge Hill University in Ormskirk, Lancashire. During this time, she signed to the IMM modelling agency and subsequently appeared in Loaded in its "Almost Famous" and "Sauna Babes" sections.

Howard subsequently signed a contract with Loaded, resulting in a relationship advice column and a regular feature called "Sophie's Choice". As of 2006, She was signed to Nuts magazine for about 18 months. In 2006, Howard's management (IMM) also signed an exclusive, 12-month deal (for 2007) with Dennis Publishing for Sophie to frequently feature in Maxim and Bizarre.

In 2009, Howard returned to Edge Hill University to study for a degree in mental health nursing. She took a break from modelling in December 2011 in order to focus solely on her studies, before returning to modelling in March 2013.

Howard has since married and retired from modelling.

== Personal life ==
As of 2013, she has retired from modelling.

Whilst studying at Sixth form, Howard was diagnosed with Lupus erythematosus, a condition affecting the immune system.

== See also ==
- Lupus
