= Emily Horne =

British bigamist

- Born: 9 December 1978 (age 47); York, North Yorkshire, United Kingdom
- Spouses: 7

Emily Horne (born 9 December 1978) is a British woman, best known for being a multiple bigamist after her well-publicised marriages to six men without informing them of her previous marriages and without ever legally divorcing any of them. Horne has been tried and sentenced twice for bigamy. She later changed her name by deed poll and is known as Maxine-Accastes Quiberberon.

== Life ==
After finishing high school, Horne went on to studies in physics and electronics at Leeds Metropolitan University. She was accepted onto the course but never started it.

Horne married her first husband, Paul Rigby, in December 1996 at the age of 18 while she was on leave from the Royal Irish Regiment, then while living in Leeds in 1999 she married Sean Cunningham, without divorcing Rigby. In late 1999 she worked for a short time in Norway, leaving her second husband in the process, but when her Norwegian lover left her, she returned to the United Kingdom. She later worked as a glamour model and escort, as well as appearing in adult films.

Her third husband was Chris Barratt. She left Leeds for Ipswich in 2002, and married train guard James Matthews a matter of weeks later. After serving a short sentence for bigamy, she met Ashley Baker in Oldham in 2007, while she was working in a massage parlour, and they married only a few months later. In 2011 she was engaged to an IT worker, but instead travelled to the United States to marry her sixth husband, policeman Fred Miller, whom she had met online. Her seventh marriage was to Craig Hadwin, whom she met online and tricked into a marriage ceremony in Scotland.

At the time of her sentencing in 2009, Horne had married five times without dissolving her first and only legal marriage. Horne never informed any of her new partners that she was already married. Horne's story was shown on episode "The Bigamist Bride: My Five Husbands" of the Channel 4 documentary series Cutting Edge.

== Cautions and verdicts ==
In August 2004, Horne was cautioned by the police for two cases of bigamy. Her first sentence for bigamy was handed down by Ipswich Crown Court around 2004, when she was sentenced to six months in prison. In June 2009, she was charged again, this time at Minshull Street Crown Court in Manchester. The court passed sentence on 27 July 2009; she was given a ten-month jail sentence, suspended for two years, since the court learned that she was diagnosed with bipolar disorder and was under medication.

In 2011, Horne was arrested and tried for trying to obtain prescription drugs by posing as her seventh husband. Found guilty, she was due to be sentenced on 20 January 2012, but the verdict was postponed pending psychiatric evaluation. On 20 March 2012, she was handed a 12-month community order with supervision. The judge also imposed a 28-day electronically tagged curfew from 7 p.m. to 7 a.m.
