= Nuts (magazine) =

British lad's mag

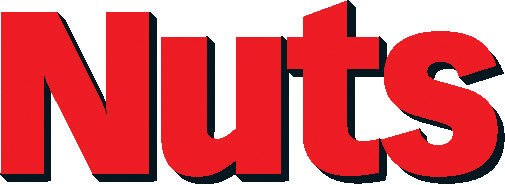

- British glamour model Lucy Pinder on the 2014 cover of the final issue of Nuts
- Editor: Dominic Smith
- Categories: Men's magazines
- Frequency: Weekly
- Circulation: 53,342 (ABC Jul - Dec 2013); Print
- Publisher: IPC Media
- Founded: 2004; 22 years ago
- Final issue: 29 April 2014; 12 years ago
- Company: IPC Media (Inspire), Time Inc.
- Country: United Kingdom
- Language: English
- Website: nuts.co.uk

Nuts was a British lads' mag published weekly in the United Kingdom on Tuesdays from 2004 until 2014. Nuts' marketing campaign at its launch in 2004 used the slogan "When you really need something funny".

== Sector profile ==
Nuts' main rival magazine was Zoo, another weekly, which was aimed at much the same demographic, 18–30-year-old men, and had similar content. Nuts always outsold Zoo, with the sales figures for the later half of 2013 showing a gap of nearly 25,000 copies per week. Other magazines in competition with Nuts included Zip and men's monthly publications such as FHM and Loaded.

== Decline and closure ==
The circulation of the magazine declined from 2007 onwards. The average number of copies sold in the second half of 2013 was 53,342, whereas the magazine had sales of 306,802 at its peak in 2005.

On 8 August 2013, editor Dominic Smith announced their publication would no longer be sold by Co-op supermarkets. Smith withdrew the publication in response to the Co-op's request for publishers to put their 'lads' mags' in modesty bags to mask their explicit front covers. The Co-op said that it was responding to consumer concern.

In March 2014, IPC Media announced that Nuts might soon cease publication after a 30-day consultation with staff. Digital monthly sales of 8,776 (Jul-Dec 2013) suggested to industry observers that the magazine was not making a successful transition to an online platform.

The magazine's last issue was published on 29 April 2014. Lucy Pinder, who was a regular model for Nuts, appeared on the cover of the last issue. The Independent journalist Ella Alexander wrote at the time: "The magazine stayed true to its ethos right until the bitter end – passive, unthreatening, with (objectified versions of) women for everyone."

== Models ==
Some of the models who have appeared in shoots with the magazine include Holly Peers and Lucy Pinder

== See also ==
- Lad culture
- Hot Shots Calendar
- Striker (comic)
