= Zoo Weekly =

UK magazine

- Cover of the 3–9 April 2015 issue, featuring Kate Upton
- Editor: Damien McSorley
- Categories: Men's magazines
- Frequency: Weekly
- Circulation: 29,976 (ABC Jan – Jun 2014); Print and digital editions.
- First issue: 2004 (UK); 2006 (Australia, South Africa)
- Final issue: 2008 (South Africa); 2015 (Australia); 2015 (UK)
- Company: Bauer Media Group
- Country: United Kingdom; Australia; South Africa
- Language: English; Afrikaans

Zoo was a British softcore lad magazine published weekly by Bauer Media Group with periods of an Australian and South African editions. It was launched on 29 January 2004, and for a time was the UK's only men's weekly after the similar and rival magazine Nuts closed in April 2014.

On 17 November 2015, Zoo announced on its website that it would be suspending publication.

Zoo consisted of a mix of comedy news, sports commentary, photos of glamour models, jokes (of the pub joke style), an entertainments guide (covering TV, cinema, video/computer games and music), fashion/grooming and comical/rude pictures sent in by readers.

== UK edition ==
Zoo was a weekly news magazine aimed at the male market. It was launched on 29 January 2004, as the second weekly men's magazine in the UK (the first being the similar and rival magazine; Nuts). The magazine was published by German company Bauer Media Group.

The Zoo website was a continuation of the magazine's content that also included original articles, videos and photo galleries. Readers were also invited to create a profile and post pictures via the "Zoo Bloggers" section.

=== Withdrawal from Co-op supermarket ===
On 8 August 2013, a spokesman for Bauer Media announced that it would not be placing Zoo in 'modesty bags'. The announcement came after the UK's Co-op supermarkets asked for publishers of 'lads mags' to mask their explicit front covers or face being taken off the shelves. The Co-op said that it was responding to consumer concern. As a result of Bauer Media's decision, the Co-op ceased to stock Zoo in its stores.

=== Suspension of publication ===
On 17 November 2015, Zoo announced that it would be suspending publication alongside that of fellow men's magazine FHM.

== International editions ==
=== Australia ===
An Australian edition of Zoo was introduced on 20 February 2006, with a special promotional issue that was free of charge. The first official issue came out a week later on 27 February. It featured Krystal Forscutt and former cricketer David Boon as columnists, as well as many of the same features as its British counterpart, except the sport commentary was mainly about rugby league and Australian rules football.

Spokesperson/models used regularly in Zoo Weekly included Brooke Evers and former Big Brother Australia contestants Krystal Forscutt, Emma Cornell and Susannah Murray. Resident sex and relationship advice columnists for 2009–2010 were "The Threesome" of Monica Lee Paige, Bonnie Edwards and Ardina Voogt. From 2012, the sex and relationship advice column was presented by regular cover model, Ashlee Adams. As well as standard inclusions such as a jokes section and a crossword, each issue included a list of ‘Comedy Hints’; a satirical and comedic set of what are now generally referred to as ‘life hacks’. These were presented as though they had been contributed by readers, whereas in fact almost all of them were generated by one of the credited content writers, Owen Proudfoot.

In May 2006, Australian model Lara Bingle took legal action against EMAP Australia, the publisher of Zoo Weekly, claiming defamation by the magazine when it allegedly published photographs of the model without her permission in the 27 March 2006 issue.

On 16 September 2007, it was reported that professional golfer Nikki Garrett had instructed her lawyers to begin an action against Zoo Weekly in the Australian Federal Court. The matter related to the 29 January 2007 edition of Zoo Weekly in which a photo of Garrett — taken for a charity fund-raiser — was reproduced in the magazine accompanied by an allegedly-salacious caption.

On 17 September 2015, Bauer Media issued a press release confirming the closure of the Australian weekly edition with effect from Monday 12 October 2015. The closure of Zoo Weekly magazine encompassed all platforms: print, website and social media assets.

=== South Africa ===
Following the successes of Zoo Weekly in the United Kingdom and Australia, the South African edition launched on 6 October 2006 under a joint venture between UK publisher EMAP Consumer Media and South African media giant Media24. The magazine was published in both English, as Zoo Weekly, and Afrikaans, as Zoo Weekliks. The edition was discontinued by February 2008.

== See also ==
- Zip
- Ralph
- Lad culture
- Playboy
