= Lad culture =

British and Irish subculture

Lad culture (also the new lad, laddism) was a media-driven, principally British and Irish subculture of the 1990s and the early 2000s. The term lad culture continues to be used today to refer to collective, boorish or misogynistic behaviour by young heterosexual men, particularly university students.

In the lad culture of the 1990s and 2000s, the image of the "lad"—or "new lad"—was that of a generally middle class figure espousing attitudes typically attributed to the working classes. The subculture involved heterosexual young men assuming an anti-intellectual position, shunning cultural pursuits and sensitivity in favour of drinking, sport, sex and sexism. Lad culture was diverse and popular, involving literature, magazines, film, music and television, with ironic humour being a defining trope. Principally understood at the time as a male backlash against feminism and the pro-feminist "new man", the discourse around the new lad represented some of the earliest mass public discussion of how heterosexual masculinity is constructed.

Lad culture as a mainstream cultural phenomenon peaked around the turn of the millennium and can be seen as going into decline as the market for lad mags collapsed in the early 2000s, driven by the rise of the Internet. Nonetheless, the stereotype of the lad continued to be exploited in advertising and marketing as late as the mid-2010s.

Though the term "lad culture" was predominantly used in Britain and Ireland, it was part of a global cultural trend in the developed English speaking world. The title of a 2007 book by the gender studies academic David Nylund about USA Sports Radio, "Beer, Babes and Balls" mirrors the three stereotypical interests of the "lad".

The American term bro culture is closely related, though it originated around two decades later than the term lad culture and therefore should be understood against a different cultural context.

== In popular culture ==
Lad culture did not emerge organically as with earlier British male sub-cultures such as the mods of the 1960s; rather it was a media creation. The term "new lad" was first coined - as a response to then popular concept of the new man - by journalist Sean O'Hagan in a 1993 article in the magazine Arena. The concept was developed and sustained across a diverse range of media: there was a literary component - lad lit; it was closely associated with the musical style Britpop and with certain television shows and stand-up comedians; a number of glossy, violent films in the later 1990s were also popularly linked to lad culture. Most important in shaping and popularising lad culture, though, was the lad mag, a new style of lifestyle magazine for young, heterosexual men that became suddenly popular in the mid-1990s.

=== Lad mags ===
Lad mags included FHM, Front, Loaded, Maxim, Nuts, People, Ralph and Zoo Weekly.

=== Television ===
Men Behaving Badly, Game On and They Think It's All Over were 1990s television programmes that presented images of laddishness dominated by the male pastimes of drinking, watching football, and sex.

=== Film ===
Lad culture grew beyond men's magazines to films such as Snatch and Lock, Stock and Two Smoking Barrels.

== Irony ==
Lad culture was strongly associated with an ironic position. The strapline of the leading lad mag Loaded was "for men who should know better". The BBC in a 1999 review called "Our Decade: New Lad Rules the World" identified that one of the key concepts associated with lad culture (alongside curry and foreign stag weekends) was "anything being acceptable if its "ironic"." Humour in lad mags and in television comedy was a major element of lad culture: the ironic position allowed comedians to both identify themselves as opposed to and, at the same time, indulge in racist, sexist and homophobic jokes.

Part of the ironic position can be seen in relation to the term lad itself. Despite the ubiquity of lad culture in the media of the 1990s there was no expectation that real, individual men would seriously identify themselves as lads: to do so would be to invite ridicule. This was a form of distinctively British class play: middle class — or aspiring middle class — men were playing at being working class. A 2012 National Union of Students report citing the academic John Benyon identified how "Uncensored displays of masculinity during the 1990s were deemed by those involved to be ironic by their very nature. He [Benyon] highlights how the magazine Loaded consciously reduced working class masculinities to jokes, interest in cars and the objectification of women, and dismissed criticisms as humourless attacks on free speech which failed to see the ironic nature of the representations."

Oddly, the lad was both ironic and authentic. Irony was the lad's defining behaviours but the lad himself was often presented as the authentic form of masculinity. For example, GQ in a press-release from 1991 wrote, "GQ is proud to announce that the New Man has officially been laid to rest (if indeed he ever drew breath). The Nineties man knows who he is, what he wants and where he's going, and he's not afraid to say so. And yes, he still wants to get laid."

== In gender studies ==
Though always principally driven by the media, the concept of the "lad" or "new lad" was widely discussed at the time as a male backlash to feminism and changing gender norms. For example, the writer Fay Weldon claimed in 1999 that, "laddishness is a response to humiliation and indignity ... the girl-power! girl-power! female triumphalism which echoes through the land".

The press frequently presented the new lad in opposition to a slightly earlier media construct, the "new man", who supposedly eschewed traditionally male interests as part of his feminist values, a man who "has subjugated his masculinity in order to fulfill the needs of women" and has a "passive and insipid image". Both the "new lad" and the "new man" were - it was always implicitly assumed - heterosexual and cisgender.

Many feminists were robust in their criticism of lad culture. Naomi Wolf stated: "the stereotypes for men attentive to feminism were two: Eunuch, or Beast", in the New Statesman, Kira Cochrane argued that "it's a dark world that Loaded and the lad culture has bequeathed us". Joanne Knowles of Liverpool John Moores University wrote that the "lad" displays "a pre-feminist and racist attitude to women as both sex objects and creatures from another species".

An article in Frieze magazine proposed a psychoanalytic reading of the new lad phenomenon:

"Laddism ... pretend[s] to be endearingly naughty ... Women, faced with lads, are supposed to raise their eyes to heaven in mock despair, thus becoming matriarchal figures who grant their grudgingly but secretly amused blessing ('boys will be boys!') to the sealed male world of laddism. As a heterosexual construct, in which men become little boys with adult desires, and women become their passive but sexually available mothers, laddism is straight from the darker chapters of a psychoanalyst's hand-book."

— Michael Bracewell, "A Boy's Own Story", Frieze Magazine (1996)

Other writers saw less new about the lad. Nylund, in his 2007 "Beer, Babes and Balls" discussion of parallel developments in American popular culture, identifies "a return to hegemonic masculine values of male homosociality". Other writers observed that social constraints simply meant that "it is easier to be a lad rather than a new man in most workplaces". Meanwhile, the lad could be seen as the ongoing reaction to a far older perceived threat from women to men's freedom, one that predated feminism: the lad image was "a refuge from the constraints and demands of marriage and nuclear family".

== Social studies ==
A study by Gabrielle Ivinson of Cardiff University and Patricia Murphy of the Open University identified lad culture as a source of behavioural confusion, and an investigation by Adrienne Katz linked it to suicide and depression. A study of the architecture profession found that lad culture had a negative impact on women completing their professional education. Commentator Helen Wilkinson believes that lad culture has affected politics and decreased the ability of women to participate.

In 2013, the UK National Union of Students released a study on lad culture in UK universities, authored by Alison Phipps and Isabel Young from Sussex University. This study found laddish behaviours to be widespread in sports and social settings amongst male students. It defined lad culture as a group or 'pack' mentality residing in activities such as sport, heavy alcohol consumption and 'banter' which was often sexist, misogynistic, racist or homophobic. It also warned that some laddish behaviours constituted sexual harassment, and could create the conditions for more extreme forms of sexual violence. The UK's largest student union then warned in a 2015 study that universities were failing to address the issue of lad culture, with almost half (49%) of all universities having no policy against discrimination due to sexuality, or anti-sexual harassment policies.

== Related terms and uses ==
The word "ladette" was coined to describe young women who take part in laddish behaviour. Ladettes are defined by the Concise Oxford Dictionary as: "Young women who behave in a boisterously assertive or crude manner and engage in heavy drinking sessions."

The term "lad" is also used in Australian youth culture to refer to the Eshay subculture which is more similar to the chav or football casual subcultures, rather than the middle class student subculture the term refers to in the United Kingdom. Australian lads wear a distinctive dress code, consisting of running caps and shoes combined with striped polo shirts and sports shorts. They frequently use pig latin phrases in conversation, for example "Ad-lay" to refer to a fellow "Lad". Lad-rap is a growing underground hip hop scene in Australia.

== See also ==
- Association football culture
- Bloke
- Bro (subculture)
- Casual (subculture)
- Gender studies
- Ladette to Lady
- Manosphere
- Masculism
- Rake (character)
- UNILAD
- Toxic masculinity
