= Lad mag =

Magazine genre

Lad mag is an informal term used for lifestyle magazines aimed at younger heterosexual men, focusing on "sex, sport, gadgets and grooming tips", particularly in the UK in the 1990s and early 2000s. The lad mag was notable as a new type of magazine; previously, lifestyle magazines had been almost entirely bought by women. It was the central cultural component of 1990s lad culture. The rapid decline of the lad mag in the late 1990s and early 2000s is generally associated with the rise of the Internet which provided much of the same content for free.

== Emergence of lad mags ==
Through the 1980s, efforts were made to create a market for lifestyle magazines for younger men, without success: magazines such as Cosmo Man and The Hit were short-lived failures. In 1994, linked to the wider development of lad culture, two new magazines found a formula that worked: IPC's Loaded and EMAP Metro's FHM. Both magazines were selling hundreds of thousands of copies shortly after launch/relaunch.

== Status as pornography ==
Reporting on multiple studies of the content of lad mags, academics Coy and Horvath reported in 2011 that the "prominent themes are of female nudity and self-centred pleasure seeking." A 2005 study of the content of the magazine Nuts found each issue typically had over 70 images of women with a third topless. Nonetheless, lad mags were generally accepted as not being pornographic: even Coy and Horvath writing in the journal Feminism and Psychology were careful to state that they recognised "the differences between lad mags and pornography".

Similarly, in UK law, the lad mags were not classified as pornography. This meant that full nudity could not be shown, but photos of women's naked breasts appeared inside the magazines (though not on the cover). This was a critical issue for sales: unlike pornographic magazines, lad mags could be sold to under 18s and did not have to be placed on the top shelf of newsagents, out of the reach of children. Instead, they were typically positioned on the shelves at a central position, in the lifestyle category.

The covers of lad mags typically showed a very scantily dressed woman. A contributing factor to the decline of the magazines was the successful anti-sexism campaigns of the early 2010s. Campaigners persuaded major newsagents that—due to the highly sexualized images of women on the covers—the magazines needed to be sold in opaque bags.

== In gender studies ==
The lad mag was at the time seen as distinct from magazines targeted at the stereotypical new man. Contrasting the two gender constructs, Tim Edwards, a sociologist at the University of Leicester, described the new man as pro-feminist, albeit narcissistic, and the new lad as pre-feminist, and a reaction to second-wave feminism. The new man image failed to appeal to a wide readership whereas the more adolescent lad culture appealed more to the ordinary man, said Edwards. Edwards also pointed out that lad culture men's magazines of the 21st century contained little that was actually new. Referring to a study of the history of Esquire magazine, he observed that there was little substantially different between the new man Arena and GQ and the new lad Loaded. Both addressed the assumed men's interests of cars, alcohol, sport, and women, and differed largely in that the latter had a more visual style. From this he inferred that "the New Man and the New Lad are niches in the market more than anything else, often defined according to an array of lifestyle accessories", and concluded that the new lad image dominated the new man image simply because of its greater success at garnering advertising revenue for men's magazines.

== See also ==
- List of men's magazines
- Lad lit
