= Box Elder =

Box Elder or Boxelder may refer to:

== Flora and fauna ==
- Box elder or Acer negundo, a species of maple
- Boxelder bug, an insect which feeds on maple trees

== Communities ==
- Box Elder, Colorado
- Box Elder, Montana, a census-designated place (CDP) in Chouteau and Hill counties
- Box Elder, South Dakota, a city in Meade and Pennington counties
- Box Elder County, Utah, a county in Utah
- Brigham City, Utah, formerly known as Box Elder
- Box Elder, Nebraska, a community located north of McCook, Nebraska

== Streams ==
- Box Elder Creek (Colorado), a tributary of the South Platte River
- Boxelder Creek (Belle Fourche River), a stream in South Dakota
- Boxelder Creek (Cheyenne River), a stream in South Dakota
- Boxelder Creek (Grand River), a stream in South Dakota

== Media ==
- Box Elders, a punk band from Omaha, Nebraska
- "Box Elder", a song by Pavement, released on the Slay Tracks: 1933–1969 EP (1989)
- Box Elder (film), a 2008 independent movie

== Other ==
- Box Elder Peak (Utah County, Utah), a mountain in Utah, USA
- Box Elder Treaty, 1863 agreement
