= Hopkins High School =

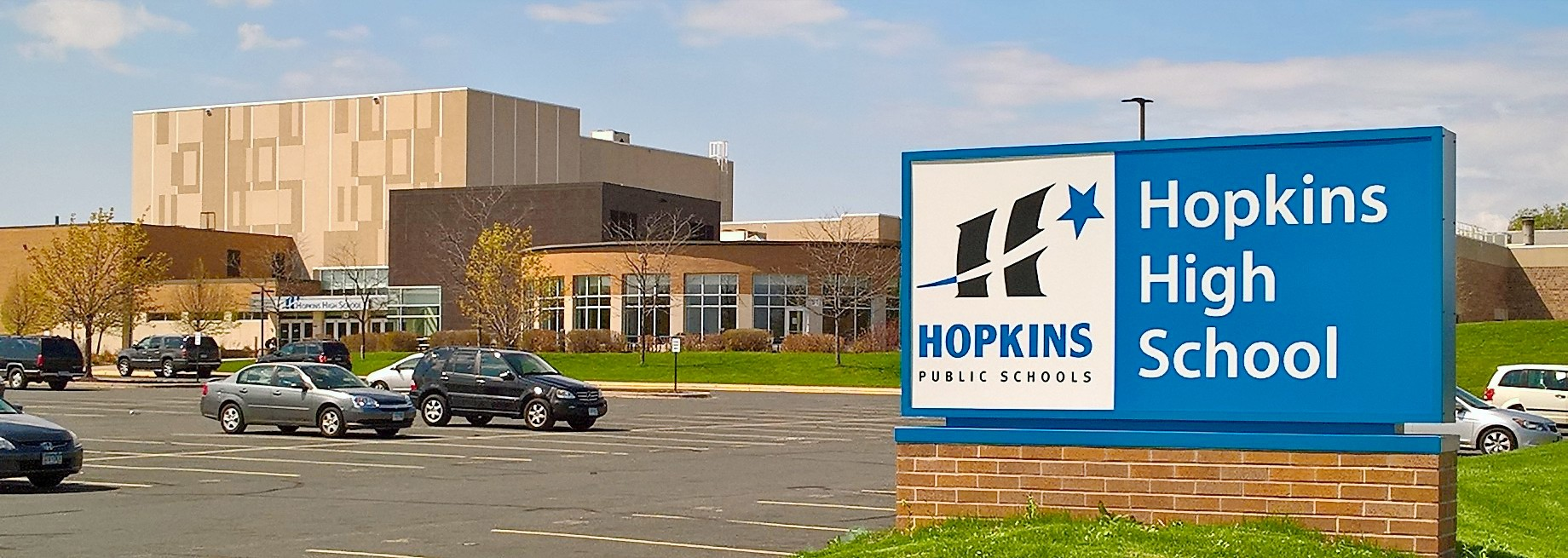

Location
- 2400 Lindbergh Drive; Minnetonka, Minnesota; United States; 44°57′27″N 93°24′46″W

Information
- Type: Public
- Motto: Hopkins: Great to World Class.
- Established: c. 1862
- School district: Hopkins Public Schools
- Principal: Crystal Ballard
- Staff: 100.03 (FTE)
- Enrollment: 1,991 (2023-2024)
- Student to teacher ratio: 19.90
- Campus: Suburban
- Colors: Royal Blue, Silver
- Athletics conference: Lake Conference
- Mascot: Leo (Lion)
- Website: www.hopkinsschools.org

Hopkins High School is a public high school located in Minnetonka, Minnesota, United States. Hopkins High School is part of the Hopkins School District 270.

== History ==
In the 1970s, there were two high schools in the district: Dwight D. Eisenhower Senior High School, named for the former general and U.S. president and Charles A. Lindbergh Senior High School named for the Minnesota native and famed aviator. In 1982, Hopkins closed Eisenhower High School, located in a 1950s-era building along Highway 7, and renamed the remaining school Hopkins Senior High School. The older building was converted to a community center and theater. Later part of the building was converted for use as an elementary school.

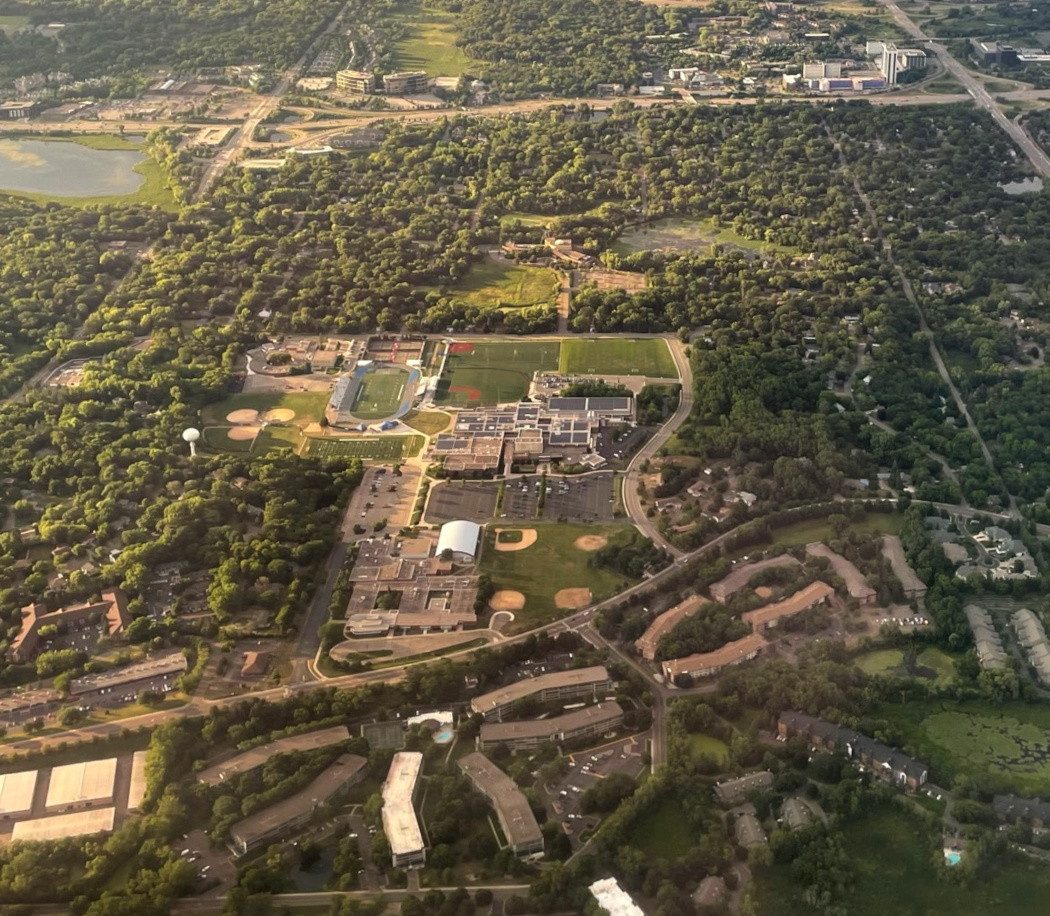
Aerial view of Hopkins High School

== Academics ==
Hopkins High School was Minnesota's first National School of Excellence. In 1996, Hopkins was the only high school in Minnesota honored for overall excellence in Redbook's America's Best High Schools project. The Language Arts Department has been named a "Center for Excellence" by the National Council of Teachers of English in recognition of the writing program. The Community Involvement program is one of six in the nation honored by the IBM Corporation and U.S. News & World Report. U.S. News & World Report also ranked the school #628 in their 2012 list of best public high schools in America.

Hopkins is also home to KHOP-TV which produces both weekly shows and cable programming, a school dance program called the Royelles, a hip-hop dance team named Deeply Royal, as well as a Student Government and school newspaper.

== Athletics ==
Hopkins High School is a member of the Lake Conference of the Minnesota State High School League.

== Notable alumni ==
- Stefon Leron Alexander (P.O.S.) – rapper/musician; member of Doomtree collective and Marijuana Deathsquads
- Alan Bersten - professional ballroom and Latin dancer/choreographer on Dancing with the Stars
- Travis Boyd (born 1993) – NHL player for the Utah Mammoth
- Paige Bueckers (born 2001) – basketball player, UConn Huskies, Dallas Wings, Breeze BC in Unrivaled and multiple USA national youth teams
- Siyani Chambers (born 1993) - basketball player for ADA Blois Basket 41
- Amir Coffey (born 1997) – basketball player in the Israeli Basketball Premier League; formerly in the NBA for the Los Angeles Clippers, and in college for the Minnesota Golden Gophers
- Nia Coffey (born 1995) - basketball player, Northwestern Wildcats, Minnesota Lynx
- Joe Coleman (born 1993) - college basketball player
- Courtney Dauwalter – ultramarathon runner
- Andrew Dawson – Grammy Award-winning music producer and engineer
- Joseph Fahnbulleh – Liberian-American sprinter, attended the 2020 Tokyo Olympics and placed 5th in the men's 200m final.
- Reed Fischer — professional runner
- Anders Folk - former federal prosecutor and candidate for Hennepin County Attorney
- LeRoy Gardner III – national champion wrestler (2001 and 2003)
- Joan Guetschow – Olympic biathlete (1985 graduate)
- Holly Henry – musician and former The Voice contestant
- Kris Humphries (born 1985)– NBA basketball player, Atlanta Hawks, Washington Wizards, New Jersey Nets
- Alexander Johnson – figure skater
- Kathryn Johnson – U.S. rugby player, 2016 Olympics Rugby 7s
- Jo Ling Kent (2002) – news reporter
- Brian Klaas – political scientist and author
- Joe Klecker – professional runner and 2021 Olympian
- Jim Korn – NHL player (1980–1990)
- Garrott Kuzzy – 2010 Olympic cross country skier
- Lazerbeak – rapper/musician and member of Doomtree collective
- Michael Lehan – NFL football player, Cleveland Browns cornerback (2003–2005), Miami Dolphins (2006–2008)
- Liv McGill - basketball player
- Karen McGrane – content strategist and website accessibility advocate
- Mike Mictlan – rapper/musician and member of Doomtree collective
- Zeke Nnaji – NBA basketball player, Arizona Wildcats, Denver Nuggets
- Cecil Otter – rapper/musician and member of Doomtree collective
- Jeffrey Lee Parson – apprehended by FBI for creating MSBlast. B computer virus in 2003
- Ryan Schreiber – founded Pitchfork Media and Pitchfork Music Festival
- Steve Simon - politician
- Sims – rapper/musician and member of Doomtree collective
- Todd Sklar – filmmaker, Box Elder, Awful Nice
- Dave Snuggerud – Captain MN Gophers NCAA runner up 1989. Drafted #1 overall in the 1988 NHL Supplemental Draft. NHL player. Buffalo Sabres, San Jose Sharks, Philadelphia Flyers (1989–1993)
- Nadine Strossen – president of American Civil Liberties Union (1991–2008). Hopkins debater.
- Paper Tiger – rapper/musician and member of Doomtree collective
- Royce White (born 1991) – NBA basketball player (Houston Rockets) and political candidate
