= Todd Sklar =

American film director

- Occupation(s): Film director, screenwriter, actor
- Years active: 2008–present

Todd Sklar is an American film director, screenwriter and actor. His feature directorial debut, Box Elder, gained national attention after being self-distributed around the country. Sklar's most recent film, Awful Nice, premiered in competition at the 2013 SXSW Film Festival and was released theatrically in 2014.

== Career ==
Todd Sklar grew up in Minneapolis, Minnesota. He studied at the University of Missouri, but dropped out to make his first feature film, Box Elder. After getting into no film festivals and being unable to get the film in front of buyers, Sklar took to the road with some of the film's cast, self-distributing it on a four-month cross-country tour that featured pre-screening panels, workshops, and Q&A's, as well as post-screening concerts and after-parties.

Due to the tour's success, Sklar and his crew continued touring for the next several years, building a cult following for the film and launching Range Life Entertainment, a marketing company centered on doing the same thing for other films. Filmmakers that have gone on Range Life tours include, Damien Chazelle, Alex Ross Perry, Donald Glover, Adrian Grenier, Casey Affleck, Banksy, Dan Lindsay & T. J. Martin, Alex Karpovsky, Todd Rohal, J. J. Lask, Bart Layton, Oren Moverman, Brett Simon, Billy Corben, Ari Gold, Bob Byington, and Chris Jaymes.

In 2011, Sklar stepped away from Range Life to return to filmmaking with the short film, 92 Skybox Alonzo Mourning Rookie Card, which premiered at the 2012 Sundance Film Festival. '92 Skybox eventually turned into his second feature, Awful Nice, which starred Christopher Meloni, Laura Ramsey, Henry Zebrowski, and Keeley Hazell, and played in competition at SXSW, AFI Fest, and Rooftop Films in 2013.

Sklar has also written and directed television and commercials, most notably on Legendary Dudas, and the 2018 Heisman House campaign for Nissan.

== Filmography ==
Year	Title	Role	Notes
2008	Box Elder	Writer, director	Also producer
2012	'92 Skybox Alonzo Mourning Rookie Card	Writer, director	Short film
2013	Awful Nice	Writer, director	Also producer
2014	Foodshow	Writer, director	TV film
2014	TakePart Live	Director	1 Episode
2015	Let's Do It	Writer, director	TV film
2016	Legendary Dudas	Director	2 episodes
2016	Viralocity	Director	TV film
2017	On The Fence	Writer, director	TV film
2020	Dick Move	Director	Pre-production
