= A Stranger in Paradise =

2013 film

- Original theatrical poster
- Directed by: Corrado Boccia
- Screenplay by: Corrado Boccia
- Story by: Corrado Boccia; Taryn Hillin; Wes Schuck; Ryan Sturgis
- Produced by: Daemon Hillin; Corrado Boccia
- Starring: Colin Egglesfield; Catalina Sandino Moreno; Stuart Townsend; Byron Mann; Gary Daniels
- Cinematography: Guy Livneh
- Edited by: Mark LaCroix
- Music by: Keith Ruggiero; Chaz Windus
- Distributed by: Cinema Management Group; Freestyle Releasing
- Release date: May 1, 2013
- Running time: 85 minutes
- Country: United States
- Language: English

A Stranger in Paradise is a 2013 action thriller film directed by Corrado Boccia and starring Colin Egglesfield, Catalina Sandino Moreno, Stuart Townsend and Byron Mann.

== Plot ==
As written in the article by Movies News Week, the main character of Josh Pratt (played by Colin Egglesfield) is on the verge of becoming a partner at a multibillion-dollar hedge fund, but then his life is turned upside down when the Securities and Exchange Commission investigates the head of the fund for insider trading. Pratt finds himself forced into a “vacation” he never asked for; he ends up in Bangkok with a price on his head, a morally ambiguous brother who is deeply involved with the Thai mafia, and a propensity for getting shot at.

Unfortunately for Pratt, the only way out is to give up information he does not know he has.

== Cast ==
- Colin Egglesfield as Josh Pratt
- Catalina Sandino Moreno as Jules
- Byron Mann as Lek
- Stuart Townsend as Paul Pratt
- Gary Daniels as Derek, Paul's bodyguard
- Sonia Couling-Vacharasinthu as Chris
- James Wearing Smith (James With) as Zane
- Teerapat Sajakul as Police Captain
- Sompob Benjathikul as Virote
- Jay Acovone as The Interrogator
- Ronnie Reid as Agent Harry
- Varintorn Yaroojjanont as Somchai
- Wittaya Chaiseriwongsawang as Ray
- Lynette Emond as Oh
- Elina Loukas as Elena
- Jan Yousagoon as Mei
- Sakuntara Peakjuturat as Captain's Assistant
- Paul-Dominique Vacharasinthu as Butler

== Production ==
A Stranger in Paradise was entirely filmed in Thailand with the film's official poster featuring a team of credited producers, emanating from Thailand and abroad; local production services were managed by Benetone Films, and the company website states the firm was an executive producer and a line producer for the film. Production companies collaborating on the film include 24/7 Films, Benetone Films, Hillin Entertainment, Tribus P Films (ex Marengo Films); Noalternative Films is cited as a distribution company in an alternative video with additional footage not shown in the official trailer.

=== Floods in Bangkok ===
It is stated that the production was Benetone's first investment into a Hollywood style of film-making and despite expressed nervousness from the producers, the production continued filming during heavy flooding impacting Bangkok, which occurred throughout October and November 2011, and in the same article Marengo Films is also quoted as an executive producer.

== Release ==
The film had its world premiere on February 14, 2014.

== Reception ==
Critical reception for A Stranger in Paradise has been predominantly negative. The Los Angeles Times and The Dissolve both panned the movie; the Los Angeles Times wrote "Besides the pedestrian caricatures of gangsters and strippers, Boccia does not make much of the inherent mystery and alienation of the Thai setting as Nicolas Winding Refn did with "Only God Forgives." Even the twists late in the plot underwhelm."

== Awards ==
A Stranger in Paradise appears to have been recognised with an Honorable Award For Contribution to Thailand's International Film Industry in the Thailand International Film Destination Festival 2019 website.
