= Colin Egglesfield =

American actor

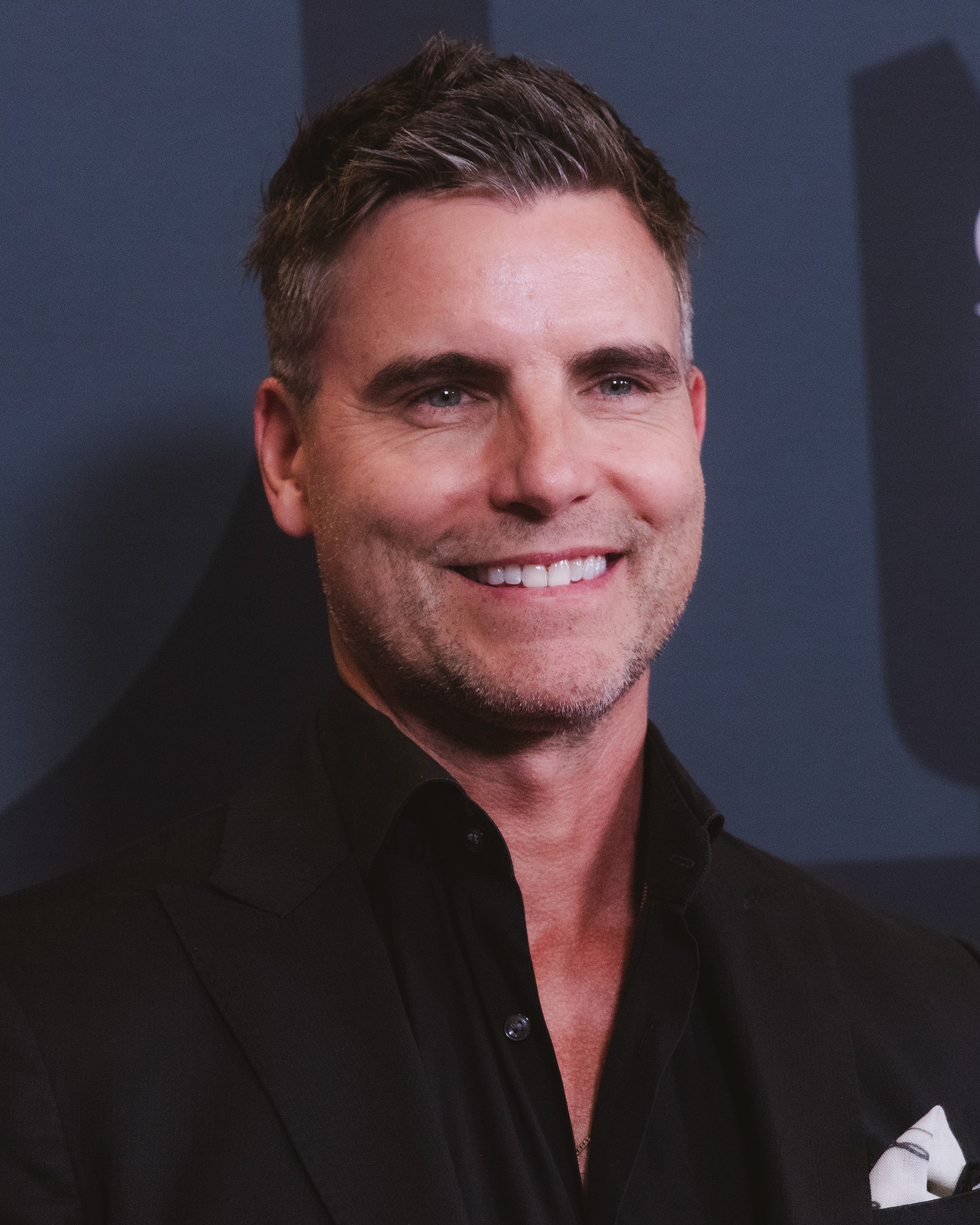
- Egglesfield in 2026
- Born: Farmington Hills, Michigan, U.S.
- Occupation: Actor
- Years active: 2000–present
- Website: colinegglesfield.com

Colin Egglesfield is an American actor. He played Josh Madden in the soap opera All My Children, Auggie Kirkpatrick on The CW's reboot of the drama series Melrose Place, and Dex in the film Something Borrowed.

== Early life ==
Egglesfield was born in Farmington Hills, Michigan, the second child of Kathleen (née Dineen) and William Egglesfield, a physician. His mother is Irish. He has two siblings: an older sister, Kerry, and a younger brother, Sean. He and his siblings were raised as Catholics. After Egglesfield graduated from Marian Catholic High School in Chicago Heights, he attended Illinois Wesleyan University and played for the football team. He transferred to the University of Iowa, where he was in the pre-med program. After he received his BS from Iowa he backpacked throughout Europe.

To earn money for medical school, Egglesfield turned to modeling. He won a contest after entering at the urging of a friend, and left medicine behind for a modeling career. He is signed with Beatrice Model agency in Milan, Italy, and DNA Model Management in New York City. He modeled for Versace, Calvin Klein, and Armani, among others before he started acting. In the late 1990s, he was featured on the covers of Vogue Italia (shot by Steven Meisel) and L'Uomo Vogue (twice, photographed by Bruce Weber and Ellen Von Unwerth respectively).

Egglesfield lived in an apartment near the original World Trade Center and recorded footage of the towers' attack in 2001. He safely went out and avoided the dust that surrounded the Lower Manhattan area.

== Career ==
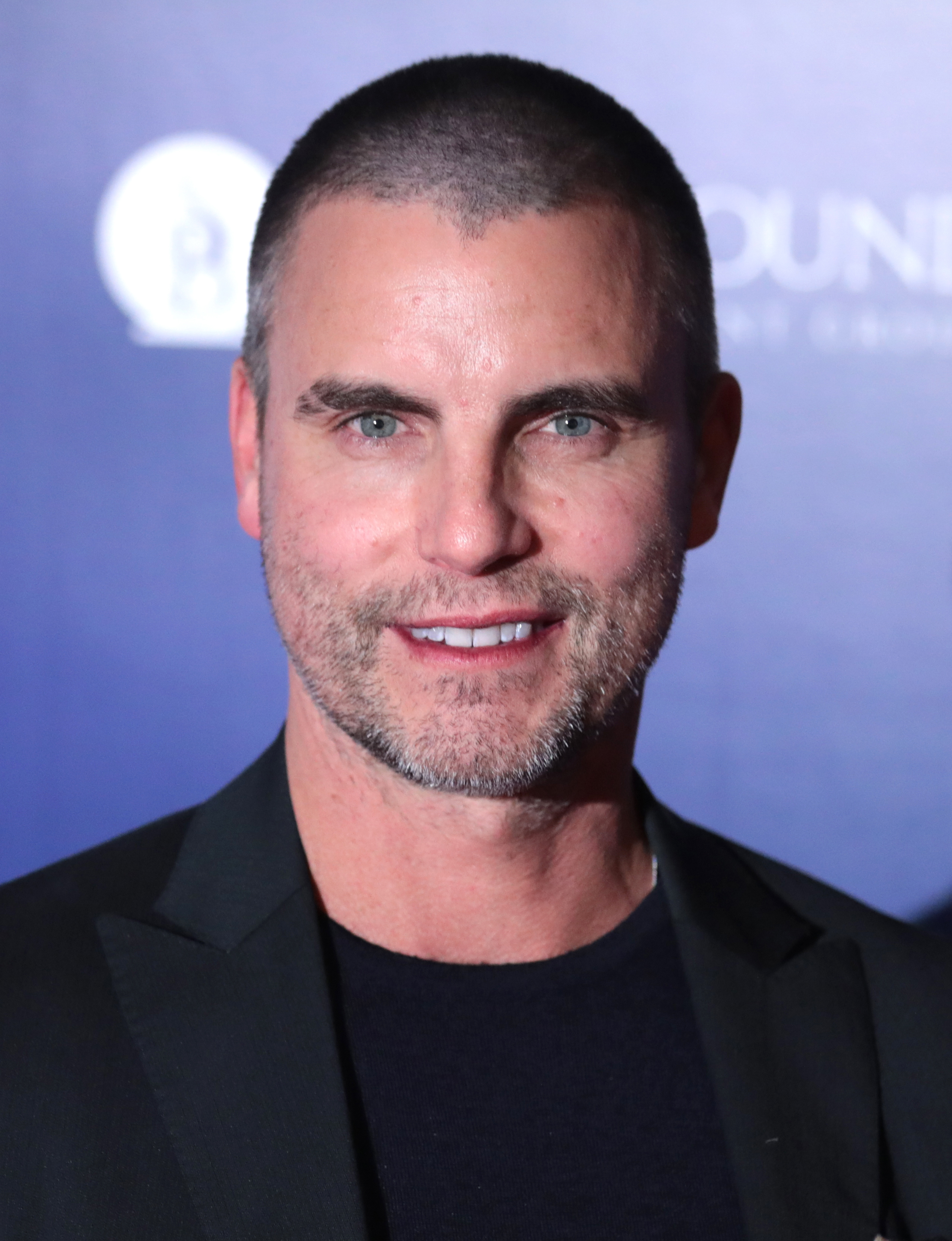
Egglesfield in 2023

After taking drama classes, Egglesfield appeared on several television series including Law & Order: Special Victims Unit, The $treet, Gilmore Girls, Charmed, and Nip/Tuck. He had a small role in the 2005 film Must Love Dogs. In September 2005, he made his debut on All My Children, taking over the role of Josh Madden from his short-lived predecessor Scott Kinworthy. In 2005, Egglesfield was named one of People magazine's "Sexiest Men Alive". In 2006, he starred in the romantic drama film Beautiful Dreamer.

Beginning in the fall of 2009, Egglesfield portrayed chef/surfer guy Auggie Kirkpatrick in The CW's 2009 series Melrose Place. However, due to a change in the direction of the show, Egglesfield and his co-star Ashlee Simpson-Wentz were fired and his character was written out of the show during the thirteenth episode.

In 2011, he starred in the romantic comedy film Something Borrowed opposite Kate Hudson and Ginnifer Goodwin, based on the 2005 book of the same name. From 2011 to 2016, Egglesfield played the recurring role of Tommy Rizzoli on TNT's Rizzoli & Isles. From 2012 to 2013, he starred as Evan Parks on the Lifetime drama series The Client List.

He appeared in the feature films, Life Happens (2011), Open Road (2013), A Stranger in Paradise (2013), Vice with Bruce Willis (2015), Bad Moms (2016), The Space Between Us with Gary Oldman (2017), Reprisal (2018), Backtrace opposite Sylvester Stallone (2018), 100 Days to Live (2019), and in Lifetime's A Rose for Her Grave. He has appeared in numerous television shows including Hawaii Five-O, Chicago Fire, Lucifer and UnReal, and Gilmore Girls.

Egglesfield is also the author of the book Agile Artist: Life Lessons from Hollywood and Beyond in which he shares insight and inspiration from his working in the entertainment industry, having lived through the World Trade Center Events and having overcome two bouts of cancer.

Egglesfield hosts online courses via Patreon that helps people become more confident delivering communication in front of audiences and the camera.

In 2025, Egglesfield launched The Beyond Impact Podcast. He has also participated in speaking engagements related to personal development and communication.

== Filmography ==
Film
| Year | Title | Role | Notes |
|---|---|---|---|
| 2003 | S.W.A.T. | LAPD officer | |
| 2005 | Vampires: The Turning | Connor | |
| 2005 | Must Love Dogs | David | |
| 2006 | Beautiful Dreamer | Joe Kelly / Thomas "Tommy" Warner | |
| 2009 | The Good Guy | Baker | |
| 2010 | The Au Pairs | Jake | Short film |
| 2011 | Something Borrowed | Dexter "Dex" Thaler III | |
| 2005 | Life Happens | Ivan #1 | |
| 2005 | Just a Little Heart Attack | Husband | Short film |
| 2012 | Open Road | David | |
| 2013 | A Stranger in Paradise | Josh | |
| 2015 | Vice | Reiner | |
| 2017 | The Space Between Us | Sarah's brother | |
| 2018 | The Row | Alex Villiers | |
| 2018 | Reprisal | FBI Agent Fields | |
| 2018 | The Middle of X | Mack Prescott | |
| 2018 | Backtrace | Detective Carter | |
| 2019 | 100 Days to Live | Gabriel Weeks | |
| 2020 | Love By Drowning | Val Martin | |
| 2024 | The Time Travel Hills | Jacob Clark | |
| 2024 | Duchess | Tom Sullivan | |

Television
| Year | Title | Role | Notes |
|---|---|---|---|
| 2000 | The $treet | Artist | Episode: "The Ultimatum" |
| 2001 | Law & Order: Special Victims Unit | Steven | Episode: "Folly" |
| 2004 | Gilmore Girls | Sean | Episode: "Girls in Bikinis, Boys Doin' The Twist" |
| 2004 | Nip/Tuck | Mr. Rourke | Episode: "Sean McNamara" |
| 2004 | 12 Days of Terror | Alex | Television film |
| 2005 | Charmed | Tim Cross | Episode: "Death Becomes Them" |
| 2005–2009 | All My Children | Josh Madden | Recurring role |
| 2009–2010 | Melrose Place | Auggie Kirkpatrick | Main role |
| 2010 | Brothers & Sisters | Young William Walker | Episode: "Time After Time: Part 1" |
| 2010 | Hawaii Five-0 | Jordan Townsend | Episode: "Heihei" |
| 2011 | Carnal Innocence | Tucker Longstreet | Television film |
| 2011–2016 | Rizzoli & Isles | Thomas "Tommy" Rizzoli | Recurring role |
| 2012–2013 | The Client List | Evan Parks | Main role |
| 2014 | Unforgettable | Agent Charles Sewell | Episode: "A Moveable Feast" |
| 2014 | Drop Dead Diva | Charlie French | Episode: "Truth & Consequences" |
| 2015 | Chasing Life | Dr Barratt | Episode: "Wild Thing" |
| 2015 | Murder in Mexico: The Bruce Beresford-Redman Story | Bruce | Television film |
| 2015 | Autumn Dreams | Ben Lawson | Television film |
| 2016, 2018 | Lucifer | Bradley Wheeler | Episodes: "Liar, Liar, Slutty Dress on Fire" and "Quintessential Deckerstar" |
| 2018 | Chicago Fire | Gordon Mayfield | Episode: "Always A Catch" |
| 2021 | A Christmas Witness | Dean Cupo | Television film |
| 2023 | A Rose for Her Grave: The Randy Roth Story | Randy Roth | Television film |
| 2024 | A Holiday Hideout | Dean Cupo | Television Movie |
