= A Rose for Her Grave and Other True Cases =

1993 book written by Ann Rule

- Author: Ann Rule
- Genre: True crime, Non-fiction
- Published: 1993
- Publisher: Pocket Books
- Pages: 528
- Awards: Anthony Award for Best True Crime (1994)
- ISBN: 978-0-671-79353-1
- Website: A Rose for Her Grave

A Rose for Her Grave and Other True Cases is the first book in author Ann Rule's Crime Files Series. Released in 1993 by Pocket Books, the book details Randy Roth, who murdered two of his wives for insurance money, as well as other cases, including those of Dick Marquette, a convicted Oregon serial killer.

== Critical reception ==
Publishers Weekly, in its August 1993 review, wrote that "Rule discusses the effect of the individual case on her feelings about capital punishment and other issues, and her unwavering voice presents even the most gruesome details rationally."

The Library Journal's Ben Harrison wrote in 1993 that Rule's accounts of the crimes "present the female victims as real people who deserve compassionate treatment."

== Awards ==
In 1994, the book won Bouchercon's Anthony Award for Best True Crime.

== Film adaptation ==
In 2023, Lifetime released a television movie loosely based on the book, starring Colin Egglesfield, Laura Ramsey, and Chrishell Stause.
