= Open Road (2012 film) =

2012 film directed by Márcio Garcia

- Theatrical release poster
- Directed by: Marcio Garcia
- Written by: Julia Camara
- Starring: Camilla Belle; Colin Egglesfield; Andy Garcia; Juliette Lewis; John Savage; Michael King
- Cinematography: Jonathan Hall
- Edited by: Daniel M. Turcan; Felipe Velloso
- Music by: Ruben Feffer
- Production companies: BB Film Productions; Society Entertainment; Marcio Garcia Producoes
- Distributed by: Universal Pictures (USA); H2O Films (Brazil)
- Release dates: July 15, 2012 (Los Angeles Brazilian Film Festival); February 22, 2013 (Brazil)
- Running time: 85 minutes
- Countries: Brazil; United States
- Languages: Portuguese; English
- Budget: $3 million
- Box office: $47,469

Open Road is a 2012 American-Brazilian thriller drama film directed by Marcio Garcia. The film follows the story of Angie, a young Brazilian artist who travels to the United States in a journey of self-discovery. Arriving in the United States, she rents a car and starts running through the streets, and meets Chuck, a street dweller.

== Production ==
The movie is a co-production between Brazil and the U.S. Camilla Belle, whose mother is Brazilian and father is American, didn't have any trouble preparing for her role of Angie. Her character also has parents from both countries, just like in her real life. Belle feels that is important for her to promote the Brazilian culture overseas.

== Cast ==
Actor/Actress	Role
Camilla Belle	Angie
Juliette Lewis	Jill
Colin Egglesfield	David
Andy Garcia	Chuck
John Savage	Carl
Ingrid Rogers	Georgia
Craig Gellis	Ronny
Kristi Clainos	Louise
Emily Nelson	Waitress
Michael Cardelle	Nick
Christiane Torloni	Gloria
Jennifer Cambra	Jennifer
Alex Sander	Cop
Carol Castro	Sonia
Anya Andrews	Olivia
Michael King	Director of Highway Police
