= The Days (American TV series) =

- episode five intertitle
- Genre: Drama
- Created by: John Scott Shepherd
- Starring: David Newsom; Marguerite MacIntyre; Evan Peters; Laura Ramsey; Zachary Maurer
- Composer: Jeff Martin
- Country of origin: United States
- Original language: English
- No. of seasons: 1
- No. of episodes: 6

Production
- Running time: 60 minutes
- Production companies: Tollin-Robbins Productions; Mindshare Entertainment

Original release
- Network: ABC
- Release: July 18 – August 22, 2004

The Days is an American drama series that aired on ABC from July 18 until August 22, 2004. Each episode chronicles 24 hours in the lives of the members of the fictional Day family.

The series was produced for ABC by MindShare Worldwide, a GroupM media agency within WPP Group that financed the series in exchange for ABC advertising time.

== Plot ==
The plot revolves around a Philadelphia family, the Days. The father, Jack Day (David Newsom) is a corporate lawyer who quits his job at a pharmaceutical company in the midst of a mid-life crisis. His wife, Abby Day (Marguerite MacIntyre) has recently re-entered the work force as an executive for an advertising firm after taking time off to raise their children. The couple's eldest child, daughter Natalie Day (Laura Ramsey), is homecoming queen, a soccer star, and the most popular girl in school, until she finds out she's pregnant. Cooper Day (Evan Peters) is the middle child and an aspiring writer who counts the days until his graduation. He begins and ends each episode with a monologue of an entry in his journal. Nathan Day (Zachary Maurer) is the youngest child, a child prodigy, who attends a private school and frequently suffers panic attacks.

== Cast ==
- David Newsom as Jack Day
- Marguerite MacIntyre as Abby Day
- Evan Peters as Cooper Day
- Laura Ramsey as Natalie Day
- Zachary Maurer as Nathan Day

== Episodes ==
No.	Title	Directed by	Written by	Original release date
1	"Day 1,412"	Chris Long	John Scott Shepherd	July 18, 2004
Abby and her daughter Natalie find out that they're both pregnant on the same day. Jack quits his job. Nathan suffers a panic attack during a test, and eventually gets his first girlfriend.
2	"Day 1,403"	Chris Long	John Scott Shepherd	July 25, 2004
Jack is undecided as to what he wants to do with the rest of his life. Abby finds out that her ex-flame was hired to work closely with her. Natalie struggles with her pregnancy and the stigma of being the 'pregnant girl' at school. Cooper wins a national writing contest and, with it, the affections of Natalie's former best friend Emma.
3	"Day 1,385"	Robert Duncan McNeill	John Scott Shepherd	August 1, 2004
Jack is seeing a psychologist to get his old job back. Cooper is left with a decision that will either compromise his integrity or get him the girl.
4	"Day 1,375"	David Carson	John Scott Shepherd	August 8, 2004
Jack plans a family day, which is opposed by the rest of the family. They go to see Nathan's first soccer game. Later, Cooper (things having fallen apart with Emma) makes a move on Zanni, his friend.
5	"Day 1,370: Part 1"	Robert Duncan McNeill	John Scott Shepherd & Layne Wong	August 15, 2004
Natalie and Jack are fighting to get Natalie the right to play soccer. Cooper goes to Zanni's house to lose his virginity. Jack plans a 40th birthday party for Abby. Abby ends up in early labour causing her to crash the car. To be continued...
6	"Day 1,370: Part 2"	John Scott Shepherd	John Scott Shepherd	August 22, 2004
Natalie goes to a free clinic considering an abortion but change her mind after she learns that her mother lost the baby. Abby has a miscarriage, and the family is at the hospital waiting for Abby's recovery from her car crash.
