= Beautiful Dreamer (2006 film) =

- Film poster
- Directed by: Terri Farley Teruel
- Story by: Terry Chase Chenowith (screenplay and story)
- Produced by: Terry Chase Chenowith
- Starring: Brooke Langton; Colin Egglesfield; James Denton
- Cinematography: David Bridges
- Edited by: Charles Ireland
- Music by: Ramón Balcázar
- Production companies: Wild Horse Productions (co-production); Back Fence Productions (co-production)
- Distributed by: Lantern Lane Entertainment
- Release date: September 13, 2006 (Temecula Valley)
- Running time: 90 minutes
- Country: United States
- Language: English

Beautiful Dreamer is a 2006 romantic drama film directed by Terri Farley Teruel. The film stars Brooke Langton and Colin Egglesfield as childhood sweethearts who become husband and wife as America enters World War II. Beautiful Dreamer is loosely based on real-life events that occurred on a Consolidated B-24 Liberator bombing mission during World War II and the aftermath of the war as it affected a small family.

== Plot ==
Soon after childhood sweethearts Joe Kelly (Colin Egglesfield) and Claire (Brooke Langton) get married, Joe, a former cropduster, becomes a Consolidated B-24 Liberator bomber pilot in United States Army Air Force. During a mission over Germany, he crashes his bomber and is captured. After suffering a head wound, he is given a fallen comrade's dog tags and assumes that identity. As a result, he is presumed dead.

After the war, Claire and Joe's grandfather, William Kelly (Barry Corbin), struggle to make a new life at "Kelly's Field", a small aerial maintenance operation in Boone City, California. (Note: The fictional Boone City in also in The Best Years of Our Lives (1946) and is patterned after Cincinnati, Ohio.) At lunch with one of Joe's crew members and his wife, Claire finds out that Joe did not die in the crash. A year after, he was seen in the back of a truck, surrounded by German guards.

Claire pledges to find Joe, and after going through army records, as well as visiting veterans hospitals, she is not dissuaded. When she is directed to Martin-Warner Aviation in Harris, California, to meet with William Martin (William Lee Scott), the trail runs cold until her car breaks down in the town and she spots Joe at Ruby's, the local cafe.

Claire is shocked that he does not recognize her and is known as "Tommy" (Thomas Warner). Tommy is conflicted, trying to understand who this woman is to him. Grandpa Kelly, on advice from Dr. Kessler (James Denton), counsels her to not try to tell Tommy the truth, as an amnesiac would not survive any more psychotic events. As a partner of William Martin, Tommy repairs aircraft, and serves as their chief pilot. Claire takes a job as a waitress at Ruby's. William flirts with her, but she ignores him, although accepting his invitation to visit the shop. Claire encounters Rachael Thompson (Lauren Woodland) whom she sees is in love with Tommy.

After a falling out with William, Tommy is afraid that a botched contract to ship goods could mean the end of their business. Claire offers to help, setting up a deal with Grandpa Kelly to obtain parts to convert a derelict B-24 bomber into a cargo aircraft to satisfy the contract. Tommy's memory is starting to come back, but Claire is worried that Rachael is vying to marry him.

At dance night at Ruby's, William and Rachael dance together, while Tommy dances with Claire, but flashbacks of an earlier life begin to occur. When he is in the old B-24, he begins to remember the crash where he was severely injured, but managed to pull a crewmate out of the wreckage. When Claire tries to help, he pushes her away. Heartbroken, she takes her wedding ring off, trading it for money to return home.

At the shop, Tommy and William have a successful test flight with the restored B-24 bomber, with Claire and many townspeople watching the flight. She leaves soon after. In the air, Tommy relives the shock of the wartime crash and collapses, unconscious. William brings the aircraft in to a safe landing and rushes Tommy to the hospital.

Tommy recovers, and realizes he is Joe Kelly and has a previous life. At home, when Claire is out for a walk to the pond where Joe had proposed to her, she sees a B-24 bomber fly over and runs after it, hoping Joe has returned. Reaching the aircraft, Clair and Joe reunite, with him giving her back her wedding ring.

== Cast ==
- Brooke Langton as Claire Kelly
- Colin Egglesfield as Joe Kelly/Tomas "Tommy" Weaver
- James Denton as Dr. Kessler
- Barry Corbin as William Kelly, "Grandpa"
- Rusty Schwimmer as Jeannie
- William Lee Scott as William Martin
- Lauren Woodland as Rachael Thompson
- Elise Jackson as Sherry
- Susan Barnes as Ruby
- Tom Everett as Colonel Baynes
- Elise Jackson as Sherry
- Channon Roe as Ray (credited as Shannon Roe)
- Brett Moses as Pete Newell
- Tim Ryan as Douglas
- Duke Stroud as Colonel Chambers

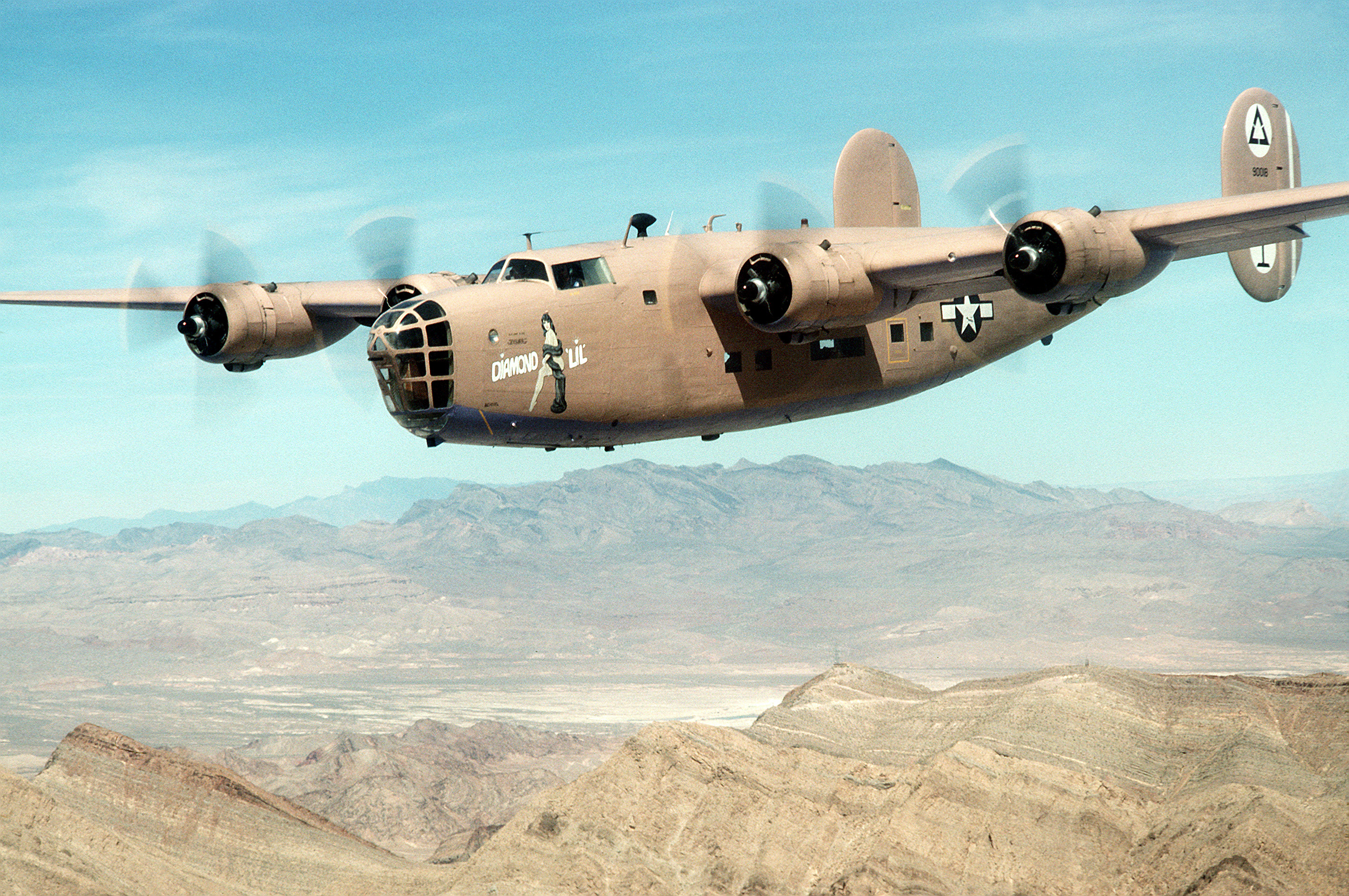
LB-30A Diamond Lil from the Commemorative Air Force collection

== Production ==
Beautiful Dreamer is loosely based on the lives of the crew of the Consolidated B-24 Liberator Starduster. Captain Willis Miller was a B-24 pilot in World War II who was a member of the 392 Bomb Group, 577th/579th Squadron, 2nd Division, of the 8th Air Force. The Starduster crew flew over 30 missions over Europe, suffering no casualties throughout the war despite risking their lives every day. While flying a mission in their B-24 over Eastern Europe, Miller and crew was involved in a fire fight which damaged the aircraft. Miller crash-landed the bomber with no fatalities.

Willis and his wife, Dorothy Miller, were the major funders of the film. Their daughter Dottie Miller-Sublett and her husband Brad Sublett, created "Dott's Starduster" as a production company to not only fund the production, but also to act as executive producers. Appearing before the end credits is the statement: "Beautiful Dreamer is dedicated to Willis and Dorothy Miller and the brave men of the B-24 Liberator 'Starduster'." Following was a list of the crew, their individual combat records and list of support staff that maintained the aircraft.

Principal photography took place over a 17-day period in Los Angeles, Sable Ranch, Disney Ranch, Camarillo and Whiteman Airports, California. The aircraft in the film included actual B-24 Liberator bombers, as well as computer-generated imagery. (Note: Consolidated B-24A/LB-39A Liberator Diamond Lil (0-2366, formerly Ol' 927) from the Commemorative Air Force (B-24/B-29 Squadron) in Addison, Texas was flown in the film.) The other aircraft that were seen include the Boeing-Stearman Kaydet trainer and crop duster and Beechcraft Model 18 light transport and training aircraft.

== Reception ==
In his review for Reel Film Reviews, David Nusair wrote, "Beautiful Dreamer, anchored by an undercurrent of palpable romance, establishes itself as an old-fashioned melodrama that's ultimately impossible to resist."

Madelyn Ritrosky for Entertainment Magazine noted:

Beautiful Dreamer is a film that harkens back to classic Hollywood romances like 'An Affair to Remember', 'It's a Wonderful Life', and 'The Best Years of Our Lives'. And it is nostalgically romantic as well, setting the love story in the "romantic" past of the World War II era – which also conjures associations with 'the golden age' of 1940s Hollywood. Not many contemporary films do this. Thus, Beautiful Dreamer seems perfect for moviegoers who feel ignored by blockbuster-Hollywood's obsessive quest for 13- to 25-year-old males as well as the postmodern cynicism or moral ambiguity of edgy independents. When I saw this film at the Santa Barbara International Film Festival, I loved it. Some viewers next to me – retired folk, no doubt – had only good things to say about the film as the lights came up. This is the older audience segment that the filmmakers consider part of their target audience: older viewers with a closer connection to the 1940s, and with firsthand experience watching classic Hollywood movies.

== Awards ==
Beautiful Dreamer was entered in a number of film festivals, winning significant awards. In the 2006 Central Florida Film Festival, the film won Best Feature, Best Feature Film and Audience Favorite Award. At the George Lindsey 2007 UNA Film Festival, Beautiful Dreamer won the Gold Lion for Best Professional Full-Length Narrative. At the 2006 Temecula Valley International Film Festival, the film won the Jury Award for Best Feature Film.
