= St George's Day (film) =

2012 British gangster film by Frank Harper

- Original theatrical poster
- Directed by: Frank Harper
- Written by: Urs Buehler; Frank Harper
- Produced by: Nick Hamson; Warren Derosa
- Starring: Frank Harper; Craig Fairbrass; Charles Dance; Vincent Regan; Dexter Fletcher; Nick Moran; Keeley Hazell
- Cinematography: Mike Southon, BSC
- Edited by: Nick McCahearty
- Music by: Tim Atack
- Distributed by: Metrodome
- Release date: 7 September 2012
- Running time: 109 Minutes
- Country: United Kingdom
- Language: English

St George's Day is a 2012 British gangster film. It is directed by Frank Harper and stars Harper, Craig Fairbrass, Charles Dance, Vincent Regan, Dexter Fletcher, Nick Moran and Keeley Hazell.

== Plot ==
Cousins Micky Mannock (Frank Harper) and Ray Collishaw (Craig Fairbrass) run London's top firm. But their supremacy in the capital's gangster underworld is threatened when they lose a drug shipment belonging to the Russian Mafia. They plan a heist in Berlin which, if successful, could pay off their debts and set them up for life. Hiding out among an English super-firm gearing up for a massive showdown as the 3 Lions play Germany on St. George's Day, their gang have just one shot at the job. But with the police and Russians on their trail, the last thing they need is a informant in the ranks.

== Cast ==
- Craig Fairbrass as Ray Collishaw
- Frank Harper as Micky Mannock
- Charles Dance as Trenchard
- Vincent Regan as Albert Ball
- Dexter Fletcher as Levi
- Nick Moran as Richard
- Keeley Hazell as Peckham Princess
- Jamie Foreman as Nixon
- Sean Pertwee as Proctor
- Luke Treadaway as William Bishop
- Ashley Walters as Kootz
- Tony Denham as Eddie Mannock
- Neil Maskell as Jimmy McCudden
- Zlatko Burić as Vladimir Sukhov
- Clemency Burton-Hill as Amelia
- Charles Venn as Lol
- Mark-John Ford as Louis
- Velibor Topić as Albanian Thug
- Angela Gots as Ellie Collishaw
- Susan Fordham as Undercover Police
- Ludger Pistor as Werner Voss
- Joe Montana as Jack
- Hetti Bywater as Lol's Girlfriend
- Ronnie Fox as Klash
- Davinia Taylor as Sarah
- Peter Vollebregt as Jan Van Dorn
- Sura Dohnke as Hannah
- Faye Tozer as Police Woman
- Faruk Pruti as Russian 1
- Robert Cambrinus as Anthony Forker
- Hannah Blamires as Clubber
- Michael Suluk as Tiny
- Tommy McDonnell as Joe Collishaw
- Craig Henderson as Dillan
- Sarah Weatherstone as Zoe
- Dominic Burke as Police Forensic Officer (as Dom Burke)
- Julie Vollono as Ferry Passenger
- Scott Bradley as German Hooligan
- Timothy J. Murphy as Police Officer
- Christian Weathersone as Ellie's son
- Elodie Hill as Ellie's daughter
- Russell Balogh as Dutch Hooligan (uncredited)
- James Michael Rankin as German Thug (uncredited)
- Deborah Rosan as Lol's Family – Funeral Scene (uncredited)
- Chris Wilson as Restaurant Owner (uncredited)
- Tommy Penfold as Barman
- Dwain Stephens as Black Waiter
- Louisa Martin as Graveside Choir member (uncredited)

== Release and reception ==
The premiere of the film took place at the Odeon in Covent Garden, London on 29 August 2012. The premiere was attended by stars of the film, such as Frank Harper, Craig Fairbrass, Keeley Hazell and Tony Denham, and other actors, such as Bruce Payne. The general release of the film took place on 7 September 2012. The film has received mixed reviews. The film has a rating of four out of five on Time Out's London magazine website, while The Daily Telegraph gave it a rating of two out of five and The Independent gave it a rating of one out of five. One reviewer stated that Harper just about pulls off the 'globe-hopping plot involving gangsters, drug deals, heists and more than a touch of double-crossing betrayal' and that whilst the film is 'sometimes predictable, it's never dull, with a fast-paced plot and a terrific cast'. Phelim O'Neill, who reviewed the film for The Guardian, stated that 'it's a low-budget film with enough ambition to take the action overseas, and it's nicely shot'. Joanna Ebuwa, who reviewed the film for Britflicks, stated that 'this is the best British gangster film since Lock, Stock and Two Smoking Barrels, it's thoroughly entertaining, funny, nostalgic and pokes fun at the police and the establishment. Harper has been studying from Guy Richie and is definitely one to watch'. John Parrot, who reviewed the film for The Film Review stated that 'St George's Day is so excessive, rude and genuinely Cockney that it may become a cult movie'. In contrast, Stephen Kelly of Total Film stated that 'not even the formidable presence of Charles Dance can salvage a script this woeful'.
