= Keeley Hazell =

English model, writer and actress (born 1986)

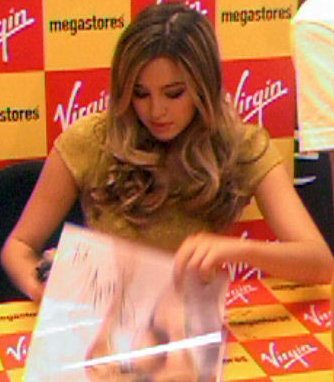
- Hazell in 2007
- Born: Keeley Rebecca Hazell; 18 September 1986 (age 40); Lewisham, London, England
- Occupations: Glamour model; actress
- Modelling information
- Height: 5 ft 6 in (1.68 m)
- Hair colour: Brown
- Eye colour: Hazel

Keeley Rebecca Hazell (born 18 September 1986) is an English model, actress and writer. A former Page 3 girl, she also worked with magazines such as FHM, Loaded, Nuts and Zoo Weekly. She has made numerous television appearances and has appeared in films including Horrible Bosses 2 (2014) and the television series Ted Lasso (2020).

== Career ==
=== Modelling ===
In 2002, aged 16, Hazell left school to work as a hairdresser. Her colleagues persuaded her to try modelling. Aged 17, she competed in The Daily Star's "Search for a Beach Babe" contest and won, but she was not old enough to pose for Page 3 and so went to study fashion at Lewisham College. Later, a friend told her about The Sun's Page 3 Idol competition. Despite some initial uncertainty about entering the contest, she submitted some photos. She won the contest in December 2004. She won a one-year exclusive glamour modelling contract with The Sun, in addition to £10,000 worth of clothing and a one-year membership to the Rex cinema and bar.

Hazell was regularly featured in Nuts and Zoo Weekly. In June 2005, she appeared on the cover of Maxim magazine and she also appeared on the front cover of FHM in September that year. In January 2006, she appeared on the cover of Loaded. She was on the cover of The Sun's 2006 and 2007 Page 3 calendars, in addition to releasing her own wall calendars; her 2007 calendar sold 30,000 copies in its first few days of release.

In 2008, Hazell and agent Ginny Mettrick co-founded a modelling agency called Muse Management. In 2009, Peta Todd stated in Loaded that Hazell had given up modelling and was in the United States receiving acting lessons, with the intention of pursuing an acting career. Her last appearance on Page 3 of The Sun was on 30 September 2009. In January 2013, Hazell made a return to modelling by appearing in FHM.

=== Film and television ===
Hazell had a small role in the 2006 film Cashback after it had been reworked from a short into a full-length film. The following year, she was in talks with producers to feature in a film based on the television series Baywatch.

In 2007, Hazell and IT expert Gary Schwartz co-presented Byte Me TV, an online programme that tried to explain technology in an easy-to-understand way. The following year she appeared in the BBC Three documentary Page Three Teens; and released a pop music single called "Voyeur" on Polydor Records.

In 2010, Hazell had her first lead role, in the short film Venus and the Sun, a comedic retelling of Ovid's myth, Venus and Adonis. She followed this up with a small role in the film Like Crazy, which won both the Grand and a Special Jury Prize at the 2011 Sundance Film Festival.

In 2012, Hazell played a supporting role in the gangster film St George's Day. She then starred in the 2013 comedy film Awful Nice and the 2015 horror film Whispers. Also in 2015, she landed a television role, in E!'s first scripted drama, The Royals, as Violet. She then appeared in the 2016 short film Queen of Hearts and two years later appeared in the 2018 TV Movie Vows of Deceit. In 2020 she appeared in the television series Ted Lasso as Bex, the girlfriend of the former owner of AFC Richmond, Rupert Mannion; she co-wrote episode 8 of season 3.

=== Other media appearances ===
Hazell was chosen to promote Sony Computer Entertainment Europe's Formula One 06 video game released in July 2006 for PlayStation 2 and PlayStation Portable; and Formula One Championship Edition for PlayStation 3 the following year. She then became the face of MotorStorm: Pacific Rift (2008) for PlayStation 3.

=== Writing ===
Hazell's essay collection, Everyone's Seen My Tits: Stories and Reflections from an Unlikely Feminist, was published by Grand Central Publishing in August 2025. Hazell took a one-woman show based on the book to the Edinburgh Festival Fringe in summer 2026.

Hazell is a staff writer on the series Ted Lasso. She penned the third-season episode titled "We'll Never Have Paris".

== Environmental and charitable work ==
Hazell was hailed by Conservative leader David Cameron in December 2006 as an "environmental hero" for her campaigns in The Sun, giving environmental tips such as turning lights off during the day. She was named alongside the likes of David Attenborough, Charles III and Arnold Schwarzenegger in the Tories' list.

Hazell backed a major breast cancer awareness campaign for Breakthrough Breast Cancer. The campaign, called 'TALK TLC', aimed to promote Breakthrough's breast health message about the need to be aware of the signs and symptoms of breast cancer. Hazell has also signed up to take part in the Breakthrough Generations Study consisting of 100,000 women and spanning 40 years; the study aims to be the largest and most comprehensive of its kind.

Hazell appeared naked in advertising posters for People for the Ethical Treatment of Animals (PETA), and she has been quoted as saying: "Once you learn how the fur trade treats animals, it's impossible to think of wearing fur as sexy or glamorous."

== Filmography ==
=== Film ===
Year	Title	Role	Notes
2006	Cashback	Frozen Girl in Sainsbury's	
2010	Venus & the Sun	Keeley	Short film
2011	Like Crazy	Sabrina	
2011	How to Stop Being a Loser	Kirsty	
2012	St George's Day	Peckham Princess	
2013	Awful Nice	Petra	
2014	Horrible Bosses 2	Miss Lang	
2015	Whispers	Catherine Caldwell	
2016	Queen of Hearts	Amy	Short film

=== Television ===
Year	Title	Role	Notes
2012	The Beauty Inside	Alex #26	Web series, 5 episodes
2013	Happily Divorced	Brook	1 episode
2015–2018	The Royals	Violet	7 episodes
2018	Deadly Matrimony	Cindy Steele	Television film
2020–2023	Ted Lasso	Bex	7 episodes

== Polls and honours ==
- Winner of The Sun's "Page 3 Idol 2004"
- #17 in Loaded's "100 Peachiest Celebrity Chests 2005"
- #1 in Zoo's "Britain's 10 Sexiest Models"
- #1 in Zoo's "100 Sexiest Bodies 2005"
- #1 in The Sun's "Favourite Page 3 Girls of All Time"
- Voted "Best Page 3 Girl" at the FHM 2006 Bloke Awards
- #2 in FHM's "100 Sexiest Women In The World 2006"
- Winner of The Sun Online's "Reality Babe Cup"
- #1 in Zoo's "100 Sexiest Bodies 2006"
- "Best Celeb Body 2006" (More readers' survey)
- #19 in AskMen.com "Top 99 Most Desirable Women 2007 Edition"
- #9 in FHM's "50 Most Eligible Bachelorettes 2007"
- #2 in FHM's "100 Sexiest Women in the World 2007"
- #3 in FHM's "100 Sexiest Women in the World 2008"
- #2 in IGN Babe Election 2008
- #4 in AskMen.com "Top 99 Most Desirable Women 2009 Edition"
- #5 in FHM's "100 Sexiest Women in the World 2009"
- #3 seed in KJR-AM's "Bigger Dance Bracket", eliminated in Championship by Megan Fox
- #5 in FHM's "100 Sexiest Women in the World 2010"
- #8 in FHM's "100 Sexiest Women in the World 2012"
- #21 in FHM's "100 Sexiest Women in the World 2013"

== See also ==
- Lad culture
- Lad mags

Awards and achievements
Preceded by Krystle Gohel	Page 3 Idol; 2004	Succeeded by Freya Haseldine
