= FHM's 100 Sexiest Women (UK) =

Annual listing compiled by FHM magazine

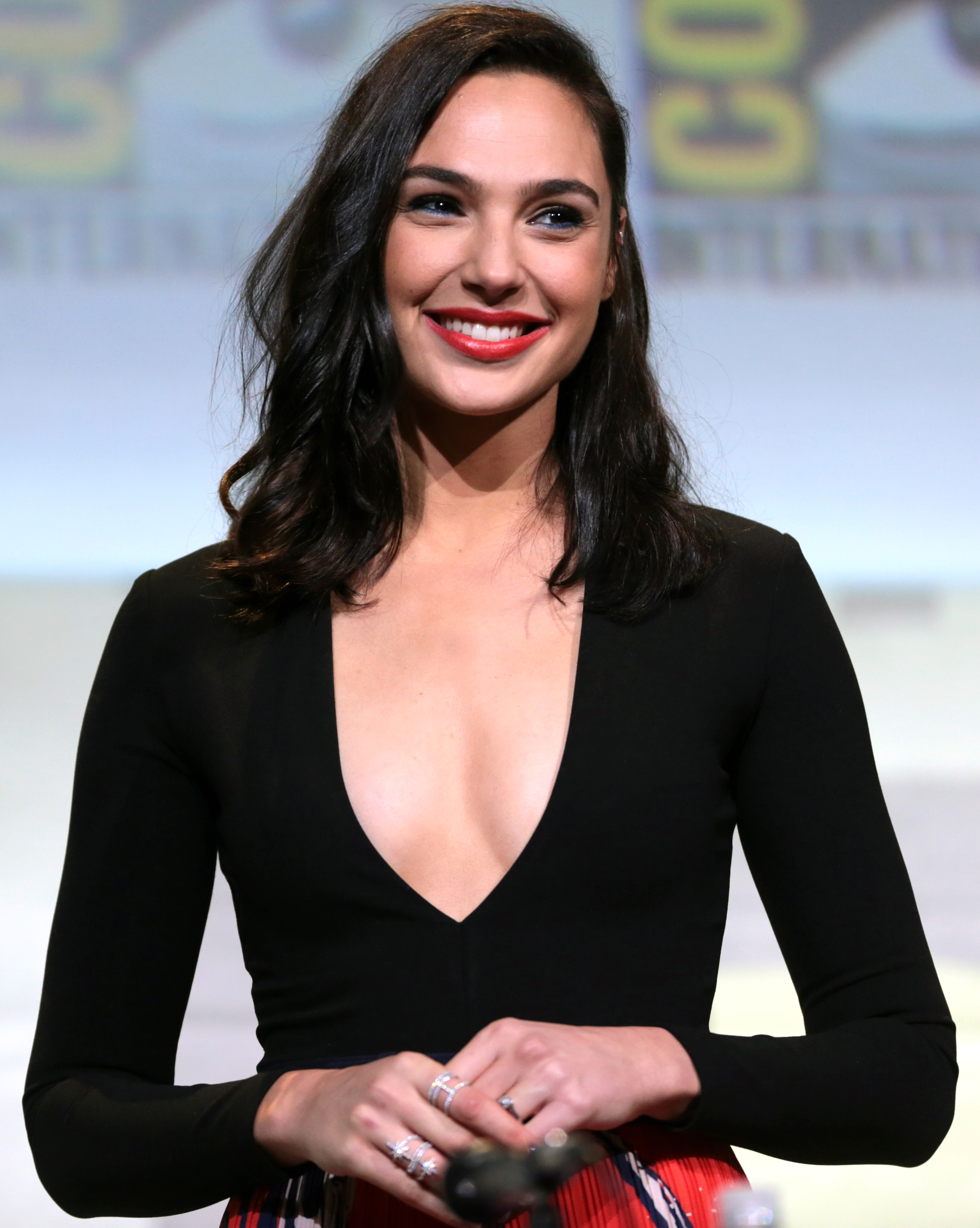
As of 2017, the Israeli actress Gal Gadot is the last winner of FHM's 100 Sexiest Women.

FHM's 100 Sexiest Women was an annual listing compiled by the monthly British men's lifestyle magazine FHM, based on which women they believe to be the "sexiest". As of 2017, each year's list is first announced through a section on FHM's official website, FHM.com. The first listing was published in 1995 and was voted for by a panel of 250 judges. The inaugural winner was German supermodel Claudia Schiffer. From 1996 to 2015, the poll was instead voted for by the general public with, at its height, several million votes being cast each year. Subsequent winners have included the British singer Cheryl, the American actress Halle Berry, and Jennifer Lopez. (Note: As of 2017, the only people to top the list more than once are Jennifer Lopez and Cheryl.) At 36 years old, Berry is the oldest woman ever to top the listing, while Lopez is the first to top the list more than once. By the time FHM ceased publication of its print edition in January 2016, the 100 Sexiest Women list had been compiled 21 times. The most recent holder of the Sexiest Woman title was Israeli actress Gal Gadot in 2017.

Alongside the 100 Sexiest Women list, FHM has also twice published a "Most Eligible Bachelorettes" list, in 2006 and 2007, to celebrate qualities such as "talent, star quality and cash". These lists were topped by the American actress Mischa Barton and the American socialite Kimberly Stewart, respectively. To commemorate the 10th and 20th anniversaries of the 100 Sexiest Women list, two one-off charts were compiled in April 2004 and May 2014, to recognise the sexiest women up to those points. The winner of the 2004 list was English singer Louise Redknapp, who had placed on every 100 Sexiest list since 1996, while the 2014 chart topper was singer Rachel Stevens, who had peaked at number two in 2001, 2002 and 2004.

== History ==
The first 100 Sexiest Women list was published in 1995, and was compiled exclusively by a panel of 250 judges. German supermodel Claudia Schiffer topped the inaugural chart. The following year's poll was the first to be opened up to the general public. A total of 10,000 votes were cast, with American actress Gillian Anderson being announced as the winner in September. A spokesman for FHM described her as the "thinking man's crumpet" and a "surprise winner". Anderson had posed half-naked on the front cover of the magazine earlier that year.

The 1999 "100 Sexiest Women" poll was launched by projecting a 60 ft (18 m) naked image of Gail Porter onto the Palace of Westminster.

Over subsequent years, the list's popularity continued to grow. The 1998 poll was voted on by half a million readers, with its companion issue being sold sealed inside a plastic cover. Martin Daubney, a former features editor of FHM, noted that it added a "sense of mystique and occasion" to the issue, which went on to sell 936,000 copies. The issue's cover girl was British TV presenter Cat Deeley, who had placed at number seven; the 100 Sexiest winner was Playboy model Jenny McCarthy. The following year, FHM publicists promoted the poll by projecting a 60 ft naked image of British TV presenter Gail Porter onto the front of the Palace of Westminster. A FHM spokesman remarked: "We want to up the voting frenzy for the poll ... It is a cheeky way of increasing interest." Porter was placed at number eight in the chart that year, while American actress Sarah Michelle Gellar was number one.

The first person to top the 100 Sexiest Women list more than once was American singer Jennifer Lopez, who placed at number one in 2000 and 2001. Speaking about being named the sexiest woman in the world for a second year running, Lopez said that she was "overwhelmed" and added: "Any woman who says they don't like being called sexy, they're lying." By 2002, the list was attracting more than five million votes – that year, Russian tennis player Anna Kournikova was number one. A further five million votes were cast the following year, when American actress Halle Berry was named as the world's sexiest. At 36 years old, Berry was the oldest woman to top the list. She responded: "Wow, that's a pretty heady title. I'm not so sure I live up to it, but thank you anyway." The first British woman to top the listing was the model Kelly Brook, who was named the world's sexiest in 2005, the most successful poll to that point. As of 2017, Brook has been featured in the top ten of FHM's 100 Sexiest Women ten times, which is more than any other entrant.

The 2011 list was noted for featuring an androgynous male model, Andrej Pejić, who was voted at number 98 on the poll (Pejić later came out as a trans woman in 2013 and changed her name to Andreja). FHM caused controversy when the entry's accompanying blurb warned its readers to "pass the sick bucket" and described Pejic as a "thing". Following a backlash, FHM removed the text from their website, spoke directly with Pejić and issued a public apology, saying that the online entry "wasn't subbed prior to going live". The final 100 Sexiest Women poll to be voted for by the public was published in 2015, before FHM went out of print in January the following year. The list included its oldest entrant ever, 80-year-old food writer Mary Berry, who was placed at number 74, while the sexiest woman that year was British actress Michelle Keegan. Speaking in November 2015 as FHM suspended its print publication, a spokesman reflected that the poll was what the magazine was best known for, and that it had "helped propel the careers of many well-known actresses, musicians and models". Subsequent 100 Sexiest Women lists have been compiled by FHM's writers themselves, and have been published on FHM.com. As of December 2017, the last winner is Gal Gadot.

== 100 Sexiest Women winners ==
100 Sexiest Women
Year	Winner	Top ten	Ref.
1995	Claudia Schiffer (Note: Inaugural list compiled exclusively by a panel of 250 judges.)	2nd: Uma Thurman; 3rd: Nastassja Kinski; 4th: Elizabeth Hurley; 5th: Michelle Pfeiffer; 6th: Tabatha Cash; 7th: Demi Moore; 8th: Daryl Hannah; 9th: Julie Christie; 10th: Sherilyn Fenn	
1996	Gillian Anderson (Note: First list to be voted on by the general public.)	2nd: Louise Nurding; 3rd: Cameron Diaz; 4th: Teri Hatcher; 5th: Sandra Bullock; 6th: Jennifer Aniston; 7th: Emmanuelle Béart; 8th: Elizabeth Hurley; 9th: Demi Moore; 10th: Pamela Anderson	
1997	Teri Hatcher	2nd: Jennifer Aniston; 3rd: Gillian Anderson; 4th: Louise Nurding; 5th: Jenny McCarthy; 6th: Yasmine Bleeth; 7th: Cameron Diaz; 8th: Geri Halliwell; 9th: Courteney Cox; 10th: Dannii Minogue	
1998	Jenny McCarthy	2nd: Denise van Outen; 3rd: Louise Nurding; 4th: Jennifer Aniston; 5th: Cameron Diaz; 6th: Carmen Electra; 7th: Cat Deeley; 8th: Melanie Sykes; 9th: Courteney Cox; 10th: Gillian Anderson	
1999	Sarah Michelle Gellar	2nd: Louise Redknapp; 3rd: Kelly Brook; 4th: Catherine Zeta-Jones; 5th: Jenny McCarthy; 6th: Jennifer Aniston; 7th: Cameron Diaz; 8th: Gail Porter; 9th: Cat Deeley; 10th: Melanie Sykes	
2000	Jennifer Lopez	2nd: Britney Spears; 3rd: Sarah Michelle Gellar; 4th: Anna Kournikova; 5th: Kelly Brook; 6th: Shania Twain; 7th: Cat Deeley; 8th: Cameron Diaz; 9th: Louise Redknapp; 10th: Jennifer Aniston	
2001	Jennifer Lopez	2nd: Rachel Stevens; 3rd: Britney Spears; 4th: Kelly Brook; 5th: Denise Richards; 6th: Salma Hayek; 7th: Cat Deeley; 8th: Charlize Theron; 9th: Carmen Electra; 10th: Alyson Hannigan	
2002	Anna Kournikova	2nd: Rachel Stevens; 3rd: Britney Spears; 4th: Jennifer Lopez; 5th: Kelly Brook; 6th: Kylie Minogue; 7th: Carmen Electra; 8th: Holly Valance; 9th: Shakira; 10th: Kristin Kreuk	
2003	Halle Berry	2nd: Holly Valance; 3rd: Britney Spears; 4th: Rachel Stevens; 5th: Carmen Electra; 6th: Jennifer Lopez; 7th: Jennifer Love Hewitt; 8th: Anna Kournikova; 9th: Kylie Minogue; 10th: Jolene Blalock	
2004	Britney Spears	2nd: Rachel Stevens; 3rd: Beyoncé; 4th: Carmen Electra; 5th: Holly Valance; 6th: Halle Berry; 7th: Jennifer Lopez; 8th: Jordan; 9th: Angelina Jolie; 10th: Elisha Cuthbert	
2005	Kelly Brook	2nd: Cheryl Tweedy; 3rd: Angelina Jolie; 4th: Michelle Ryan; 5th: Elisha Cuthbert; 6th: Britney Spears; 7th: Abi Titmuss; 8th: Sarah Harding; 9th: Beyoncé; 10th: Charlotte Church	
2006	Keira Knightley	2nd: Keeley Hazell; 3rd: Scarlett Johansson; 4th: Angelina Jolie; 5th: Kelly Brook; 6th: Cheryl Tweedy; 7th: Beyoncé; 8th: Evangeline Lilly; 9th: Jessica Alba; 10th: Jessica Simpson	
2007	Jessica Alba	2nd: Keeley Hazell; 3rd: Eva Longoria; 4th: Adriana Lima; 5th: Scarlett Johansson; 6th: Hayden Panettiere; 7th: Cheryl Cole; 8th: Angelina Jolie; 9th: Emily Scott; 10th: Elisha Cuthbert	
2008	Megan Fox	2nd: Jessica Alba; 3rd: Keeley Hazell; 4th: Elisha Cuthbert; 5th: Hayden Panettiere; 6th: Scarlett Johansson; 7th: Cheryl Cole; 8th: Hilary Duff; 9th: Angelina Jolie; 10th: Keira Knightley	
2009	Cheryl Cole	2nd: Megan Fox; 3rd: Jessica Alba; 4th: Britney Spears; 5th: Keeley Hazell; 6th: Adriana Lima; 7th: Elisha Cuthbert; 8th: Kristin Kreuk; 9th: Anna Friel; 10th: Freida Pinto	
2010	Cheryl Cole	2nd: Megan Fox; 3rd: Marisa Miller; 4th: Frankie Sandford; 5th: Keeley Hazell; 6th: Kristen Stewart; 7th: Kelly Brook; 8th: Adriana Lima; 9th: Jessica Alba; 10th: Abbey Clancy	
2011	Rosie Huntington-Whiteley	2nd: Katy Perry; 3rd: Rihanna; 4th: Megan Fox; 5th: Olivia Wilde; 6th: Brooklyn Decker; 7th: Marisa Miller; 8th: Kelly Brook; 9th: Nicole Scherzinger; 10th: Irina Shayk	
2012	Tulisa	2nd: Cheryl Cole; 3rd: Rihanna; 4th: Rosie Jones; 5th: Georgia Salpa; 6th: Katy Perry; 7th: Megan Fox; 8th: Keeley Hazell; 9th: Mila Kunis; 10th: Emily Atack	
2013	Mila Kunis	2nd: Rihanna; 3rd: Helen Flanagan; 4th: Michelle Keegan; 5th: Kelly Brook; 6th: Kaley Cuoco; 7th: Pixie Lott; 8th: Kate Upton; 9th: Cheryl Cole; 10th: Georgia Salpa	
2014	Jennifer Lawrence	2nd: Michelle Keegan; 3rd: Rihanna; 4th: Emily Ratajkowski; 5th: Kaley Cuoco; 6th: Mila Kunis; 7th: Beyoncé; 8th: Lucy Mecklenburgh; 9th: Nicole Scherzinger; 10th: Scarlett Johansson	
2015	Michelle Keegan	2nd: Kendall Jenner; 3rd: Jennifer Lawrence; 4th: Kate Upton; 5th: Caroline Flack; 6th: Ariana Grande; 7th: Margot Robbie; 8th: Lucy Mecklenburgh; 9th: Emilia Clarke; 10th: Kelly Brook	
2016	Margot Robbie	2nd: Scarlett Johansson; 3rd: Emily Ratajkowski; 4th: Beyoncé; 5th: Jennifer Lawrence; 6th: Taylor Swift; 7th: Kendall Jenner; 8th: Emilia Clarke; 9th: Ciara; 10th: Kim Kardashian	
2017	Gal Gadot	2nd: Emilia Clarke; 3rd: Alexis Ren; 4th: Margot Robbie; 5th: Scarlett Johansson; 6th: Lais Ribeiro; 7th: Emily Ratajkowski; 8th: Megan Fox; 9th: Beyoncé; 10th: Jennifer Lawrence	

== Most Eligible Bachelorettes ==
Alongside the 100 Sexiest Women list, FHM also twice published a "Most Eligible Bachelorettes" list, which compiled women based on their "eligibility" and was voted for by the magazine's readership. Unlike the 100 Sexiest Women list, this list also considered qualities such as "talent, star quality and cash" as well as sex appeal in its compilation. Similar lists published by the US version of FHM had been topped by women such as model Lauren Bush and socialite Paris Hilton.

The 2006 list was voted for by more than 3,000 FHM readers, and was published in March of that year. It was topped by American actress Mischa Barton. Speaking about the result, FHM editor Ross Brown remarked: "Our most eligible list consists of much more than just sex appeal and our readers recognise a good catch when they see one." The following year, the Most Eligible Bachelorettes list was topped by American socialite Kimberly Stewart. The list received more than 10,000 votes from FHM's readership, and was featured in the April 2007 issue of the magazine. An FHM spokesperson stated: "Kimberly Stewart has all the attributes you want in a woman. She's rich, gorgeous, likes to party and she's the daughter of a legend."

Most Eligible Bachelorettes
Year	Winner	Top ten	Ref.
2006	Mischa Barton	2nd: Naomi Watts; 3rd: Kate Moss; 4th: Joss Stone; 5th: Zara Phillips; 6th: Elizabeth Jagger; 7th: Keira Knightley; 8th: Rosamund Pike; 9th: Tamara Ecclestone; 10th: Mickey Sumner	
2007	Kimberly Stewart	2nd: Carmen Electra; 3rd: Princess Beatrice of York; 4th: Sarah Harding; 5th: Scarlett Johansson; 6th: Lindsay Lohan; 7th: Maria Sharapova; 8th: Paris Hilton; 9th: Keeley Hazell; 10th: Keira Knightley	

== Anniversary lists ==
On two occasions, FHM has produced special lists to mark anniversaries of the 100 Sexiest Women chart. To commemorate the tenth edition of the poll in May 2004, FHM published a list ranking the 50 sexiest women of the previous ten years. The list was topped by the English singer Louise Redknapp, who had placed on every 100 Sexiest list since 1996. Ten years later, in May 2014, FHM published a list of the "Sexiest Women of All Time", compiled using a new analysis based on the previous 20 years' worth of polls. The winner was the English singer Rachel Stevens. Stevens had been featured on 11 lists at that point, but had never been placed first on any of the annual lists, instead peaking at number two in 2001, 2002 and 2004. On learning the result, she remarked: "To win this award feels absolutely amazing. ... It's brilliant."

Sexiest Women of the Decade
Year	Winner	Top ten	Ref.
2004	Louise Redknapp	2nd: Cameron Diaz; 3rd: Kylie Minogue; 4th: Pamela Anderson; 5th: Carmen Electra; 6th: Kelly Brook; 7th: Jennifer Aniston; 8th: Dannii Minogue; 9th: Britney Spears; 10th: Jordan	

Sexiest Women of All Time
Year	Winner	Top ten	Ref.
2014	Rachel Stevens	2nd: Jennifer Lopez; 3rd: Kelly Brook; 4th: Britney Spears; 5th: Cheryl Cole; 6th: Halle Berry; 7th: Jennifer Aniston; 8th: Anna Kournikova; 9th: Keeley Hazell; 10th: Jenny McCarthy	
