= Awful Nice =

- Theatrical release poster
- Directed by: Todd Sklar
- Written by: Alex Rennie; Todd Sklar
- Produced by: Joe Krigsfeld; Jason Krigsfeld; Michael Forstein; Adam Paulsen; Todd Sklar; Maury Steinman; Brock Williams
- Starring: Alex Rennie; James Pumphrey; Christopher Meloni; Brett Gelman; Keeley Hazell; Laura Ramsey; Josh Fadem; Charlie Sanders; Jon Gabrus; D.C. Pierson; Dominic Dierkes
- Cinematography: Adam Ginsberg
- Edited by: Kamau Bilal
- Music by: Mark Harrison
- Production companies: Brothers K Range Life Entertainment
- Distributed by: Screen Media Films
- Release dates: March 8, 2013 (SXSW); March 7, 2014 (United States)
- Running time: 93 minutes
- Country: United States
- Language: English

Awful Nice is a 2013 American comedy film directed by Todd Sklar and written by Sklar and Alex Rennie. The film stars Rennie, James Pumphrey, Christopher Meloni, Brett Gelman, Keeley Hazell and Josh Fadem. The film was released on March 7, 2014, by Screen Media Films.

== Cast ==
- Christopher Meloni as Jon Charbineau
- Alex Rennie as Dave Brouillette
- James Pumphrey as Jim Brouillette
- Brett Gelman as Ivan
- Laura Ramsey as Lauren
- Keeley Hazell as Petra
- Henry Zebrowski as Jasper
- Zahn McClarnon as Romulus
- Saginaw Grant as Jonas
- Charlie Sanders as Sheriff Wegman
- Josh Fadem as Deputy Bruce
- Jon Gabrus as Klaus
- D.C. Pierson as Sven
- Dominic Dierkes as Yven
- Kerry Barker as Svetlana
- Hari Leigh as Michelle
- Nick Renkoski as Nick Becker
- John Turk as Rick Ohlson
- Yakov Smirnoff as Himself

== Release ==
The film premiered at South by Southwest on March 8, 2013. The film was released on March 7, 2014, by Screen Media Films.
