= Boxelder Creek (Belle Fourche River tributary) =

Stream in South Dakota, U.S.

Coordinates: 44°46′15″N 103°56′58″W

Boxelder Creek is a stream in the U.S. state of South Dakota. It is a tributary of the Belle Fourche River.

Boxelder Creek was named for the box elder trees on its course.

== See also ==
- List of rivers of South Dakota
