= Chao pho =

Organized crime bosses in Thailand

Chao pho organized crime gangs
- Territory: Thailand
- Ethnicity: Thais
- Activities: drug trafficking, corruption, pimping, procurement, human trafficking, slave labor
- Allies: United Wa State Army (Red Wa sindicate)

Chao pho (Thai: เจ้าพ่อ, lit. 'godfather') is a term used in Thailand to describe the boss of organized crime groups.

== Meaning of the term ==
Chao pho or jao poh literally means 'godfather'. Chao pho, mostly based in the provinces, have business interests in both legitimate and criminal activities. Moreover, they have groups of associates and followers, move closely with powerful bureaucrats, policemen and military figures, sit in positions in local administration, and play a key role in parliamentary elections.

== Activities ==
According to Thai authorities, there are chao pho groups in 39 of Thailand's 77 provinces. From these provinces they work like a local mafia as they are active in both illegal as well as some legitimate businesses. They are involved in a wide range of criminal activities such as prostitution, drug trafficking, illegal gambling and others. They are known for cooperating with the Red Wa (who are associated with the United Wa State Army) for the trafficking and sale of narcotics.

== Cultural depictions ==
According to Chachavalpongpun, P.: "Fear is a crucial element in Thai political culture, [which] also serves as a factor in shaping a hierarchical relationship among members in society. Influential people (phu mee ittiphon), godfathers (chao pho), and gangsters (nakleng) have their characters depicted within the deep dichotomy of the benevolent and fearful."

Chao pao sometimes partake in charity. For example, the phu mee ittiphon frequently donates money for religious events and provides scholarships for poor students. However, their charitable works go in tandem with their crimes.

Scholars in different countries often refer to chao pho by different names, e.g., "local bosses" in the Philippines, "local oligarchs" in Indonesia, and towkays in Malaysia.
