= Randy Roth =

American murderer (born 1954)

- Born: 26 December 1954 (age 71); Bismarck, North Dakota
- Occupation: Auto mechanic
- Spouse(s): Cynthia Roth, Janis Roth
- Children: Gregory Roth
- Parent(s): Gordon and Lizabeth Roth
- Status: Incarcerated at Stafford Creek Corrections Center
- Convictions: 1975: Second degree burglary 1992: Theft, insurance fraud, first degree murder
- Penalty: 1975: 14 years in prison with 13 years, 11 months, 14 days suspended 1992: fifty one years in prison

Randy Roth (born December 26, 1954) is a convicted murderer and thief from Washington. He was convicted of the 1991 murder of his fourth wife, Cynthia Baumgartner Roth, and he was suspected of murdering his second wife, Janis Roth, in 1981, but was never tried. In both deaths, he was the only witness. He claimed the activities that led to the deaths were the ideas of his deceased wives (“romantic” notions in both cases) and he had the bodies cremated as quickly as could be arranged. He was also convicted of stealing in the form of defrauding insurers and the Social Security Administration. In 1975, he was sentenced to one year for theft, then in 1992 was sentenced to 50 years for first degree murder. At least two true crime books are based on Roth's crimes, A Rose for Her Grave by Ann Rule and Fatal Charm by Carlton Smith.

== Early life and family ==
Randy Roth was born December 26, 1954, one of five children of Gordon and Lizabeth Roth. The family moved from North Dakota to Washington in the late 50s. Randy and his brother David, also a convicted murderer, later gave conflicting reports on the nature of their upbringing. David claimed their father was abusive and their mother supportive. Randy apparently bonded with his father more closely and remained in touch with him throughout his life while snubbing his mother, telling friends she was dead or mentally unstable. The Roths were practicing Catholics, but they nonetheless divorced in 1971. In 1977, David Roth was charged with the murder of a hitchhiking girl he picked up. The trial lasted from November 1979 to March 1980 and ended with a conviction; he served 26 years for the murder of Elizabeth Roberts.

Lizabeth Roth would later claim that her husband had been a strict, abusive parent who discouraged his sons from displaying any emotion and if they'd grown up lacking in empathy for other people, it was not her fault. Friends of Randy Roth would also describe his extreme misogyny and dislike of women or anything feminine. Only women who were submissive and did not challenge him met his approval.

According to former girlfriends, Randy had developed a reputation by high school of being a bully and a punk who enjoyed playing cruel pranks on others. He was dominating and controlling of his girlfriends, and his male friends were only those who toadied to him. He enjoyed fixing cars and driving them recklessly on country back roads. After graduating Meadowdale High School in 1973, Roth enlisted in the Marine Corps, wanting to emulate his movie hero Billy Jack. Shortly before his deployment he robbed a service station where he had previously been employed, but he was not charged with the crime at that time. Roth was disappointed at his time in the Marines as he ended up serving as a file clerk in Okinawa rather than the combat action he'd fantasized about. After less than a year, he was discharged when his mother (who was living on welfare) wrote a letter to the service protesting that it was a hardship to have him gone and he was needed home to support her.

Upon returning home, he became engaged to a girl named Terri Kirkbride. Her parents let Roth live in an empty house they were selling, but she broke off the relationship after finding another woman's purse in the house. A few months later, her parents' home was robbed and she told police that Roth was responsible. In addition, Kirkbride told them about the service station robbery two years earlier, which she said happened because she'd gotten pregnant and Roth needed money to get her an abortion. Charges related to the previous stick-up were dropped, and Roth served only two weeks in jail. Shortly after being released, Roth married the other woman he'd been seeing (Donna Sanchez). She gave birth to a son Gregg in 1978. Shortly thereafter and without any explanation, he filed for divorce and obtained custody of Gregg. Donna Sanchez retained visitation rights and periodically came to visit her son and former husband over the years.

== Janis Roth ==
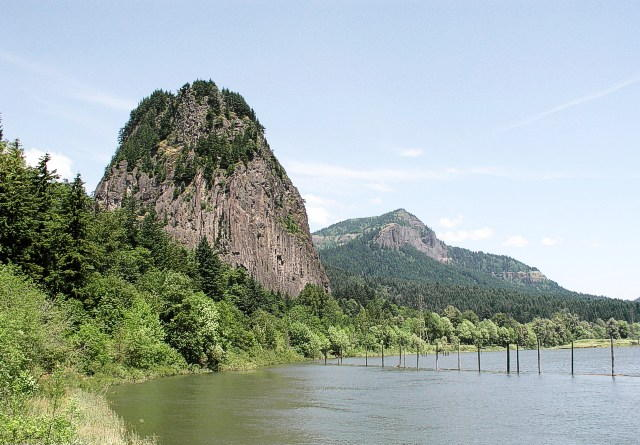
Beacon Rock, where Janis Roth fell to her death

In early 1981, Randy Roth met Janis Miranda, also a divorced single parent, and they married that March. She had come from an impoverished upbringing in Texas, raised by a mother who labored to support her several children after their alcoholic father abandoned them. Marrying a serviceman, she gave birth to a daughter Jalina while stationed in Germany, but the marriage ended in divorce and Janis took her infant child to the West Coast seeking to begin a new life. Randy insisted on ample life insurance for his new wife as they were buying a house together and he told her he wanted to be able to pay the mortgage if the worst should come to pass. Janis had been extremely excited about her new husband, but after a few months, her friends started to notice that she was acting very strange and wary of everything. Shortly after the wedding, her Ford Pinto vanished and was later discovered in a field with its engine missing. She and Randy collected insurance money from the incident.

On the day after Thanksgiving 1981, Randy Roth took Janis hiking at Beacon Rock, where she plummeted to her death. There were no witnesses to the fall besides Roth and the stories he told to others about the incident were contradictory. Police and rescue workers were unable to locate the body for several hours after the fall, and it was later determined that it would have been virtually impossible for her to have fallen from where Roth claimed the accident occurred. Although some suspicion was raised at the time that Roth had pushed his wife, there did not seem to be sufficient evidence to proceed with an arrest and trial. A police detective interviewed Roth in his home two months after Janis's death, but failed to obtain any meaningful information. Roth arranged the same day to have his wife cremated and filed a claim on her life insurance policy early the next morning, while failing to contact her friends and family and inform them of her death. He also planned to adopt her daughter Jalina, however Janis had already arranged that the girl was to be raised by her family in Texas should something happen to her.

For the next 2 1/2 years after Janis's death, Randy Roth devoted himself to working as a mechanic and raising his son. He moved to a new house in Mountlake Terrace, where he befriended his neighbor Ben Goodwin and his family. The Roths and Goodwins remained good friends for most of the following six years, but Randy secretly seduced their teenage daughter, Brittany, with the promise of eventually marrying her when she was 18. Roth also told numerous fictitious tales of serving in Vietnam, making his brief stint as a Marine Corps file clerk appear as if he had been in action similar to movies like Hamburger Hill. Ben Goodwin, who was a Vietnam vet, became suspicious of Roth's stories. The latter never told his age to anyone, but Goodwin was skeptical that he'd really served in Vietnam.

Roth also upset the Goodwins with his harsh discipline of Gregg and after their son Ryan informed school counselors, he was put on probation by Child Protective Services for six months.

In 1985, Roth married twenty-one-year old Donna Clift, another divorced mother with a small child. Donna had gotten pregnant with her daughter, Brittany, while still in high school. Donna and Brittany's father married, but the marriage fell apart, and she moved from her native Arizona to Washington. Randy quickly talked her into marrying him, but as usual didn't tell her his age or much about his life beyond various contradictory stories. He upset Donna by playing various mean-spirited jokes on her 3-year-old daughter and becoming cold and aloof after the honeymoon. When Roth proposed adopting Brittany and becoming her legal guardian, Donna refused. While he wasn't home, she looked at some of his personal documents and tax returns in an effort to find out whatever secrets he was keeping from her. After only three months, their marriage ended when a family rafting trip on the Skykomish River ended in disaster. Randy went out with Donna alone on an inflatable raft, which he attempted to steer through the rapids into sharp rocks. A terrified Donna immediately filed for divorce afterwards.

Not long afterwards, he befriended Mary Jo Phillips, a divorced mother of three children. Roth became engaged to her, but abruptly broke it off when he found that she'd been treated for cancer once before and wasn't insurable.

== Cynthia Roth ==
Roth remained single until 1990, when he met Cynthia Loucks Baumgartner at one of his son's Little League games. Born in 1957, she was the child of an older couple who had a teenage son and had been trying unsuccessfully for years to have another baby. Raised in a deeply religious family, she married Tom Baumgartner at the age of 21, and their sons, Tyson and Rylie, were born in 1979 and 1981, respectively. Tom worked hard as a parcel carrier for the USPS to provide for his family, but in 1985 he suddenly came down with Hodgkin's Disease and died at the age of 29. Cynthia was well provided for with various survivors' benefits and the support of her family and close friend Lori Baker, and so she didn't need to work. Since she refused to marry a divorced man due to her religious beliefs, Randy Roth told her nothing about his marriages except that Janis Miranda had accidentally fallen to her death. That August, the two abruptly ran off to Las Vegas to get married, something that shocked Cynthia's family. Randy Roth quickly put up his house for sale and purchased a big new home in Woodinville where he moved with his new enlarged family. Cynthia gradually became aware that Roth felt a need to control every aspect of her life, and did not want her doing anything on her own. Friends noticed her appearance and her housekeeping, which had always been beyond reproach in the past, were given less and less attention, and that Cynthia seemed to regret her marriage to Roth. Roth was also physically and mentally abusive to all three boys.

On July 23, 1991, just a few weeks short of their first wedding anniversary, the couple took Cynthia's two sons on a day trip to Lake Sammamish, the same lake where Ted Bundy had abducted two young women years earlier. As on the day of the Bundy abductions, it was a scorching hot summer day, with temperatures around the 90 °F mark when the Roths arrived and the beach was crowded. Randy and Cynthia left the boys to play in the designated swimming area while they paddled their 11 feet (3.4 m) inflatable raft into deeper waters. Several hours later Randy Roth returned with an unresponsive Cynthia lying in the raft. She was treated at the scene, but all efforts were unsuccessful and after being taken to a hospital, was pronounced dead. Roth claimed that the wake from a speedboat had caused the raft to flip while Cynthia was swimming next to it and she had drowned as a result.

Roth's apparent lack of emotion and contradicting versions of how events had unfolded immediately led investigators to consider him a suspect, but there was no solid evidence that she had been forcibly drowned. Once again Roth failed to inform family and friends of the death, but immediately went about trying to collect on a large life insurance policy, nearly $400,000, that he had taken out on his wife. Again he arranged for a cremation as soon as the body was released despite strong objections from Cynthia's parents. Almost three months after the drowning, Roth apparently believed he was once again not going to be charged, and was therefore quite surprised on October 8 when police detectives showed up at Bill Pierre Ford to arrest him on suspicion of murder and that they had obtained a search warrant, thereby allowing them unfettered access to his home.

== Investigation ==
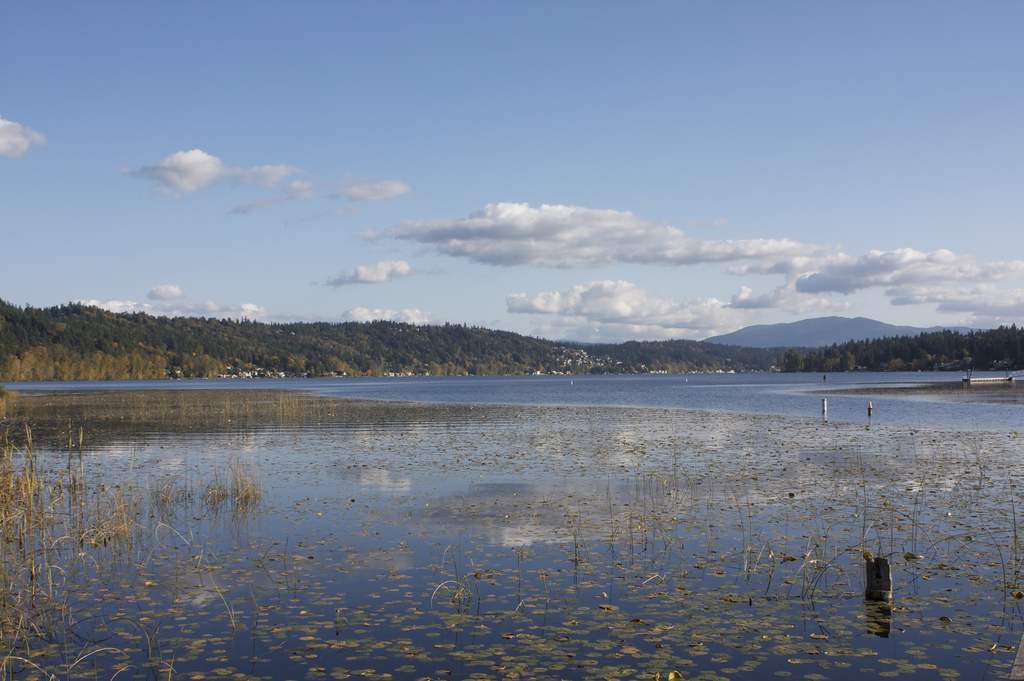
Investigators for both the prosecution and the defense repeatedly visited Lake Sammamish and recorded multiple attempts to recreate the conditions described by Roth's account of the drowning. Both sides used their own videotaped recreations during the trial.

Detectives and prosecutors assigned to the case knew from the beginning it would be difficult to secure a conviction. There was no physical evidence that Roth had forcibly drowned his wife and no eyewitnesses who actually saw him do so. They proceeded methodically, interviewing the families of his previous wives along with former friends and neighbors. They began to uncover evidence that Roth's motive was primarily financial, and that he had repeatedly attempted to defraud insurance companies and had stolen from his employers and nearly every job he had ever held. The investigators came to the conclusion that Randy Roth wanted a much more lavish lifestyle than he could afford on a mechanic's income, with expensive homes, multiple cars, and various other expensive toys for himself and his son. Roth's tax returns over the last decade showed that he typically averaged $20,000-$30,000 in annual income, well below what was needed for his lifestyle and that most of his money had come from insurance payments. He had discovered a talent for seducing single mothers with money, then disposing of them to fund his lifestyle. Lori Baker, a long time friend of Cynthia's, discovered that her will and other possessions were missing from her safe deposit box, and that Randy Roth was the last person to have accessed the box, two days after Cynthia's death. A second copy of the will was discovered in the county recording office. Roth had planned to adopt Cynthia's sons and raise them as his own while also collecting survivor's benefits for them and he was surprised and outraged to learn that she'd named Lori Baker as the legal guardian of them in the event of her death. When Baker came to collect the children's belongings, Roth let them into the house only reluctantly, would not let them take some of their possessions and proceeded to rant about how they'd "ruined" his scenario and he wouldn't have enough money to keep up his house payments. Had his scheme worked, he would have been financially set for life, collecting a huge insurance payment from Cynthia's death, plus survivor's benefits for both her sons, and would likely never need to work again. He could spend all his free time buying, selling, and fixing cars, and racing.

Shortly after Tyson and Rylie went to live with Lori Baker, Roth put the Woodinville home back on the market at a lower price than he'd paid for it, in an apparent desire to unload it as quickly as possible.

Speaking to investigators, Lori Baker talked about the safe deposit box and Cynthia's depressed, diminished personality in the final months of her life. She talked of divorcing Roth, but Baker said she would have never carried through on it because of her religious beliefs. After Tyson and Rylie moved in with her, she also learned for the first time about Roth's shockingly harsh parenting tactics, which Cynthia had never told her about. He regularly spanked the boys and Gregg with a belt, or would force them to perform dozens of squat thrusts if they misbehaved, even making them stand outside in their underwear during wintertime and kneel on gravel. He also had them watch graphic war movies like Hamburger Hill and Full Metal Jacket.

When the investigators talked to the boys themselves, they confirmed Roth's harsh punishments and also admitted that they'd seen him stealing items from Bill Pierre Ford numerous times. They said that he had sometimes been good to them and did fun things, but if given a choice, they really didn't want to continue living with him and that he'd not shown much of any emotion at their mother's death. He also started getting rid of Cynthia's belongings the day after her death and urged them to not be upset over anything.

Roth was not happy at learning that he wouldn't get custody of Tyson and Rylie and when the latter showed up with Lori Baker to collect theirs and Cynthia's belongings, he only grudgingly let them into the house. He became angrier and angrier as their visit progressed and wouldn't let the boys take some of their things. Whatever they did get from Roth had been jammed into trash bags and in many cases crushed and damaged.

Meanwhile, the Goodwins told investigators about Roth's having seduced their daughter and of a staged burglary he'd conducted on his own house in 1988 for insurance money, but had told nobody about this before because they were afraid of him. Roth had also carried on an affair with his son's babysitter for years, but her husband did nothing either for the same reason.

Talks with Roth's co-workers from Bill Pierre Ford found that he'd been in the habit of telling them exceptionally cruel things about Cynthia and that he referred to their marriage as merely a "contract" he planned to do away with on their first anniversary.

Investigators also revisited the death of Janis Roth ten years earlier and met with the detectives on that case, who had basically found themselves in the same situation. Roth's story had not quite made sense, he had not seemed like he was particularly upset that his wife was dead, but there was no direct evidence of foul play and the body had been speedily cremated.

Given the apparent pattern and the volume of witnesses to other criminal behaviors they were able to convince a judge to issue warrants for the arrest of Roth and a search of his home in Woodinville. While conducting the search King County detectives uncovered numerous pieces of evidence of several crimes and other dishonest acts. There were large amounts of equipment and materials belonging to the automotive dealership where Roth was employed. He had a large collection of military uniforms, plaques, medals, magazines, and books about the Vietnam War, some of which had fresh receipts from stores where he'd purchased them. A wetsuit was found in a closet, an odd item for someone claiming to be a weak swimmer to possess. There were no firearms in the house, but Roth had a closet full of Japanese throwing stars, nunchucks, knives, and homemade weapons such as baseball bats with nails driven into them. Although he'd often told women he had a vasectomy and found sex painful, the investigative team found several packages of condoms and sex-themed magazines. Cynthia's belongings had been stuffed in trash bags, including various family photos. Most of her decorative touches were removed from the house and thrown away as well. A poem written by Cynthia Roth was found in the garage. It began with the words "Randy does not 'love' Cindy, Randy hates Cindy" and went on to detail 44 complaints and criticisms Roth had directed at her regarding her appearance, appetite and sense of style. There was also a note she'd written to remind Roth of a local clinic holding PTSD therapy sessions for veterans, as she, like all of his wives, believed that he was suffering psychological distress from serving in Vietnam. Investigators also discovered that Roth had telephoned a friend just after being arrested and the friend had already removed further evidence at his behest.

Several reenactments undertaken at Lake Sammamish determined that it was virtually impossible to generate sufficient wake to flip the raft used by the Roths with type of powerboat used on the day of the drowning. They also found that the items Roth claimed to have recovered from the lake after the drowning but before heading to shore would have sunk rapidly if they had actually fallen from the boat. They learned about his brother David's murder conviction and they found out about Roth's previous conviction for robbery in 1973. They discovered that he had tried to claim survivors' benefits for Janis' daughter although she was not living with him and that he had tried to "double dip", to claim benefits for his own son after Cynthia's death, even though he was already receiving them on behalf of Janis. He had lied to the interviewer at the Social Security office about Cynthia, claiming she had divorced her first husband. All of these inconsistencies and dishonest acts would be of use to prosecutors at the trial.

== Trial ==
Roth's defense team attempted to have the entire case thrown out of court and when that failed, they attempted to suppress evidence and testimony regarding the faked burglaries. This maneuver also failed. Jury selection began in February 1992 and the trial began the following month.

From the beginning, the court room was packed with family and friends of the victim, as well as the press. Roth was visibly thinner and meeker looking than before and he appeared detached and lacking in emotion throughout the proceedings. He almost never looked directly at the jury or at relatives and old friends who testified against him. His defense team presented him as a man being persecuted because of bad luck, having lost two wives in tragic accidents. The prosecution portrayed him as emotionless, a greedy individual, who cared more about cars and money than his wife and children. Among the visitors to the trial were Roth's own mother and three sisters, thus instantly destroying his various exaggerated stories about the former. After three days, they refused to attend anymore, claiming that the whole thing was "a circus" and their son and brother was not receiving a fair trial.

Over 100 witnesses testified. A scuba instructor testified that he had trained Roth and that he was a skilled swimmer, explaining the wet suit found in the search and directly contradicting Roth's claim that he was simply too weak a swimmer to have been of any help to Cynthia. Eyewitnesses from Lake Sammamish described Roth slowly paddling the raft back to the beach, not appearing panicked and not signaling for help until he had beached the raft, despite the fact that lifeguards were warning him not to bring the raft into the designated swimming area. There was also testimony that despite alleging Cynthia's death was entirely caused by the raft flipping over, Roth had still had several bags of possessions on board when he returned to the beach and he was still wearing his prescription sunglasses, despite claiming to have been in the water himself at the moment the raft flipped. Jalina Miranda, daughter of Janis Roth, described how her mother had shown her a hidden envelope with money in it only a few days before her fatal fall from Beacon Rock. She told her daughter that the money was for her and that she was to take it if anything happened to her. More than a week after the accident Roth finally told Jalina that her mother was dead she retrieved the envelope from its hiding place, but Roth saw her with it and took it from her, promising he would spend the money on toys and presents for the girl. They never spoke again after that day and Roth never delivered on his promises. Possibly the most damning piece of evidence was the "Randy doesn't love Cindy" poem that had been found during the initial search. The Goodwins told about his staged burglary and seduction of their daughter. Donna Clift told about the terrifying raft trip on the Skykomish River. Mary Jo Phillips told how Roth had suddenly dumped her after finding that she was uninsurable. Tyson and Rylie Baumgartner testified about their stepfather's abusive parenting and his theft of automobile parts, along with their recollections of the day their mother died and Roth's unconcerned, unemotional behavior.

Roth eventually took the stand and gave more than 20 hours of testimony over the course of a week. When prosecutors challenged him on the inconsistencies in his account, he would claim others had misunderstood him or that he couldn't recall whatever incident was in question. He was forced to admit his various lies about having served in Vietnam, about being a martial arts instructor and owning a cattle ranch (his father Gordon owned a few sheep and cows), however, he insisted that anyone claiming his story about the drowning was false or inconsistent was misremembering what had happened that day. His demeanor on the stand was described as clinical and detached, showing apparent lack of emotion.

After closing arguments, the jury deliberated for 8 1/2 hours before returning a verdict: guilty of one count of murder in the first degree, one count of theft in the first degree, and one count of theft in the second degree.

== Aftermath ==
The financially strapped Skamania County, where Janis Roth had died, had stated they would not pursue a conviction for that death if Roth was sentenced to more than fifty years. He was sentenced to fifty years for the murder and one year for the theft charges and was therefore never charged with the death of Janis Roth. He will be eligible for parole in 2029. A 1994 appeal of the conviction failed. After the trial, Roth agreed to a plea bargain on additional theft charges stemming from the stolen materials and equipment discovered during the initial search of his home. Lori Baker, the friend named guardian of Cynthia Roth's sons, filed a lawsuit to bar Roth or his family from benefiting financially from either insurance payments or the sale of the couple's former home. Randy Roth is prisoner #245201 at the Stafford Creek Corrections Center. Roth's first wife Donna Sanchez remained a staunch defender of her husband, arguing that their marriage had been a happy one and she had no clue why he'd wanted a divorce.

=== Books ===
A Rose for Her Grave by Seattle based true crime writer Ann Rule profiles several murders of women but devotes 341 pages solely to the Roth case. Rule attended the trial in the press section. The book makes an analogy between Roth and the story of Bluebeard, known for murdering his wives after initially showing them great affection. Much time is spent describing the character and personal history of the various women who married or dated Roth in chronological order.

Fatal Charm by Carlton Smith starts off with the drowning of Cynthia Roth and the subsequent trial, and delved much deeper into Roth's early life and upbringing and the pre-trial motions that in retrospect were largely responsible for prosecutors obtaining a conviction.
