= Peta Todd =

English glamour model

- Born: 8 December 1986 (age 38); Newham, London, England
- Occupations: Former glamour model; Page 3 girl
- Spouse: Mark Cavendish (m. 2013)
- Children: 5
- Modelling information
- Height: 5 ft 10 in (1.78 m)
- Hair colour: Brown
- Eye colour: Blue

Peta Louise Todd, Lady Cavendish (/ˈpiːtə/ PEE-tə; born 8 December 1986) is an English former glamour model and Page 3 girl.

== Modelling career ==
Todd first appeared on The Sun's Page 3 when she was 18 years old.

== Charity work ==
In 2008, Todd cycled 400 miles (640 km) in five days, raising more than £3,000 through sponsorship and a further £4,000 by auctioning her bicycle and cycling shorts on the last day of her ride, for the Help for Heroes charity. In 2009, Todd climbed Mount Kilimanjaro along with injured servicemen and women to raise funds for Help For Heroes. She is the charity's official pin-up and patron, and she has completed many challenges for Help For Heroes, including skydives, wing walks and bobsleighing; and she completed the 2010 London Marathon in aid of the charity. In 2010, Todd received an award for outstanding contribution to the charity, which included a personal meeting with Prince William.

Todd has also travelled to Afghanistan to boost the morale of the British troops stationed there.

== Media work ==
Todd appeared on the BBC programme Newsnight in 2010 to discuss the merits of 40 years of Page 3. She has taken part in debates at the Oxford Union and at several other universities, including Durham.

Todd has been a regular radio show contributor, co-hosting the Absolution with Tim Shaw show on Absolute Radio and Talksport's The Sports Bar. She has also appeared on BBC Radio 5 Live to discuss whether the 40th anniversary of Page Three should be celebrated.

Todd took part in the 2014 Wales Rally GB as a co-driver for Tony Jardine; they crashed the Mitsubishi Lancer with PlayStation sponsorship which they used for the rally. They later came back into the rally because of the Super rally rule and later completed the rally.

== Personal life ==
She is married to cyclist Mark Cavendish, having met him in November 2010. Cavendish and Todd have four children together, and she also has a son from a previous relationship. Their house in Essex was robbed at knifepoint in November 2021.

Todd is a supporter of West Ham United F.C.

== See also ==
- Lad culture
- List of men's magazines
