= Boxelder Creek (Grand River tributary) =

Stream in South Dakota, U.S.

Coordinates: 45°36′23″N 103°22′13″W

Boxelder Creek is a stream in the U.S. state of South Dakota. It is a tributary of the Grand River.

Boxelder Creek was named for the box elder trees on its course.

== See also ==
- List of rivers of South Dakota
