= Laura Ramsey =

American actress (born 1982)

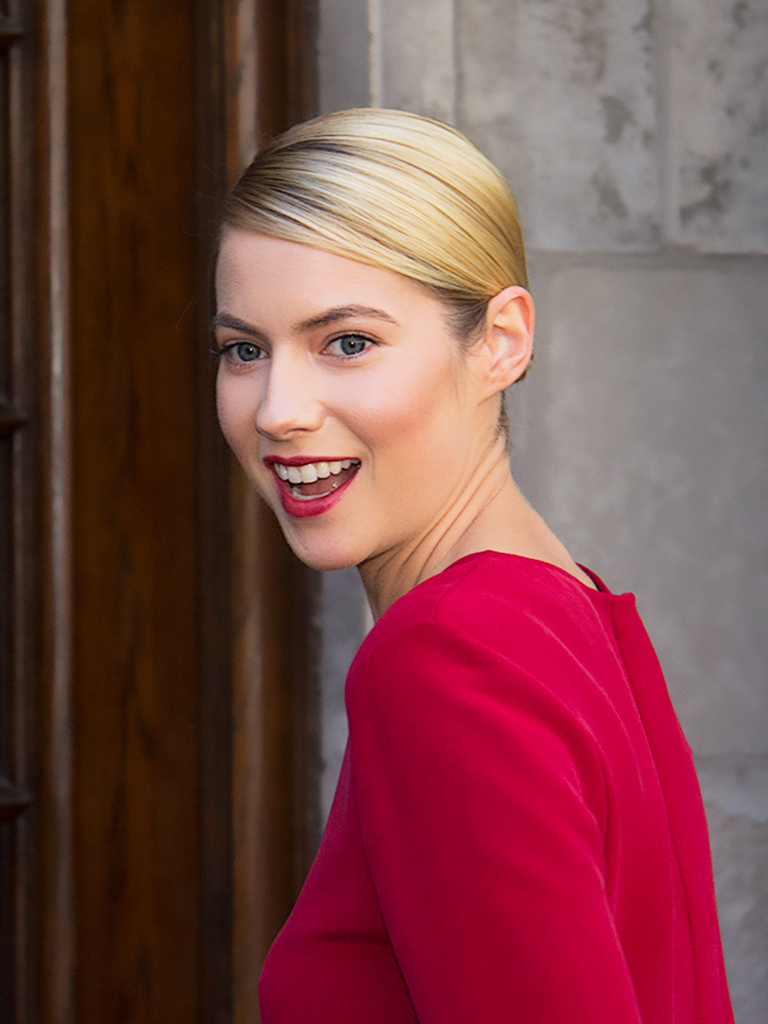
- Ramsey at the 2013 Toronto International Film Festival
- Born: November 14, 1982 (age 43); Brandon, Wisconsin, U.S.
- Occupation: Actress
- Years active: 2003–2015, 2023
- Children: 2

Laura Ramsey (born November 14, 1982) is an American film and television actress. She is best known for her roles in films such as She's the Man and The Covenant (both 2006), The Ruins (2008), Middle Men (2009), Kill the Irishman (2011), and Are You Here (2013).

== Early life and education ==
Ramsey was born on November 14, 1982, in Brandon, Wisconsin, the daughter of Jill and Mark Ramsey. She graduated from Laconia High School in Rosendale, Wisconsin.

== Career ==
Ramsey was approached while working in a restaurant on Sunset Boulevard and received an audition the next day, for a role she won—The Real Cancun, a documentary that revolves around the exploits of several American youths in Mexico. She then began a role in ABC's television series, The Days before making her feature-film acting debut with Catherine Hardwicke's Lords of Dogtown. She returned to television and made an appearance in an episode ("The Jet Set") of the AMC series Mad Men. In 2015, Ramsey starred as Becca Brady on the VH1 scripted series Hindsight. In 2023, after taking an eight-year hiatus from acting, Ramsey starred in Lifetime's television film A Rose for Her Grave: The Randy Roth Story that is loosely based on the book of the same name.

== Personal life ==
Ramsey has a daughter and a son with Greg Chait, a designer with the Elder Statesmen.

== Other ventures ==
In 2022, Ramsey launched her own organic herbal company called Nia's Arc, after completing an apprenticeship in plant medicine.

== Filmography ==
=== Film ===
Year	Title	Role	Notes
2003	The Real Cancun	Herself	
2005	Cruel World	Jenny	
2005	Venom	Rachel	
2005	Lords of Dogtown	Gabrielle	
2006	She's the Man	Olivia Lennox	
2006	The Covenant	Sarah Wenham	
2007	Whatever Lola Wants	Lola	
2008	The Ruins	Stacy	
2009	Middle Men	Audrey Dawn	
2009	Shrink	Kiera	
2010	Somewhere	Naked Blonde with Sailor Cap	
2011	1 Out of 7	Lexi	
2011	Kill the Irishman	Ellie O'Hara	
2011	Where the Road Meets the Sun	Sandra	
2011	Hirokin	Maren	
2012	No One Lives	Betty	
2013	Pulling Strings / Amor a primera visa	Rachel	
2013	Are You Here	Angela	
2013	Awful Nice	Lauren	

=== Television ===
Year	Title	Role	Notes
2004	The Days	Natalie Day	Six Episodes
2008	Mad Men	Joy	One episode
2010	My Generation	Sophie	Two episodes
2013	The Sixth Gun	Becky Montcrief	Pilot
2014	White Collar	Amy	One episode
2015	Hindsight	Rebecca "Becca" Brady	Main role
2023	A Rose for Her Grave: The Randy Roth Story	Cindy	Television film
