= Karen McGrane =

American content strategist and website accessibility advocate

- Born: 4 April 1972
- Education: Rensselaer Polytechnic Institute, University of Minnesota
- Website: https://karenmcgrane.com

Karen McGrane is a content strategist, website accessibility advocate, and author of Content Strategy for Mobile.

McGrane taught Design Management at School of Visual Arts in New York. Her design philosophy is "every company is a technology company" and "every business is in the user experience business." McGrane was an early proponent of designing web content for mobile devices and is a frequent speaker at technology conferences. She was also the co-executive producer, with Jared Spool, of the UX Advantage Conference and cohost of the UX Advantage podcast. She co-hosted the Responsive Web Design podcast from 2014-2018 with Ethan Marcotte.

McGrane has done user experience design work for many major media companies including Condé Nast, Disney, and Citibank; in her position at Razorfish she was the design lead on the New York Times' 2006 redesign. Prior to that she was Vice President and National Lead for User Experience at Razorfish where she was their first information architect hire in 1998. In August 2020 she co-founded the consultancy Autogram with Ethan Marcotte and Jeff Eaton. In April 2025, she and Eaton were acqui-hired by the headless content management platform company Contentful, where McGrane had been an early advisor.

== Content Strategy for Mobile ==
Content Strategy for Mobile was published in 2012 by A Book Apart. It has been called an essential guide for people publishing serial content online, one that has a clear "plan of action." McGrane advocates for "adaptive content," small chunks of content that can appear on different platforms and in different contexts. For this to happen, content needs to have good metadata and exist within a content management system which is itself easy to use. Companies also need to do research into both their audience needs and the approaches of their competition in order to do this effectively. If done correctly, web content will "work everywhere, all the time."

She published her second book, Going Responsive, with A Book Apart in 2015.

== Early life and education ==
McGrane has a BA in American Studies and Philosophy from the University of Minnesota and a Master's degree from Rensselaer Polytechnic Institute in Human Computer interaction.

== Personal life ==
McGrane married the journalist Tim Carmody on November 4, 2022. McGrane and her husband use 26 separate Slack channels to coordinate household tasks such as shopping lists, chores, and dog care.
