= Box Elder Peak (Utah County, Utah) =

Mountain in Utah, United States

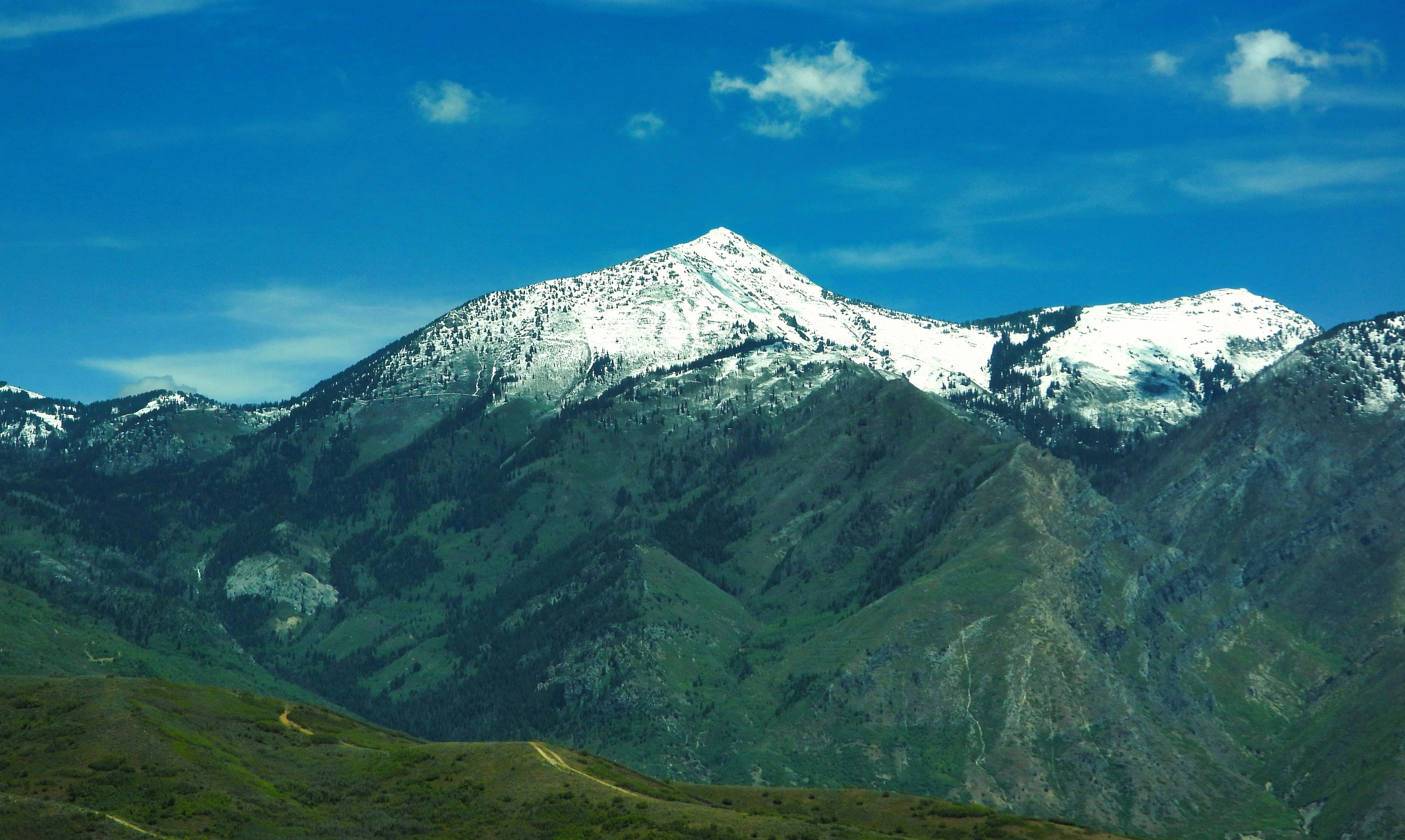
- West aspect in spring

Highest point
- Elevation: 11,101 ft (3,384 m)
- Prominence: 1,641 ft (500 m)
- Parent peak: White Baldy
- Isolation: 3.06 mi (4.92 km)
- Coordinates: 40°29′23″N 111°41′47″W

Naming
- Etymology: Box elder

Geography
- Location within Utah Location within the United States
- Country: United States
- State: Utah
- County: Utah
- Protected area: Lone Peak Wilderness
- Parent range: Wasatch Range; Rocky Mountains
- Topo map: USGS Timpanogos Cave

Geology
- Rock age: Pennsylvanian
- Rock type(s): Limestone, Oquirrh Formation

Climbing
- Easiest route: class 1+ hiking

Box Elder Peak is an 11,101-foot-elevation (3,384-meter) mountain summit located in Utah County, Utah, United States.

== Description ==
Box Elder Peak is located 21 miles (34 km) southeast of downtown Salt Lake City in the Lone Peak Wilderness, on land managed by Wasatch–Cache National Forest. The peak is set in the Wasatch Range which is a subset of the Rocky Mountains. The mountain is composed of limestone, quartzite, and shale. Precipitation runoff from the mountain's east slope drains to American Fork River, whereas the west slope drains to Dry Creek, and both flow to Utah Lake. Topographic relief is significant as the summit rises 4,900 feet (1,494 meters) above American Fork Canyon in 2.5 miles (4 km). An ascent of the summit involves hiking nine miles with 5,400 feet of elevation gain from Dry Creek Canyon. This mountain's toponym has been officially adopted by the United States Board on Geographic Names. There is another Box Elder Peak in the northern Wasatch Range in Box Elder County, Utah.

== Gallery ==
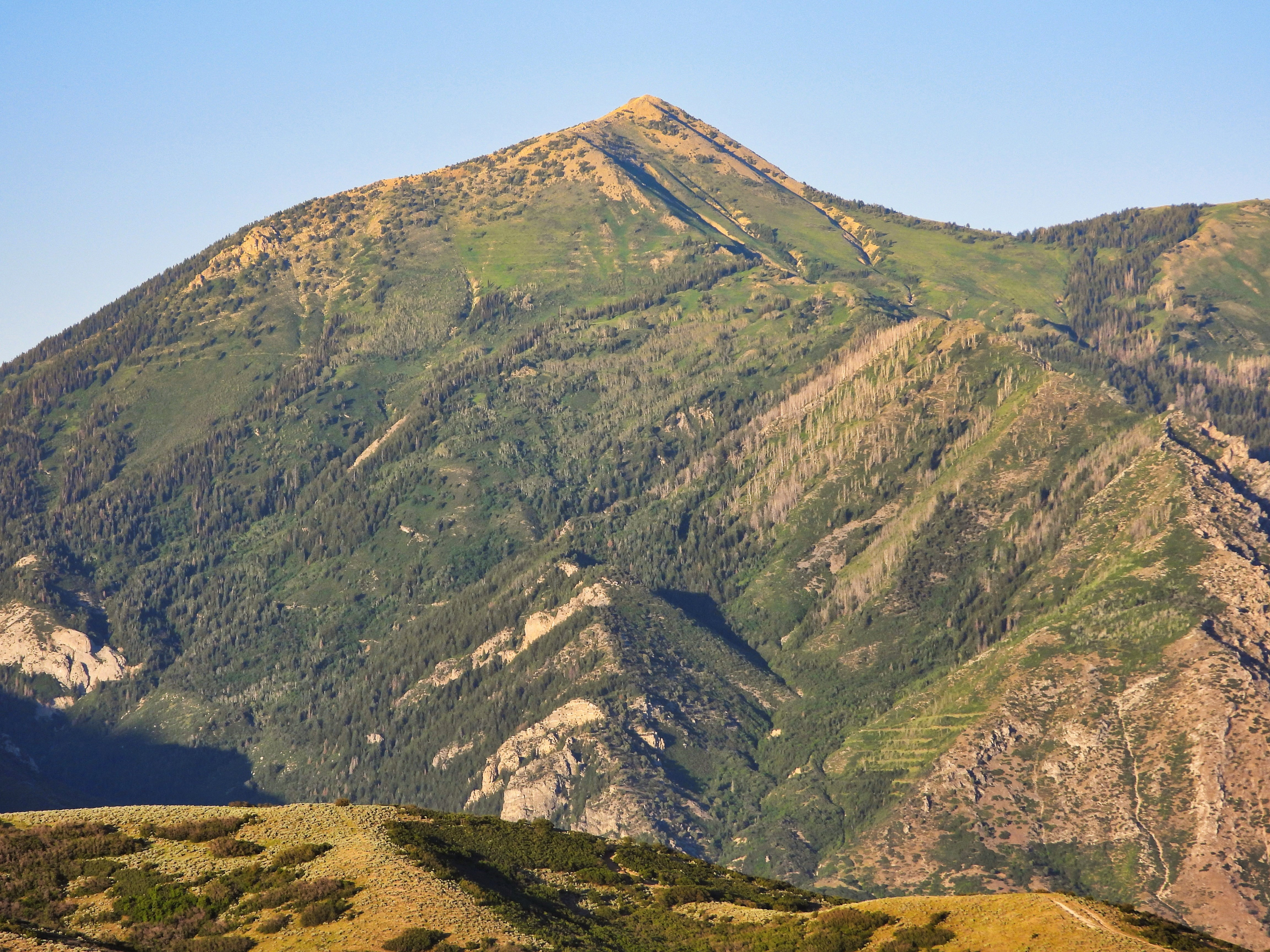
West aspect in summer

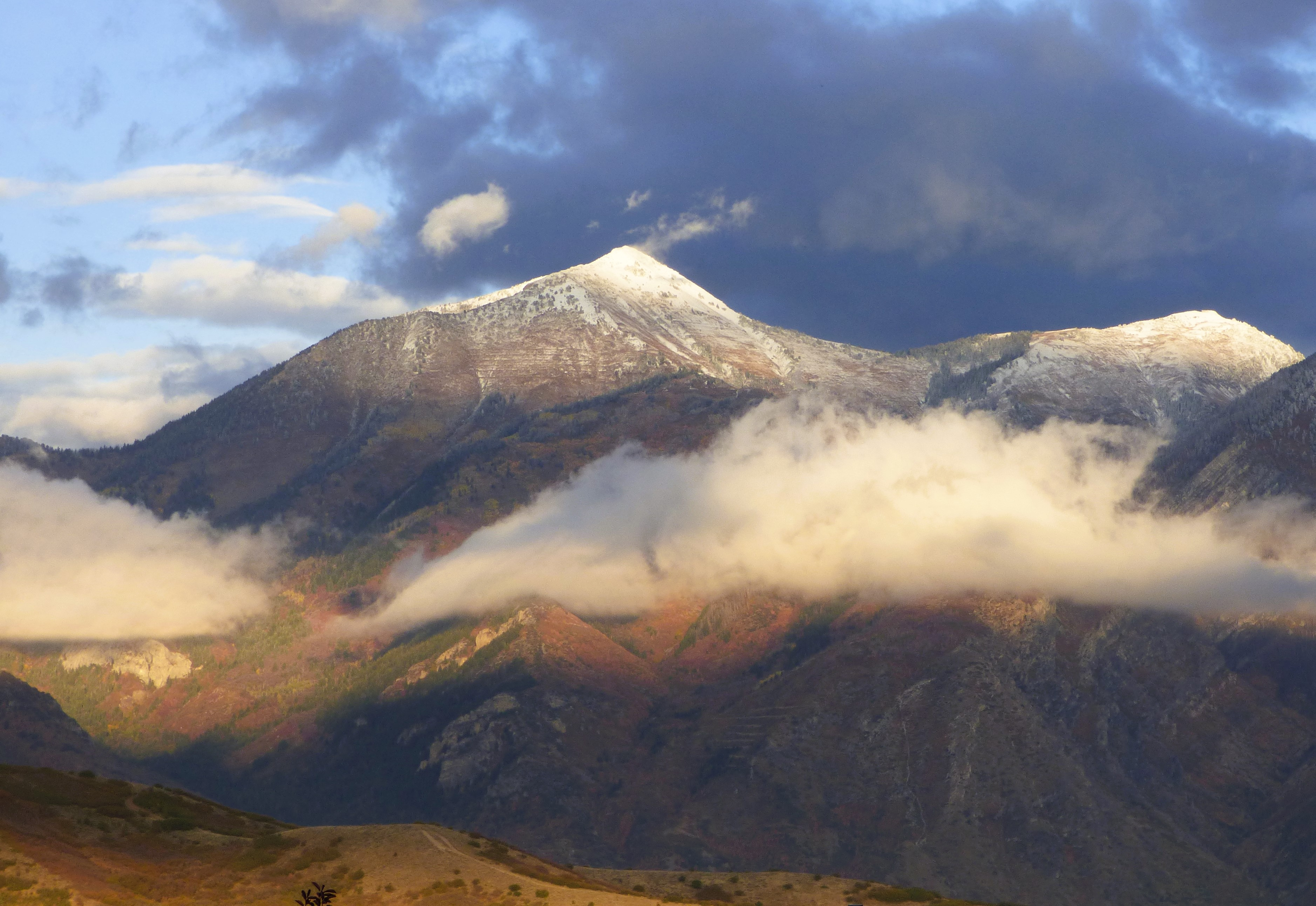
West aspect in autumn

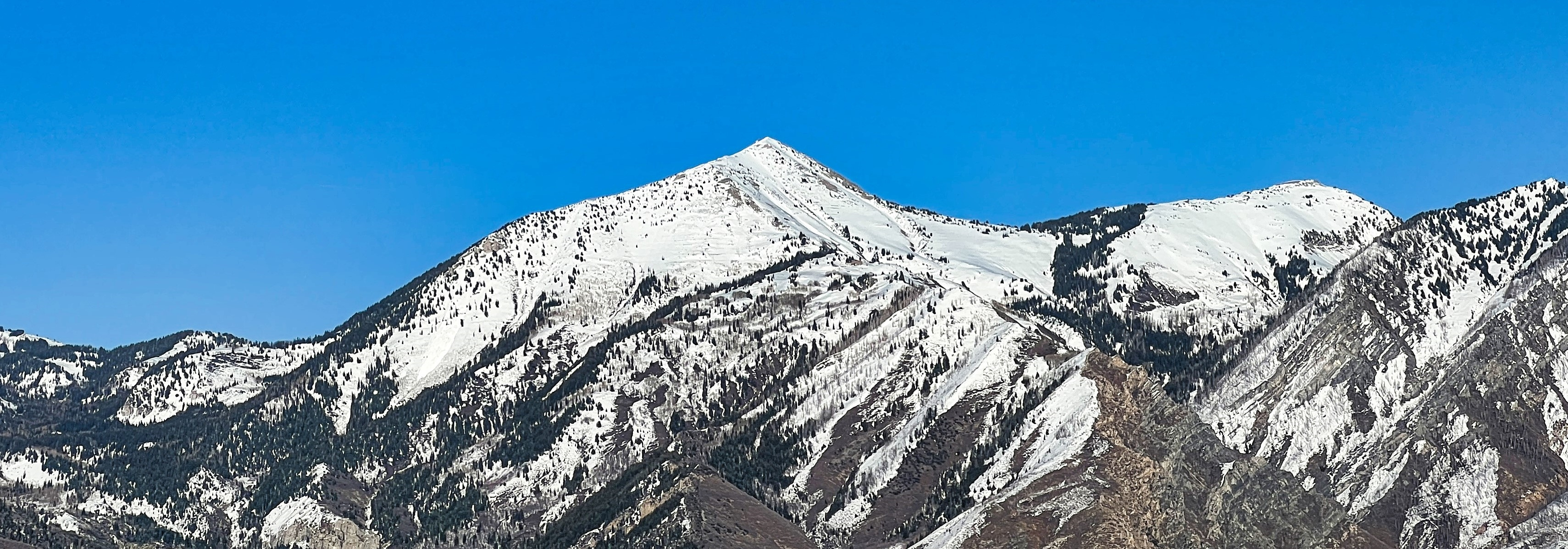
West aspect in winter

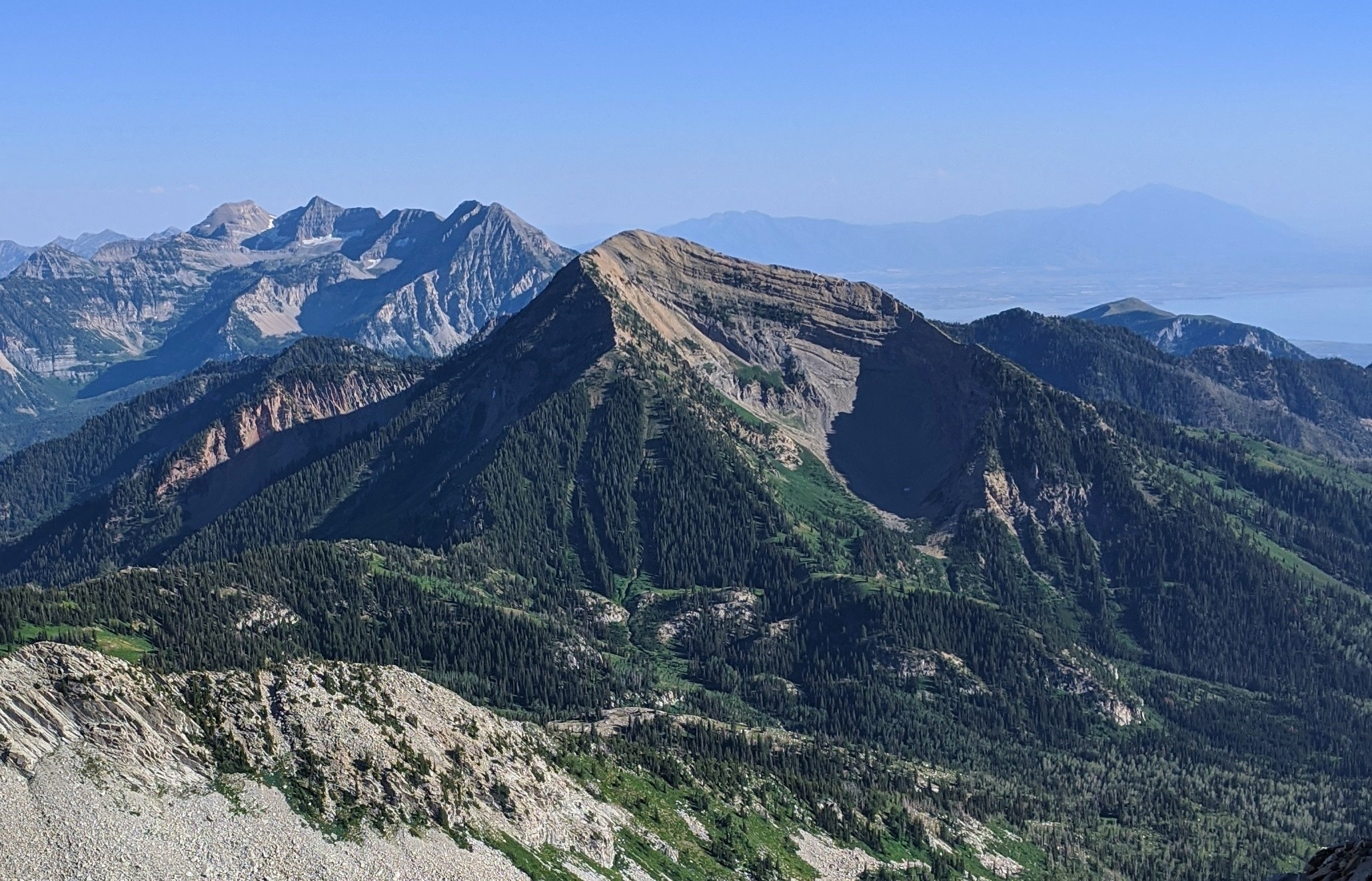
North aspect of Box Elder Peak (centered) viewed from Pfeifferhorn.
(Mount Timpanogos behind, left).

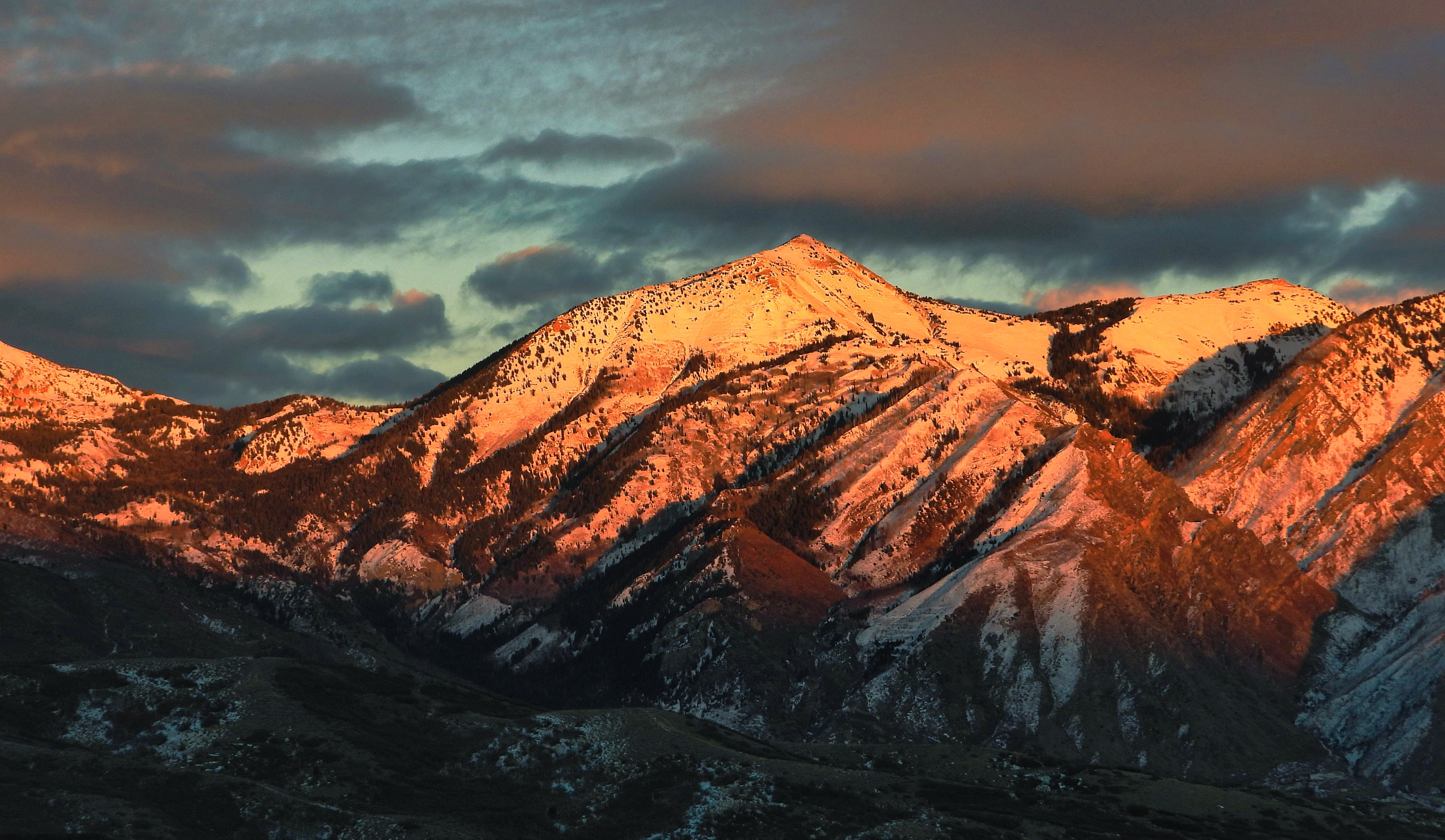
Winter sunset

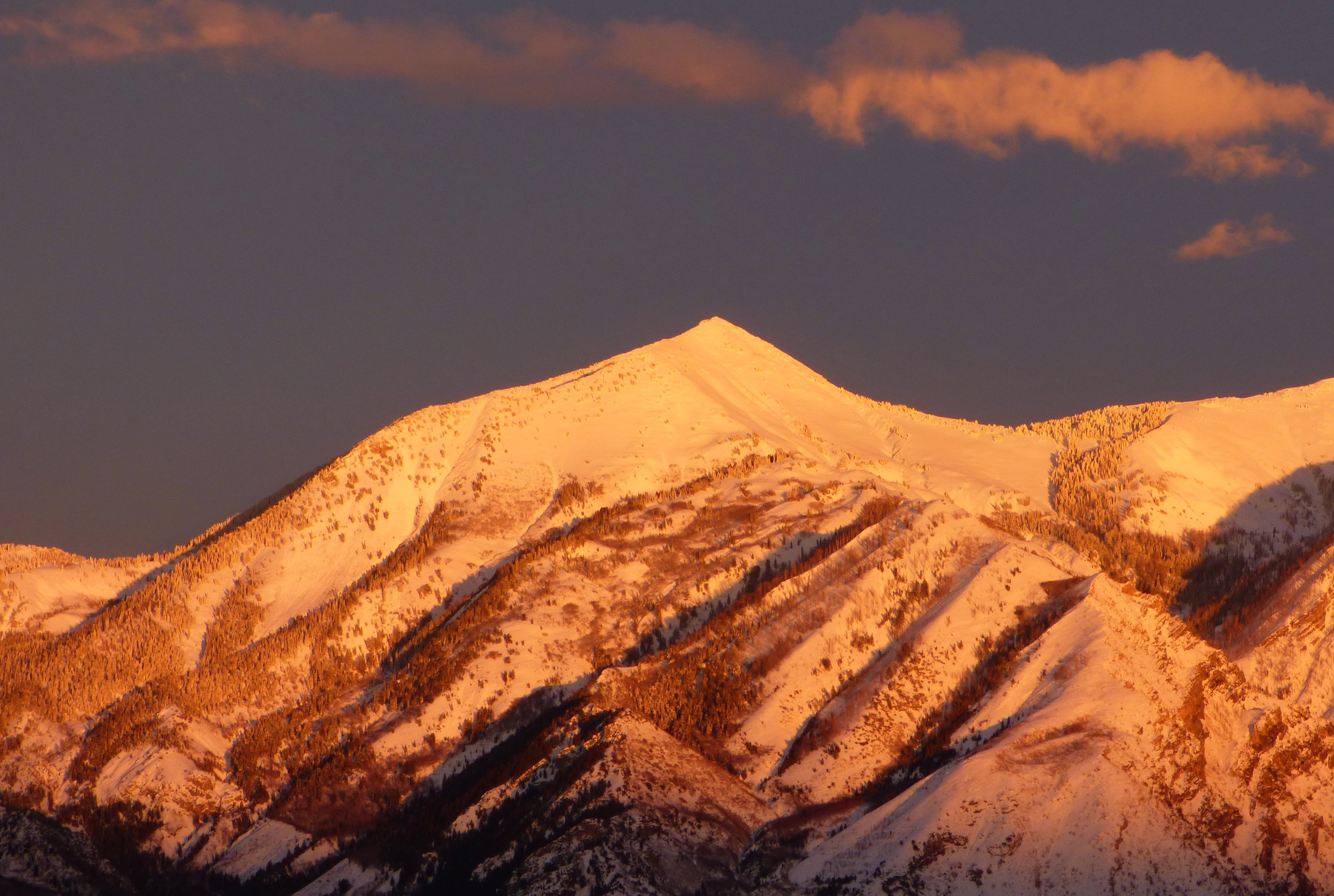
Winter sunset
