= Box Elder (film) =

- A comedy about dudes, bros, and dude-bros.
- Directed by: Todd Sklar
- Written by: Todd Sklar
- Produced by: Todd Sklar; Brock Williams
- Starring: Alex Rennie; Nick Renkoski; Chad Haas; Todd Sklar
- Cinematography: J. Rockwell Seebach
- Edited by: Kamau Bilal
- Distributed by: Range Life Entertainment
- Release date: March 3, 2008
- Running time: 91 minutes
- Country: United States
- Language: English

Box Elder is a 2008 American independent film. It was written and directed by Todd Sklar, his first feature film. The film stars Alex Rennie, Nick Renkoski, Chad Haas, as well as Sklar.

== Plot ==
Box Elder follows best friends and roommates, John Scott (Sklar) Alex, Nick, and Chad (Haas) through their final years of college at the University of Missouri. The loose narrative structure is anchored by John's breakup with his girlfriend Laura (Hina Abdullah). The four dudes party, eat sandwiches, and repeatedly ignore their scholastic responsibilities.

== Cast ==
Actor	Role
Alex Rennie	Rennie
Nicholas Renkoski	Nick Becker
Chad Haas	Bradley Fletcher
Todd Sklar	John Scott
Hina Abdullah	Laura Glaser
James Ponsoldt	Robby "Couv" McGouven
Brian Sturgill	Matt Vaggey
Kyle Ayers	Phil Ryerson

== Distribution ==
In the Spring of 2008, Sklar and a number of cast and crew from the film toured the film from city to city, mostly focusing on college campuses and art-house cinemas. Sklar, via his distribution company, Range Life Entertainment, entered into direct 50-50 revenue-sharing deals with the majority of the theaters at which Box Elder screened. According to the filmmaker at numerous post-screening Q&A sessions, Sklar will be bringing Box Elder, along with a number of other films, back on the road and into theaters in the fall of 2008.

== Critical reception ==
During the film's engagement at the Gene Siskel Film Center in Chicago, Time Out Chicago gave the film 3 stars and said it, "plays like a cross between Richard Linklater’s Slacker and TV’s Seinfeld." The Chicago Reader gave a brief review, praising, "the dialogue has actual wit in addition to the usual ironic gloss and Sklar's vision of college is the fond fiction we all like to remember in adulthood."

== Soundtrack ==
Song	Band
"Roadrunner"	The Modern Lovers
"Get Real"	Hockey Night
"Charm School"	Bishop Allen
"Mazatlan"	The Plastic Constellations
"This Western Lot"	The Plastic Constellations
"I Need You"	The Rationals
"Stand Up (Let's Get Murdered)"	P.O.S
"The Monster Mash"	Bobby Pickett
"Bad Kids"	The Black Lips
"It's Us"	The Plastic Constellations
"Gusto"	Ha Ha Tonka
"Manpark"	Lifter Puller
"Cold Hands"	The Black Lips
"Set You Free"	The Black Keys
"Back to the Lake"	Guided by Voices
"Old World"	The Modern Lovers
