= Richard Desmond =

British publisher and businessman (born 1951)

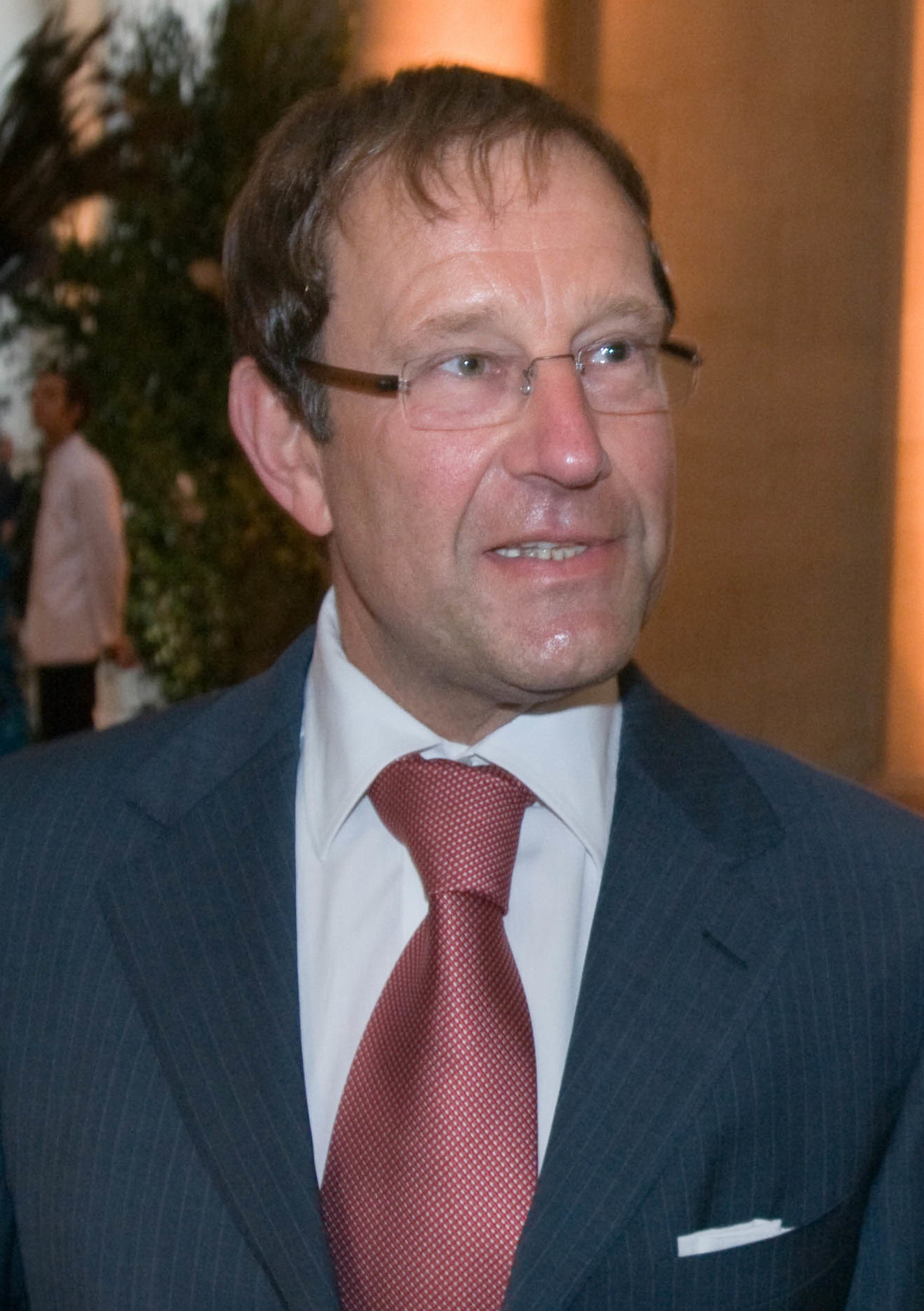
- Desmond in 2010
- Born: Richard Clive Desmond; 8 December 1951 (age 74); Hampstead, London, England
- Occupations: Publisher; businessman; former pornographer
- Television: Television X (1995–2016); Red Hot TV (2000–2016); Channel 5 (2010–2014)
- Spouses: Janet Robertson (m. 1983; div. 2010); Joy Canfield (m. 2012)
- Children: 3
- Website: northernandshell.co.uk

Richard Clive Desmond (born 8 December 1951) is a British ex-publisher, businessman and former pornographer. He is the founder of Northern & Shell, a publisher that started by publishing music magazines in the 1970s, followed by variety of pornographic magazines in the 1980s. In the 1990s, it launched celebrity magazines (including OK! and New!) and Portland TV that produced pornographic television channels. In the early 2000s, the company sold the pornographic magazine titles and purchased the Express Newspapers, followed by Britain's Channel 5 in 2010. It launched The Health Lottery in 2011. Channel 5 was sold in 2014, Portland TV in 2016 and the Express Newspapers in 2018.

In 2020, Desmond was involved in controversy after pressuring Robert Jenrick, the then Secretary of State for Housing, Communities and Local Government, to overrule the Planning Inspectorate and approve a housing development for Desmond's company. The timing of the decision saved the company £40 million but was later overturned.

According to the 2025 Sunday Times Rich List, Desmond was the 122nd richest person in the United Kingdom with a net worth of £1.3 billion.

== Early life ==
Desmond was born in Hampstead, north London, into a Jewish family, the youngest of three children, and was raised in Edgware, in northwest London. His father was descended from Latvian Jews, and his mother was of Ukrainian-Jewish descent. His father, Cyril, was at one time managing director of cinema advertising company Pearl & Dean. An ear infection caused the sudden loss of Cyril's hearing and, according to Richard, he used to take the boy along, when he was no more than three years old, to act as "his ears" in business meetings, where he ostensibly acquired his "first taste of business dealings".

After Cyril lost a significant amount of family money to gambling, his parents divorced, and 11-year-old Desmond moved with his mother, Millie, into a flat above a garage; he has described his impoverished early adolescence as a time when he was "very fat and very lonely". Desmond was educated at Edgware Junior School and Christ's College, Finchley.

Desmond left school at 15 and started working in the classified advertisements section of the Thomson Group, while playing the drums at gigs after a day's work. After moving to another company, he became the advertising manager for the music magazine company Beat Publications, the publisher of Beat Instrumental. Desmond owned two record shops by the time he was 21.

== Publishing career ==
=== Founding of Northern & Shell ===
In the mid-1970s, Desmond combined his interest in music and advertising to found publication company Cover Publication with Ray Hammond. Cover Publication launched International Musician and Recording World, a monthly magazine for musicians which expanded to have editions in the UK, US, Australia, Japan and Germany. This was followed by the publication of Home Organist, whose editor contributed the old-school motto Forti Nihil Difficile ("Nothing is difficult for the strong" – it was Benjamin Disraeli's motto), still used by the Northern & Shell group. Desmond eventually bought out Hammond.

In 1979, impressed by Gulf and Western's use of a name which drew association to a larger company, Desmond decided to change the name of Cover Publication to Northern & Shell, Northern for Northern Rock and Shell for Shell Oil. Desmond was the first investor in the London Docklands, having purchased land for an office space for Northern & Shell for £1 million. Northern & Shell were the first company to move to the area in 1982.

=== OK! Magazine ===
Northern & Shell began publication of the celebrity OK! magazine as a monthly in 1993, later becoming a weekly in March 1996. It is the largest weekly magazine in the world, with 23 separate editions from the US to Australia to Azerbaijan and with a readership in excess of 31 million. It was originally an imitation of Hello! magazine but now outsells its rival.

=== Pornography ===
In 1982, Northern & Shell began to publish the UK edition of Penthouse, although the licensing deal ended in the 1990s. The company soon began to publish a range of pornographic magazines itself including Asian Babes, Readers Wives, Barely Legal, Horny Housewives, Mega Boobs and Posh Wives, numbering 45 such titles in all when they were eventually sold. During the 1980s, Desmond ran a premium rate phone sex company until 1988 when he sold the business after British Telecom raised concerns about the content. In 1994, Desmond ordered 250,000 copies of Penthouse to be pulped after it published a photoshoot featuring lookalikes of Charles, Prince of Wales, Diana, Princess of Wales and Camilla Parker Bowles.

Desmond's Northern & Shell launched The Fantasy Channel in 1995. It was one of the first pornographic channels available on satellite television in the UK, competing against other channels available on cable. The channel was later rebranded as Television X. These channels were regulated by Ofcom and the BBFC. By 2003, Desmond's company had expanded to broadcasting seven channels, with plans to launch six more and the business was described as "extremely lucrative", generating £17m of the £60m operating profits of Northern & Shell. A website, fantasy121.com, was also launched. His rivals in the business were David Sullivan and Paul Raymond.

Desmond put the magazines up for sale in 2001 in an attempt to distance himself from the adult content industry. Desmond sold the pornographic magazine business to Remnant Media for approximately £10 million. He said in 2003 in a television programme, The Real Richard Desmond (Channel 4): "Would it be better to be a former pornographer rather than a pornographer? I'm probably being more honest by keeping them. They serve a need."

Northern & Shell's business interests in pornography ended in April 2016 when Portland Television, established in 1995, the broadcaster of Television X and the Red Hot channels, was sold for under £1 million in a management buyout. Desmond has often been referred to as "Richard 'Dirty' Desmond", or "Dirty Des", in Private Eye magazine due to Northern & Shell formerly owning pornographic magazines and television channels.

Desmond has disputed references to himself as a pornographer. Desmond has emphasised that his material has been available through WHSmith and Freeview, saying that: "If it was pornography you would end up in prison because pornography is illegal". In November 2021, The Guardian reported that Desmond had instructed lawyers to get the term "pornographer" removed from the Wikipedia article about him because, in his opinion, the phrase "only refers to publishers of illegal or obscene material".

=== Alleged involvement with New York mafia ===
According to The Guardian, Desmond had made a deal in 1991 with Norman Chanes for running advertisements in his pornographic magazines for telephone sex lines run by Chanes' mafia associate, Richard Martino of the Gambino crime family. According to the BBC, Martino was "widely reported" to be linked to the mafia, but Desmond did not know. The deal reportedly left the Americans out of pocket and after Desmond refused to pay compensation, his employee was kidnapped and assaulted in New York. Desmond called this account "a fantasy", but encouraged his employee to report the incident to the police and hire a bodyguard to protect himself.

In February 2005, The Guardian reported that the claim Desmond had received death threats from the New York Gambino mafia family was contained in affidavits from FBI agents released during Martino's trial relating to the fraudulent use of the telephone lines. Desmond has denied the whole episode; he asserted there was no evidence he knew about the fraud perpetrated by Martino.

== Express Newspapers ==
In November 2000, Northern & Shell acquired Express Newspapers from United News & Media for £125 million, enlarging the group to include the Daily and Sunday Express titles, the Daily Star and Daily Star Sunday (which Desmond started), and the Irish Daily Star (owned jointly with the Irish Independent News & Media group). In August 2024 the Daily and Sunday Express each sold around 120,000 to 140,000 copies per issue.

After buying Express Newspapers, Desmond became embroiled in a feud with Viscount Rothermere, publisher of the Daily Mail, the rival to the Daily Express, largely derived from stories relating to Rothermere's private life. The Evening Herald reported in 2003 that Desmond was using the Express as a vehicle for his racist views. Once, when asked if he was racist, he commented "No. I just don't trust darkies or poofs". In 2003, an investigation by the Financial Times found that Desmond had registered his business in Jersey to avoid paying millions of pounds in tax in the UK. They also reported that his publishing businesses were not profitable with most of the groups profits coming from pornographic TV channels.

In 2004, Desmond put in a £500m bid for The Daily Telegraph and Sunday Telegraph national newspapers and The Spectator magazine.

In April 2004, the Daily Express reverted to supporting the Conservatives, after a period backing Labour. On the same day, Desmond attacked The Daily Telegraph (with which he was a joint venture partner in the West Ferry newspaper printing plant), then considering accepting a takeover by the German Axel Springer group, and asked if they were keen on being run by Nazis. According to Desmond, in an exchange at the meeting, all Germans are Nazis. Desmond reportedly harangued The Daily Telegraph's chief executive and associates in faux German at a business meeting and imitated Adolf Hitler. Executives from The Telegraph walked out of the meeting. This incident was described as a form of institutionalised racism prevalent among newspaper proprietors. Previously, in August 2001, the National Union of Journalists' chapel at the Express & Star also condemned Desmond for the newspaper's "hysterical and racist" campaign against asylum seekers; this campaign was also criticised by Yasmin Alibhai-Brown, writing for The Independent in June 2002.

In August 2005, the former Daily Express executive editor Ted Young made an out-of-court settlement with Desmond's company ahead of an industrial tribunal. This related to an incident with Desmond in the newsroom in September 2004, during which Desmond was said to have hit the journalist. Desmond has repeatedly denied the claims. In 2008, Northern & Shell reported a turnover of £483.9 million.

=== Libel case ===
Litigation began at the High Court on 6 July 2009 over claims in journalist Tom Bower's joint biography of Conrad Black and Barbara Amiel, Conrad and Lady Black: Dancing on the Edge, that Desmond had made a "humiliating climbdown" over an Express story at the end of 2002 on the state of Lord Black's finances, which it was alleged Desmond had ordered to be written. This claim of a weakening of Desmond's "super-tough" reputation as a businessman was viewed as defamation by Desmond. Bower denied libel on the grounds of the story being "substantially true". The following day, the presiding judge The Hon. Mr Justice Eady, discharged the jury as "fundamental" evidence and legal submissions had emerged. The new jury later found in favour of Bower. A biography of Desmond, titled Rough Trader, was written by Bower and printed in 2006 but never published.

=== News content ===
In 2014 the Financial Times referred to the Desmond-owned Express running "apparently repetitive coverage of immigration, freak weather events and theories about the death of Diana, Princess of Wales." Commenting at the Leveson Inquiry in January 2012, Desmond said: "There has been speculation that Diana was killed by the royal family ... The speculation has gone on and on. I don't know the answer." The Times reported his newspapers had repeatedly published such claims. For its defamatory articles covering the disappearance of Madeleine McCann, which numbered a hundred, the Express paid damages of £550,000 to the toddler's parents in 2008. In his appearance at the Leveson Inquiry, Desmond said the Express had been "scapegoated" by the Press Complaints Commission (PCC), who had "failed to provide us with any guidance" and were thus implicitly responsible for the defamatory articles. According to Desmond, the PCC was a "useless organisation run by people who wanted tea and biscuits and by phone hackers; it was run by people who wanted to destroy us." In 2015, when asked in a BBC interview if he regretted the Express's coverage of McCann's disappearance, he said: "No, I think we reported it very fairly."

== Channel 5 ==
In July 2010, Desmond bought the UK terrestrial-television channel Channel 5, which was losing money, from RTL Group, for £103.5 million.

In the year before Desmond acquired Channel 5, it had made a total loss of €41m (£37m), or a €9m loss at an operating level. Desmond immediately proceeded to cut costs, starting with the dismissal of seven of Channel 5's nine directors, beginning a drive to eliminate "£20m of yearly expenses". The stated plan included the dismissal of up to 80 of the network's 300 employees. Desmond also significantly increased the programming budget. In the first full year of Desmond's ownership, the broadcaster saw a 28% surge in revenue - the biggest TV advertising haul in its 14-year history - "thanks to factors including the arrival of Big Brother and the return of a major media buying contract with Aegis". He sold Channel 5 to Viacom for £463m in May 2014.

== Westferry Printworks ==
In 2016, Northern & Shell submitted plans to build 722 homes on the former Westferry Printworks site. The plans were approved by then London Mayor, Boris Johnson. However, the plans never materialised.

In 2018, a revised planning application was submitted, which sought to build 1,500 homes across five tower blocks. These plans were rejected by the council and Planning Inspectorate but were later approved by then Secretary of State for Housing, Communities, and Government, Robert Jenrick.

In May 2020, Robert Jenrick accepted his approval of the housing development had been unlawful but denied any bias. Following a meeting a Conservative fundraising dinner, Desmond sent Jenrick a text message stating "We don't want to give Marxists loads of doe [sic] for nothing!" referring to money which would be owed to Tower Hamlets Council to pay for infrastructure improvements. Jenrick's approval, which was against the advice of the planning inspector, met a deadline that reportedly would have saved Desmond £40m. The development also proposed just 21% affordable housing compared to the minimum target of 35%, which Tower Hamlets Council estimate would have saved Desmond up to £106m. Desmond, whose company had donated to the Conservative Party in 2017, made a further personal donation to the party shortly after the approval was given. The Conservative Party Chairman subsequently apologised to members of the 1922 Committee for having allowed Desmond to sit next to Jenrick and allowing Desmond to lobby him. The development was later rejected by government.

In 2023, a revised planning application was submitted for a residential led, mixed use development comprising 1,358 new homes, a 1,200 place secondary school, with ground floor commercial and amenity space. The development would deliver over 5 acres of public open space and 35% of the development is set to be affordable housing. In August 2024, the local planning authority passed a resolution to grant planning consent and a formal decision notice was issued in February 2025.

== Net worth ==
By December 2010, Desmond's privately owned publishing venture employed more than 2,000 people internationally, according to Desmond. In 2010, Desmond was ranked the equal-57th richest man in Britain by The Sunday Times Rich List, with a net worth of £950 million. In 2014, he was ranked 78th and worth £1.2 billion. In 2016, Forbes estimated his fortune at close to $1.49 billion, while the 2016 Sunday Times Rich List reported his net worth at £2.25 billion. According to the Sunday Times Rich List in 2019, Desmond has a net worth of £2.6 billion, falling to £2 billion in 2020. Express Newspapers was sold to Reach plc (formerly Trinity Mirror) in 2018 for £200 million, of which £74 million was invested in the Express newspapers pension scheme until 2027.

== Political activity ==
In 2000, Desmond donated £100,000 to the Labour Party. Two years later, in a BBC Newsnight interview with Jeremy Paxman, Tony Blair was asked if it was appropriate to accept the donation due to Desmond's links with the pornography industry, to which Blair replied "if someone is fit and proper to own one of the major national newspaper groups in the country then there is no reason why we would not accept donations from them".

In December 2014, during the run-up to the 2015 United Kingdom general election, Desmond was reported to have agreed to donate £300,000 to the UK Independence Party. There was speculation at the time that a further donation could follow. In April 2015, it was announced that he had given an additional £1 million to the party.

== Lotteries ==
In October 2011, Desmond's company Northern and Shell launched the Health Lottery, of which around 20% of turnover goes to charity. The grants, distributed by the People's Health Trust (PHT), help many good causes and the elderly in local communities across the UK. It supports local health causes throughout England, Scotland and Wales. The Health Lottery was to return 20.34p per £1 lottery ticket to good causes, which was compared unfavourably with the National Lottery donating 28p per £1 ticket. Sir Stephen Bubb, then chief executive of the Association of Chief Executives of Voluntary Organisations, accused Desmond of "profiteering on the back of charities". In July 2020, it was announced that the proceeds given to charity was to increase to 25%.

In November 2019, Desmond announced his intention to bid for the National Lottery licence when it came up for renewal at the end of the year. In 2021, Northern & Shell submitted their bid but the contract was awarded to Allwyn Entertainment in March 2022. Northern & Shell challenged the Gambling Commission in the courts over its handling of the lottery award process. The Gambling Commission offered to settle the case for £10 million in December 2024 and the case reached the High Court in October 2025, with Desmond claiming £1.3 billion in damages. In April 2026, the High Court dismissed Desmond's claim, with Mrs Justice Smith's judgement noting “inexcusable” failings by Desmond's legal team. Northern & Shell noted that they would appeal the ruling.

== Personal life ==
Desmond and Janet Robertson were married for 27 years; the couple have a son, Robert. In October 2010, Janet divorced him and Desmond subsequently married Joy Canfield, a former manager for British Airways, in 2012. Joy was pregnant with Desmond's child when Janet divorced him. The couple have two children; daughter Angel Millie (born 2011) and a son, Valentine (born 2015). Since 2024 he has split his time between London and Dubai.

Desmond's autobiography, The Real Deal: The Autobiography of Britain's Most Controversial Media Mogul, was published in June 2015 by Random House. It was ghost-written by Sunday Express editor Martin Townsend. He also provided his voice for the audiobook version. The autobiography received a five-star review in the Desmond-owned Daily Express.

=== Charity work ===
In 2003, Desmond and Roger Daltrey formed the RD Crusaders, a rock group featuring Desmond on drums, to raise money for charitable causes.

Desmond became president of the UK Jewish charity Norwood in 2006. He also donated £2.5m to the £15m children's centre at Moorfields Eye Hospital and his name was attached to it.
