= Big Society =

British socio-political concept in the 2010s

The Big Society was a sociopolitical concept of the first 15 years of the 21st century, developed by the populist Steve Hilton, that sought to integrate free market economics with a conservative paternalist conception of the social contract that was influenced by the 1990s civic conservatism of David Willetts. The Big Society influenced the 2010 UK Conservative Party general election manifesto and the legislative programme of the Conservative–Liberal Democrat coalition agreement. The relevant policy areas were devolved in Northern Ireland, in Scotland and in Wales, to, respectively, the Northern Ireland Executive, the Scottish Government and the Welsh Government.

British PM David Cameron, and subsequent British Governments, declined to publicly use the term "Big Society" after 2013. The Big Society Network was dissolved in 2014 and the unfavourable conclusive Big Society audit, by Civil Exchange, was published in January 2015.

== Launch ==
Following the election of a Conservative–Liberal Democrat coalition government at the 2010 general election, the new Conservative Prime Minister David Cameron launched the initiative in July with a speech at Liverpool Hope University accompanied by screenwriter and television producer Phil Redmond. The stated priorities were:

1. Give communities more powers (localism and devolution)
2. Encourage people to take an active role in their communities (volunteerism)
3. Transfer power from central to local government
4. Support co-ops, mutuals, charities and social enterprises
5. Publish government data (open/transparent government)

The plans included setting up a Big Society Bank and a Big Society Network to fund projects, and introducing a National Citizen Service. The Lord Wei, one of the founders of the Teach First charity, was appointed by Cameron to advise the government on the Big Society programme. He carried out the role until May 2011 when Shaun Bailey and Charlotte Leslie were moved into the Cabinet Office to work on the project.

Four initial "vanguard areas" were selected:

- Liverpool (withdrew from pilot in February 2011)
- Eden, Cumbria
- Sutton, Greater London
- Windsor and Maidenhead, Berkshire.

== Initiatives ==
- The Big Society Network was set up in 2010 in order "to generate, develop and showcase new ideas to help people to come together in their neighbourhoods to do good things." It was owned by a charity called The Society Network Foundation. During its first four years of existence the Big Society Network was funded with approximately £2 million of National Lottery funding and public-sector grants. In July 2014, a National Audit Office report criticised the way that money was allocated to and used by the network and The Independent newspaper claimed that and the Charity Commission had begun an investigation into alleged misuse of funds by the network. In 2014 the Big Society Network was put into administration owing money to the government and an application was made to the Charity Commission to have the organisation wound up.
- Big Society Capital, the Big Society Bank, was launched in 2011. Major UK banks agreed to provide £200 million in funding for the organisation in addition to money made available from dormant bank accounts under the Dormant Bank and Building Society Accounts Act 2008. The UK government's intention was to unlock £78bn in charitable assets for big society. To create a demand for the funds, it was announced that up to 25% of public service contracts were to be transferred to private and voluntary sector.
- The Big Society Awards were set up in November 2010 to recognise community work done in the UK that demonstrates the Big Society. Over fifty awards had been presented by the start of 2015.
- The National Citizen Service is a voluntary personal and social development programme for 16- and 17-year-olds in England. It was piloted in 2011 and by 2013 there were 30,000 young people taking part.
- The Localism Act 2011 contained a section on community empowerment. New rights were created for charitable trusts, voluntary bodies and others to apply to councils to carry out services provided by the council. In addition, lists of Assets of Community Value were compiled. These were assets such as shops, pubs and playing fields, which were privately owned, but which were of value to the community. If such an asset was later sold, the Act made it easier for the community to bid for and take over the asset.
- Free schools (otherwise known as charter schools) were introduced by the Academies Act 2010 making it possible for parents, teachers, charities and businesses to set up and run their own schools. Between 2010 and 2015 more than 400 free schools were approved for opening in England, representing more than 230,000 school places across the country.

== Response ==
=== Initial press reaction ===
In March 2010, The Daily Telegraph wrote: "We demand vision from our would-be leaders, and here is one who offers a big one, of a society rebuilt from the ground up". In April 2010 The Times described the Big Society as "an impressive attempt to reframe the role of government and unleash entrepreneurial spirit". Later in the same year, The Spectator said that "Cameron hoped to lessen financial shortfalls by raiding dormant bank accounts. It's a brilliant idea in theory". Cameron defended the policy against criticism by other commentators.

=== Questions concerning originality ===
Two days after the initiative's launch in Liverpool, an article in Liverpool Daily Post argued that community organisations in the city such as Bradbury Fields show that Cameron's ideas are already in action and are nothing new, and that groups of community-based volunteers have for many years provided "a better service than would be achieved through the public sector".

Simon Parker, Director of the New Local Government Network, argued that although "there is little in the coalition government's agenda that is entirely novel, what is new is the scale of change required." Ben Rogers, in an opinion piece published in the Financial Times, suggested that "the most interesting thing about [Cameron's] speech [to the Conservative Party Conference] were its sections on the 'Big Society'", and that "Most of the political problems Mr Cameron faces, from cutting crime to reducing obesity, can only be met if residents and citizens play their part". However, Rogers went on to state that "the state has so far invested very little in teaching the skills that could help people make a contribution", highlighting what he perceived to be a fundamental flaw in the programme. Cameron responded that the policy's lack of novelty does not detract from its usefulness and that it should be judged on its results.

=== Small state criticism ===
The implementation of the policy coincided with large-scale cuts in public expenditure programs which were implemented to address macroeconomic concerns. In 2010 Cameron indicated that such cuts were temporary and to be enacted purely from economic necessity. However, in 2013 he said that he had no intention of resuming spending once the structural deficit had been eliminated, since his aim was to create a "leaner, more efficient state". This led critics to conclude that the Big Society was intended primarily as a mechanism for reducing the size of the state. Labour's leader Ed Miliband said that the Conservatives were "cynically attempting to dignify its cuts agenda, by dressing up the withdrawal of support with the language of reinvigorating civic society" and suggested that the Big Society is a "cloak for the small state".

Of the political weeklies, the New Statesman said "Cameron's hope that the Big Society will replace Big Government is reminiscent of the old Marxist belief that the state will 'wither away' as a result of victorious socialism. We all know how that turned out. Cameron has a long way to go to convince us that his vision is any less utopian". Also referring to Marx, political cartoonist Steve Bell in The Guardian on 21 January 2011 and The Guardian Weekly newspaper on 28 January 2011 adapted Marx's slogan "From each according to his ability, to each according to his need" for the Big Society: "From each according to their vulnerability, to each according to their greed".

Lorie Charlesworth, an academic from the Institute of Advanced Legal Studies, compared the system to the Old Poor Law, and suggested that "any voluntary system for the relief of poverty is purely mythical".

Anna Coote, head of Social Policy at the independent think-tank NEF, wrote in July 2010 that "If the state is pruned so drastically ... the effect will be a more troubled and diminished society, not a bigger one". In November 2010 a report by NEF suggested that "There are strong, sensible ideas at the heart of the 'Big Society' vision... [but] for all its potential, the 'Big Society' raises a lot of questions, which become more urgent and worrying in the light of public spending cuts".

TUC general secretary Brendan Barber concluded that "the logic of this is that [Cameron's] ideal society is Somalia where the state barely exists". Cameron's response was that the Big Society ideology pre-dated the implementation of cuts to public services, that the reduction in the size of the state had become inevitable, and that Big Society projects are worthwhile whatever the state of the economy.

=== Concerns over implementation ===
The Daily Telegraph's Ed West predicted in 2010 that "The Big Society can never take off", placing the blame on the socialist ideology held by some of the British public. Also writing for The Daily Telegraph, Mary Riddell said "the sink or swim society is upon us, and woe betide the poor, the frail, the old, the sick and the dependent" whilst Gerald Warner felt that "of all the Blairesque chimeras pursued by David Cameron, none has more the resonance of a political epitaph than 'Big Society'". Sir Stephen Bubb, Chief Executive of ACEVO, welcomed the idea of the Big Society but claimed that Cameron was "undermining" it. His concerns were about cuts in government money going to charities coming "too far and too fast". He later said the project had become a "wreck". Steven Kettell of the University of Warwick has written of the intrinsic "problems surrounding the government's call to put religious groups at the centre of the Big Society agenda".

In April 2012, criticisms were raised concerning the shortage of Big Society policies across Government, such as the lack of employee-owned mutuals and social enterprises in public sector reforms as well as the introduction of a cap on tax relief for charitable giving in the 2012 Budget. A report published in May 2012 suggested that the £3.3 billion cuts in government funding to the voluntary sector between 2012 and 2015 had greatly reduced the capacity of voluntary groups to implement Big Society projects. Bernard Collier expressed concern that the policy's lack of localism was "favouring big charities" and ignoring the "potential contribution of local voluntary and community organisations".

In 2014, former Cameron aide Danny Kruger said that although the relevant legislation had been put in place, the policy had been downgraded from its original role due to a lack of leadership. At the same time, a Centre for Social Justice report suggested that the policy was having least effect in the poorest in the country where it would be most useful. Cameron responded that the public sector had already failed to prevent the poorest parts of the country becoming so, and that there were examples of the Big Society having been effective in poor areas.

=== Decline ===
During the course of the 2010–15 government, the Big Society declined as an instrument of government policy. Cameron did not use the term in public after 2013 and the phrase ceased to be used in government statements. The collapse of the Big Society Network in 2014 and criticism of the Prime Minister's relationship with it were followed by a critical final Big Society Audit published by Civil Exchange in January 2015. The audit highlighted cuts in charity grants and restrictions on the right to challenge government policy through the courts as undermining Big Society ideals. It noted that charities have had a decreasing role as government contractors due to policies which favoured the private sector and it pointed out that the centralisation of the British political system has not significantly decreased, with no noticeable upsurge in volunteering and social action concentrated in the wealthiest places. The Cabinet Office responded that the Civil Exchange report did not fairly reflect "the significant progress made". In response to a parliamentary question claiming that the Big Society had failed, the Government said that "cynics" were "entirely wrong" and that "some of the changes we have introduced are irreversible".

Shortly before the 2015 election, Cameron proposed a law that would give some employees the right to three days of paid annual leave to do voluntary work. The proposal appeared in the Party's manifesto, along with a guarantee of a place on the National Citizen Service for all children and an increase the use of social impact bonds. However, the Big Society did not form a significant part of the Conservative Party's election strategy, being replaced instead by an emphasis on economic stability and border controls.

== See also ==
- Edmund Burke
- Community politics
- Coproduction
- Muscular liberalism
- Third Way
- United Kingdom government austerity programme
- Welfare capitalism
