= International Musician =

International Musician may refer to:

- International Musician, the journal of the American Federation of Musicians
- International Musician and Recording World, a UK magazine published from 1975 to 1991.
