= The Gold Club =

Former strip club in Atlanta, Georgia

The Gold Club was a strip club in Buckhead, a district of Atlanta, Georgia, that operated from 1987 until 2001, the same year the owner pleaded guilty to racketeering charges.

== Operations ==
The Gold Club was one of the most prominent strip clubs in Atlanta. It was located on Lindbergh Road.

Owner Steve Kaplan was the subject of a 14 week trial in 2001 after prosecutors alleged that the club was used for prostitution, money laundering, bribery and credit card fraud. Kaplan was also accused of having links to the Gambino crime family.

The club was managed by Thomas "Ziggy" Sicignano, who acted as a witness for the prosecution. Steven Sadow represented Kaplan during the case, which was brought under the Racketeer Influenced and Corrupt Organizations Act. As part of a plea deal during the trial, Kaplan confessed to racketeering. Judge Willis Hunt sentenced Kaplan to sixteen months in prison. Details of the plea deal included agreeing to close the club, 400 hours of community service, and a $5 million fine.

The club was the subject of the 2001 Court TV program Sex, Sports & the Mob: Atlanta's Gold Club, written and directed by Steven Dupler. After the club's 2001 closure, Atlanta City Council agreed to attempt to purchase the location, although it was next used as a church before opening as The Gold Room nightclub in 2009.

== See also ==
- List of strip clubs
