= International Musician and Recording World =

Defunct magazine in production from 1974 to 1991

- Categories: Music and technology
- Frequency: Monthly
- Founder: Ray Hammond; Richard Desmond; Malcolm Green
- Founded: 1975
- First issue: March 1975; 51 years ago
- Final issue: December 1991; 34 years ago
- Based in: United Kingdom; United States; Europe; Australia; Japan
- Language: English

International Musician and Recording World was a magazine published from 1975 to 1991. Originally launched in the UK, editions were created for the United States, Europe, Australia, and Japan.

== Foundation ==
International Musician and Recording World was created by Ray Hammond, Richard Desmond, and Malcolm Green. The title was published by Cover Publications Ltd, which the trio incorporated in London in 1974. Desmond and Hammond had previously worked together at Beat Instrumental, while Green was a former managing director at HH Electronic and joint proprietor of White Rabbit Records with Desmond. Cover Publications would later become Northern & Shell.

== Expansion ==
The first issue of International Musician and Recording World was published in the UK in March 1975, with the team working out of Bayham Street in Camden, London, later moving to Drury Lane in around 1978. An American edition launched later that year, with Julius and Gary Graifman acting as General Manager and Editor, respectively, in the New York office. Steven Dupler would later take over as editor-in-chief of the US edition in the 1980s.

The German edition was launched in 1979, with Wolfgang Bongertz—formerly of Spotlight magazine—acting as Editor-in-Chief. After initially starting production in Frankfurt, the German team was moved to the Drury Lane office within a few months. After the German edition was discontinued, members of staff would go on to set up Soundcheck magazine.

== Content ==
International Musician and Recording World contained interviews with well-known recording artists, such as George Harrison, George Benson, Jaco Pastorius, and Frank Zappa. It also featured advice on recording techniques and reviews of musical equipment. Content was shared between the editions, with the German team translating an interview with Kraftwerk for the English edition, for instance.

== Editors ==
The editors for International Musician and Recording World included Ray Hammond, Jeff Pike, Tony Horkins, Tony Reed and Matt Wallis.
