= Front (magazine) =

1998–2017 British men's magazine

- May 2010 cover featuring Jessica Weekly and Emily D
- Categories: Men's magazines
- Frequency: Monthly
- Circulation: 30,009 (ABC Jan–Jul 2012)
- Publisher: Pocketmags.com
- First issue: 1998
- Final issue: 2017
- Country: United Kingdom
- Language: English
- Website: frontmag.co.uk

Front was a British men's magazine. First published by Cabal Communications in 1998, it was created to rival IPC's publication Loaded, catering to a demographic of 16-to 25-year-old males. It began as part of the British "lads' mag" genre of magazines, though the covers rejected this description with the statement "Front is no lads' mag".

Whilst a major selling point was the photo-shoots of models, the magazine also focused heavily on music, films, gadgets and games, plus sections on fashion and sport. Glamour shoots within the magazine usually involved well-known models rather than celebrities.

The magazine had also been responsible for a number of high-profile stunts, most notably smuggling an Eric Cantona lookalike, Karl Power, into the Manchester United team photo during a Champions League game.

== History ==
On 7 February 2014, Front magazine announced on its Facebook page that it had ceased operations and the magazine would no longer be published. The next month, on 18 March 2014, the magazine announced they would be returning by writing "And FRONT said onto her, I am the resurrection, and the life; he that believeth in me, though FRONT were dead, yet shall FRONT live!"

Front magazine was relaunched in 2016. The new editions held true to the tongue in cheek humour of the original issues. The focus in content shifted slightly to issues including homelessness, UK opiate abuse and the refugee crisis, while also still featuring high-profile models, movies and style. Music also remained at the forefront of Front's content, with interviews with The Offspring and Big Narstie filed in 2016.

The revitalized Front also featured a major focus on MMA and other action sports, building a hard core fanbase from its 2 million social media followers. However, this relaunch was short-lived; the magazine ceased publication after its 198th issue in 2017.

== Owners ==
- Cabal Communications (1998–2003)
- Highbury House (2003–2006)
- SMD Publishing (2006–2007)
- Flip Media (2007–2008)
- Sports Media Group (2008–2009)
- The Kane Corporation (2009 – closure in 2014)
- Live Love Publishing (2014–2015)

== Notable cover models ==
- Jo Guest, August 1999 and May 2002
- Sassy Pandez, October 1999
- Katie Price, January 2001, July 2003, September 2003 and March 2004
- Pamela Anderson, July 2001 and August 2002
- Christina Aguilera, October 2001
- Nell McAndrew, February 2002
- Jenna Jameson, January 2005
- Melanie Sykes, March 2005
- Jodie Marsh, December 2005
- Lucy Pinder, January 2006
- Raven Riley, March 2007
- Iga Wyrwał, March 2008

== See also ==
- Ralph
- FHM
- Maxim
- Hotdog
- Page 3
- Glamour photography
- Chris (Simpsons artist)
