= Remnant Media =

UK magazine publisher

Remnant Media was a British publisher of magazines, especially pornographic magazines. Remnant Media published Asian Babes, Readers Wives, Horny Housewives, Mega Boobs, Mothers-in-Law, Big Ones, Just 18, and 60 Plus. Remnant Media also published the gay lifestyle magazine Attitude until January 2007.

== History ==
Remnant Media was established by Simon Robinson in March 2004 when Richard Desmond's company Northern and Shell sold a package of 45 titles, for about £20m, to Remnant Media in order to help reshape Desmond's image as part of his strategy to bid for The Daily Telegraph. The Bank of Scotland became embroiled in controversy by lending Remnant Media £5 million towards the financing package.

In December 2005, Remnant Media created an offshoot publishing company SMD Publishing which was dissolved in July 2010. Publications under SMD included Hotdog and Front.

== Liquidation ==
Remnant Media entered administration in late 2007. The assets of the company were soon sold to Trojan Publishing, itself soon acquired by Interactive Publishing. Trojan went into liquidation from 2010 and was dissolved by May 2013.

== See also ==
- Core Magazine
