= Hotdog (magazine) =

Film magazine

- Managing Editor: Richard Olsen
- Categories: Film magazine
- Circulation: 7,000 (as of 2006)
- Publisher: SMD Publishing
- Founded: 2000
- Final issue: 2006
- Company: Remnant Media
- Country: United Kingdom
- Based in: London
- Language: English
- ISSN: 1470-9260

Hotdog Magazine was a film magazine first published in the United Kingdom in 2000. Its publisher, Highbury Entertainment, claimed an average circulation of 17,132 between July and December 2003. By December 2005 sales were down to 13,659, and by its last edition they were thought to have fallen to just 7,000.

As it tended toward a cynical view of the film industry (especially Hollywood), Hotdog could have been regarded as an editorially partisan publication. It usually avoided jumping on the blockbuster bandwagon and frequently published pieces which appeared to be contrary to widespread opinion (such as an iconoclastic item on Star Wars, for instance).

However, over the past couple of years the magazine veered more towards the mainstream film press, with the notable change being its cover policy: initially Hotdog covers were often illustrations or images of cult, historical or alternative characters from film, referenced within that issue in one way or another, but towards the end of its life - along with a new, glossy cover material - this changed to the more standard practice of putting the current star of the moment there instead. This was largely a decision imposed by management for commercial reasons; veiled (or not so veiled) references to the magazine staff's displeasure at the practice can be found in several issues.

== History ==
The magazine was originally published by I Feel Good Ltd, before being sold to Paragon Publishing in 2002. Paragon was bought by Highbury House Communications PLC in 2003, becoming first Highbury-Paragon and later Highbury Entertainment. Following Highbury House's financial collapse in 2005, the Highbury Entertainment magazines were sold off to various other companies, including Future Publishing and Imagine Publishing. Hotdog was sold to SMD Publishing in early 2006, who closed the magazine in November 2006.

Media Week reported that SMD Publishing were to close the title unless a buyer could be found. Richard Olsen, managing editor, said, "Hotdog is an exceptional magazine, but not economically viable in its current form".

In August 2009 Marketing Week announced that Hotdog Magazine had been acquired along with Front magazine by The Kane Corporation, an independent publishing company led by 24-year-old self made millionaire entrepreneur Dominic McVey and managing director of talent agency Money, Francis Ridley. No plans for Hotdog have been announced by The Kane Corporation, however on 7 February 2014 McVey announced his intention to close Front.

== Subscribers ==
Due to the rapid way in which the magazine closed and the circumstances of the staff, subscribers were not offered compensation by way of a transference or refund, without independently contacting Dovetail, the contracted subscription company.
