= Primetime (TV channel) =

Pay-per-view TV channel

- Broadcast area: United Kingdom; Ireland

Programming
- Picture format: 576i (16:9 SDTV)

Ownership
- Owner: Portland TV (Northern & Shell)

History
- Launched: 17 October 2009
- Closed: 21 December 2013

Links
- Website: www.primetimeboxing.co.uk

Availability (at time of closure)

Streaming media
- Primetime: Watch live

Primetime was a pay-per-view TV channel which broadcasts to the United Kingdom and Ireland. The channel was available on Sky channel 498 and through Virgin Media's On Demand service. Primetime also offered live streams via their website.

== History ==
=== Super Six World Boxing Classic ===
Primetime was launched in 2009 with the Super Six World Boxing Classic. The first fight broadcast was a double bill of Arthur Abraham vs. Jermain Taylor and Carl Froch vs Andre Dirrell live from the Trent FM Arena in Nottingham on 17 October 2009. A few viewers experienced technical difficulties on this first event and as such there were some customer complaints. Primetime went on to show all of the group stage one and group stage two events from the Super Six World Boxing Classic including Froch vs Kessler on 24 April 2010. This fight was nearly cancelled due to the Icelandic ash cloud.

=== Klitschko brothers ===
Through 2012 Primetime broadcast fights from both Klitschko brothers including Wladimir Klitschko vs Eddie Chambers on 20 March 2010 and Vitali Klitschko vs. Shannon Briggs on 16 October 2010.

=== Golden Boy Promotions ===
On 16 April 2011, Primetime broadcast Amir Khan vs. Paul McCloskey. This began a relationship with Golden Boy Promotions and lead to the channel showing Amir Khan vs. Zab Judah and Floyd Mayweather Jr. vs. Victor Ortiz.

=== Other promotion deals ===
Towards the end of 2011 Primetime also started working with Top Rank showing Manny Pacquiao vs Juan Manuel Márquez for their third battle. Primetime continued their relationship with Top Rank by showing the Manny Pacquiao vs Timothy Bradley on 9 June 2012. Primetime broadcast the comeback fight of Ricky Hatton on 24 November 2012, providing the UK broadcast as well as providing the world feed of the event. Primetime previously broadcast live Polish Ekstraklasa football matches in a deal with Sports Tonight Live.

=== Closure ===
Primetime closed on 21 December 2013, just 4 days before Christmas Day. Its license was transferred to the American religious broadcaster SonLife.

== See also ==
- Sky Box Office
- The Big Fight Live
- BoxNation
