= Sports Tonight =

Sports Tonight may refer to:

- Sports Tonight (American TV program)
- Sports Tonight (Australian TV program)
- Sports Tonight (Irish TV programme)
- Sports Tonight Live, a British television show and channel
