= Yellow cab (disambiguation) =

Yellow cab is a common name for taxicab companies.

Yellow cab may also refer to:

== Brands and enterprises ==
- Yellow Cab Company, a taxicab company in Chicago
- Yellow Cab Pizza Co., a pizza chain
- Yellow cab, TUIfly's callsign, replaced in December 2013

== Other uses ==
- Yellow cab (stereotype), an ethnic stereotype of Japanese women

== See also ==
- The Yellow Cab Man (1950), an American movie starring Red Skelton
