= Pinkerton syndrome =

Perceived tendency for Asian people to be prejudiced towards White people

Pinkerton syndrome is a term for the perceived tendency of some Asians to regard white people as superior or more desirable, especially for marriage or relationships.

== Etymology ==
Pinkerton syndrome is derived from the 1904 opera Madama Butterfly by Giacomo Puccini, based on the 1898 short story Madame Butterfly by John Luther Long. The term "Pinkerton" is in reference to the character of United States Navy Lieutenant B. F. Pinkerton, an upper class white Anglo-Saxon Protestant, who marries a Japanese girl for convenience while docked in Nagasaki, but plans to abandon her as soon as he leaves Japan and to find a suitably upper class white American wife. Lt. Pinkerton's young Japanese wife, and initially her family, are very excited about her marriage to an American man. However, when she later finds out that Pinkerton has indeed abandoned her and remarried a white American woman, she commits seppuku.

== Empirical evidence ==
Empirical evidence for the Pinkerton syndrome was first examined in Singapore. After a cursory search of Singapore's online media, it was argued that the Pinkerton syndrome is not restricted to interpersonal attraction. As such, the Pinkerton syndrome was redefined broadly "as the tendency for Asians to be prejudiced and to discriminate in favor of white people". In a simulated hiring decision task, Singaporean Chinese participants rated a white job applicant as more suitable for the job and recommended them a higher salary than an equally qualified Chinese applicant. The study provided the first and only empirical evidence of the Pinkerton syndrome in Singapore.

== See also ==
- Amejo
- Sarong party girl
- Yellow cab (stereotype)
