= The RD Crusaders =

British rock supergroup

The RD Crusaders is a supergroup band created by Roger Daltrey of the Who and newspaper publisher Richard Desmond in 2003. The group has raised several million in funds for charities including Teenage Cancer Trust and Norwood.

Their lineup varies but originally consisted of vocalists Roger Daltrey and Lulu, guitarist Russ Ballard (of Argent), bassist Rick Wills (of Foreigner and Bad Company), drummer Steve Smith, organist Zoot Money, and Richard Desmond.

== Activities ==
The supergroup made their 2003 debut at a charity gig to benefit Teenage Cancer Trust at Ronnie Scott's Jazz Club in London. Band members and guests at that show included Roger Daltrey, Gary Moore, Greg Lake, Gary Brooker, Simon Townshend, Nick Newall, Sam Brown, Zoot Money and Richard Desmond. In 2010 the group was in talks to play a charity show in Hollywood, CA.

In 2006 the group held a concert and auction in Old Billingsgate Market which raised funds for the Evelina Children's Hospital Appeal. The lineup featured Richard Desmond, Roger Daltrey, Robert Plant, Elkie Brooks, Lulu, Greg Lake, Russ Ballard, Zoot Money, Simon Townshend, Steve Smith, Nick Newall, Nikki Lamborn (lead singer of Never The Bride), Steve Balsamo and Margot Buchanan. In 2008, they returned to said venue, this time raising funds for the Marie Curie Cancer Hospital. The show was attended by celebrities such as Elizabeth Hurley, Sarah, Duchess of York, Tania Bryer, and Trinny Woodall, among others.

In April 2010, Daltrey, Ballard and Desmond launched The RD Crusaders' WorkHub center for the Norwood charity, which offers support into work for people with learning disabilities.
