= Raven Riley =

American pornographic film actress

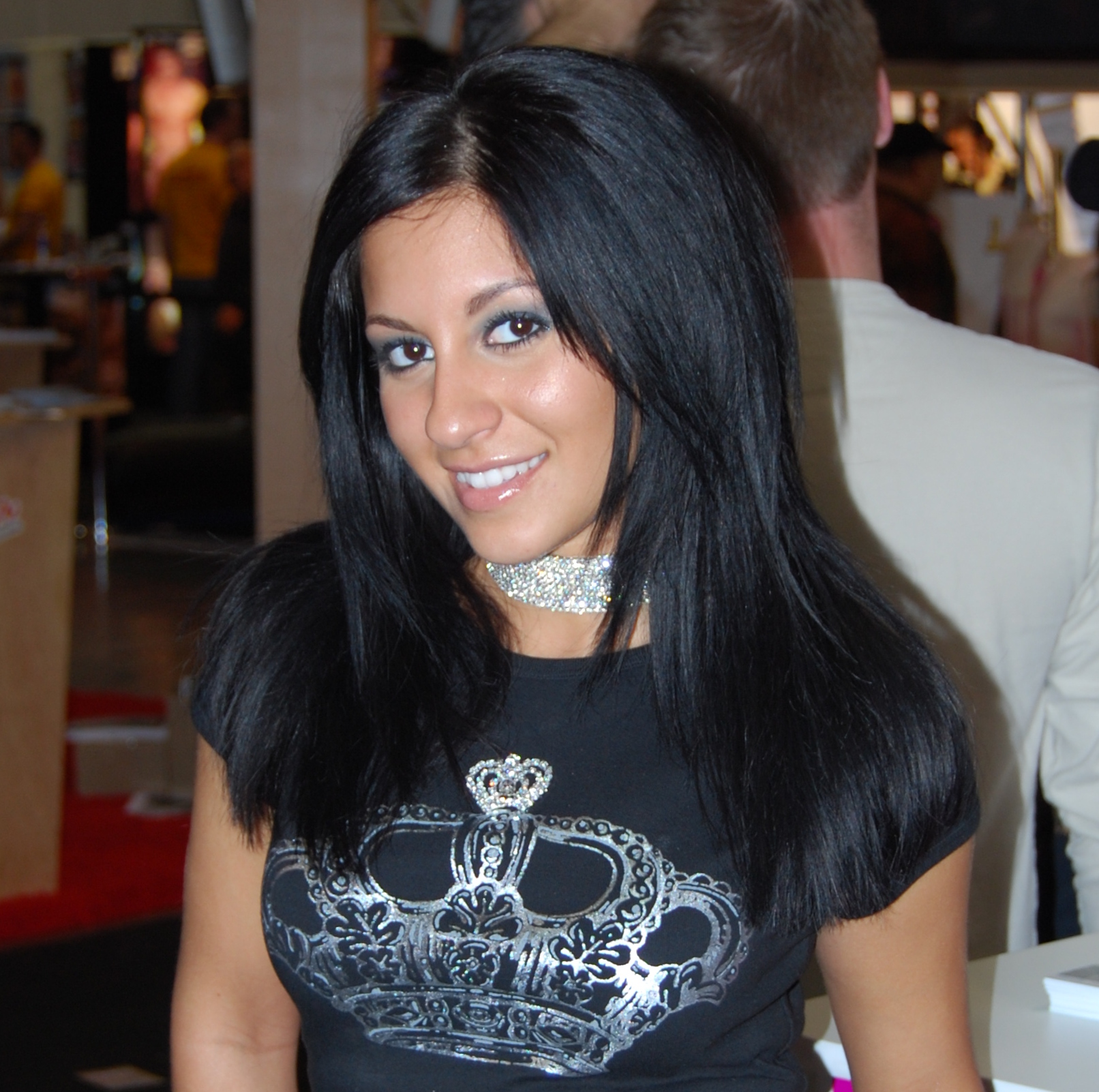
- Riley in 2008
- Occupation: Pornographic film actress

Raven Riley is an American former pornographic film actress, appearing online and on DVDs. Riley won the top spot on Front magazine's "Top 20 Girls of the Web" and appeared on its March 2007 cover.

== Career ==
Riley started modeling in 2004 after first accompanying a friend to a bikini model shoot. She met Jay Man, who was a content producer, and he shot her for amateurfacials.com. Jay Man, his business partner, and Riley started a company called Third Pentacle which launched her solo website in December 2004. Riley, with partners from Jay Man Cash and Third Pentacle, started Evil Motion Pictures, whose goal was to break into mainstream horror film production. Evil Motion Pictures released its first horror porn film starring Riley in November 2007, which was entitled Succubus.

In May 2008, Thomas Leach, by then the owner of jaYManCash, announced that the rumors that Riley was leaving the adult industry were true, saying "while no official documents have been signed, Raven has communicated that the adult industry is no longer in her future and she was going to leave the adult industry." Riley contacted XBIZ and disputed the rumors and reports: "I am still here and I'm not retired... That was false information that was given." As a result of a lawsuit, Leach took full ownership of Third Pentacle. This dispute also affected their relationship with Interactive Life Forms, the company that makes Fleshlight. Leach sued both Riley and ILF, alleging trademark infringement for continuing to use Riley's name in selling their Fleshlight. Leach settled with ILF in 2010.

== Online scam ==
Raven Riley's photos have been used by online scammers to defraud men looking for sexual encounters through social networking sites since at least 2007.
