= Asian Babes =

British pornographic magazine

- Front cover from a 2002 issue
- Former editors: Richard Desmond
- Categories: Softcore pornography
- Founded: 1992
- Final issue: c. 2012
- Company: Remnant Media
- Country: United Kingdom
- Language: English
- ISSN: 1367-7284
- OCLC: 498515623

Asian Babes was a British pornographic magazine which featured softcore photographs of women of South Asian, Korean, Chinese, Japanese, Vietnamese, Filipino, and Thai origin. The magazine was launched in March 1992 and initially used only Indian and other South Asian models from the United Kingdom. Later, Asian models from other countries were also included. The magazine was initially published by Northern & Shell, a newspaper and magazine publishing group owned by the businessman Richard Desmond. In 2004 Northern & Shell sold the magazine to Remnant Media, as part of a package of Northern & Shell's other pornographic titles. Remnant went into administration in 2007 and the magazine was then bought by Trojan Publishing and subsequently by Interactive Publishing. Asian Babes had ceased publication by 2012.

== History ==
In 1983, Northern & Shell obtained the licence to publish Penthouse in the United Kingdom which led to its development of a portfolio of adult titles, with Asian Babes being among them. It was one of the first British pornographic magazines to feature Asian models, and was initially published on an experimental basis. It was, however, an immediate success, with sales of 160,000 copies. The company was also responsible for the release of Electric Blue softcore pornography videos titled Asian Babes in 1993. According to a 1995 survey by the magazine, most of its readers were white men.

Asian Babes, along with other titles such as Readers' Wives, was part of Desmond's portfolio of soft-porn magazines which was offered for sale in 2001. There were concerns that some investors were reluctant to invest in pornography, and that the market for such magazines was changing. Asian Babes was finally sold in 2004 as part of a package of 45 titles to Remnant Media for a reported £20 million (approximately US$39 million). After the magazine had been sold, the Bank of Scotland issued an apology for having loaned £5 million (US$9.8 million) to Remnant Media in order to facilitate the purchase. Remnant Media went into administration in 2007 and the title was bought by Trojan Publishing and subsequently Interactive Publishing. The magazine had ceased publication by 2012.

== Controversy ==
The publication of Asian Babes caused controversy in the British Asian community. Models came into conflict with their families and boycotts were organised against newsagents selling the magazine.

Desmond's ownership of a company that published pornographic magazines was often criticised and frequently used to bolster criticism of his business practices. Yasmin Alibhai-Brown, a columnist for The Independent newspaper in London, England, characterised Desmond as "the seedy porn baron who gives this nation Mega Boobs and Asian Babes and other yuck and muck". The column criticised the way in which Desmond had made use of the Daily Express; Alibhai-Brown's column was not focused on Desmond's publishing activities with regard to pornography. She went on to say: "Actually, I am less bothered about the porn mags than many.... I made myself look at Asian Babes and it is true that the 'babes' themselves look exceedingly full of life, not pushed into any of the poses".

Information about Desmond's ownership of the company that published Asian Babes and other adult magazines was included in a BBC Online 2004 profile which described the controversy surrounding his ownership of a "top-shelf" (pornographic) magazine business at the same time he was attempting to purchase The Daily Telegraph.

== See also ==
- Asian fetish
- Asian Fever – US adult magazine
- Ethnic pornography
- List of pornographic magazines
- Outline of British pornography
- Pornography in the United Kingdom
