= Norwood (charity) =

UK charity

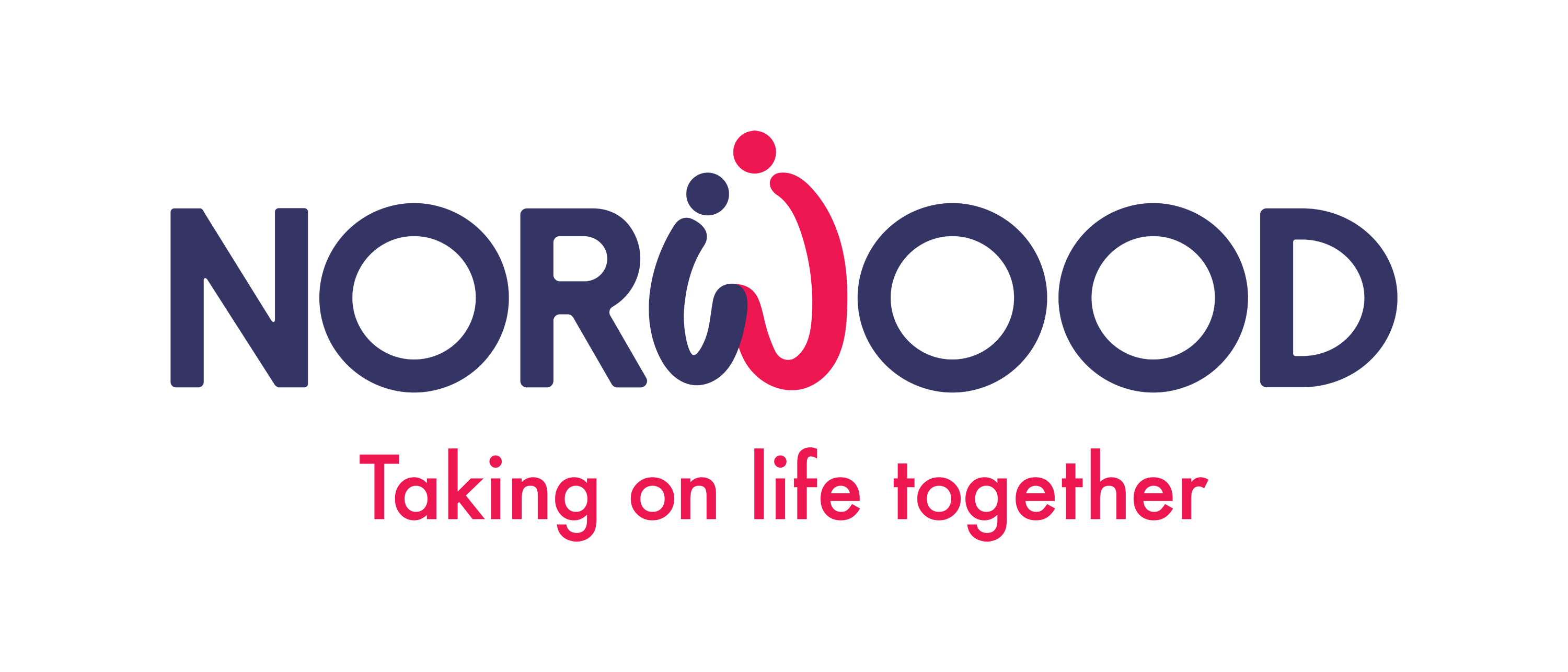
- Formation: 1795
- Type: charity
- Location: Stanmore, London
- Region served: United Kingdom
- Key people: Naomi Dickson, Chief Executive
- Website: norwood.org.uk

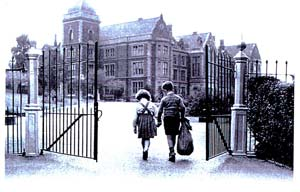
Early origins of Norwood as a boarding school

Norwood, known legally as Norwood-Ravenswood, is a United Kingdom charity established in 1785 in the East End of London. Its name comes from its long-running home for Jewish children, Norwood Hall, in the south London suburb of West Norwood which opened in 1863 and closed in 1961.

In 1996, it merged with Ravenswood, a Berkshire-based charity for people with learning disabilities, to create one of the largest welfare organisations within the British Jewish community.

Norwood provides services supporting vulnerable children, families and people with learning disabilities, within the Jewish and wider communities in London and the South East.

Norwood has been patronized by members of the royal family, beginning with Prince Augustus Frederick, Duke of Sussex, in 1815, and continuing through King Charles III today. Its Patron of Children's Services is Cherie Blair.

== History ==
In 1795, brothers Abraham and Benjamin Goldsmid began campaigning for funds for a major Jewish poor relief scheme. Twelve years later they were able to use the funds to establish the Jews' Hospital in Mile End. Following the death of the Goldsmid brothers, Queen Victoria's uncle, Prince Augustus Frederick, Duke of Sussex, became the Hospital's first royal patron in 1815.

In 1831, the Jews' Orphan Asylum was established in Leman Street. Originally, seven children were housed at the Asylum, but by 1860 it housed 60 orphans. During the same period, the Jews' Hospital was becoming overcrowded, with 100 boys and 40 girls enrolled by 1860. In 1866, the children were transferred from the Jews' Hospital to new premises at Norwood, South London. In 1876, the Jews' Hospital had merged with the Orphan Asylum, and the children from the latter also moved to Norwood. The numbers of Jewish children at Norwood increased from 159 in 1877 to 260 in 1888, and because of the increased demand, many had to be turned away.

The institution was renamed the Norwood Jewish Orphanage in 1928. During this period, it became known to a wider audience due to a high-profile annual day trip to Southend organised by the London Taxi Drivers' Fund for Underprivileged Children.

During World War II, the children were evacuated to homes in Worthing and Hertford and the building was used by the London Fire Brigade as a training centre. After the war, the number of children at the Orphanage started to decline as they became more integrated within the community.

In 1956, the name was again changed to the Norwood Home for Jewish Children.

Ravenswood was established in 1953 in Berkshire by a group calling themselves the Jewish Association of Parents of Backward Children. Its initial mission was to provide care and education for four 11-year-old boys. After the acquisition of a second home and a farm five years later, the Ravenswood Foundation was formed.

In the latter half of the 1950s, nine family houses were built or acquired by Norwood in South London with the aim of giving children a homelike environment. The old Orphanage became redundant and was demolished in 1963. The Norwood family homes were moved to North London and closed one by one, with the last one closed in 1992.

In 1985, Norwood opened its first registered residential home for adults with learning disabilities. Five years later, the Kennedy Leigh Children and Family Centre in Hendon was opened, offering advice and support to families living with learning disability or facing social disadvantage. The centre also housed Binoh, Norwood's education and therapy service that supports children with special educational needs.

In 1996, Norwood merged with Ravenswood, and opened family centres in Redbridge and Hackney. It was called Norwood Ravenswood for six years before finally changing its name to Norwood in 2002.

In January 2008, Cherie Blair opened Wellbeing at Bearsted, a centre offering health and wellbeing services to the local Orthodox community in Hackney. In June 2008, the Hope Charity, a London-based organisation supporting children with special educational needs, joined Norwood's child and family services. Norwood also opened a nursery in Hendon in September 2008, accommodating children who have disabilities or require additional support, as well as providing a facility for children who have no special needs.

In 2008 and 2009, two new specialised facilities were completed at Ravenswood. In 2020, the charity withdrew its application for planning permission to upgrade accommodation in the village because its development partner, Persimmon plc, pulled out of the project.

The Tager Centre is a home for adults who have a range of autism spectrum conditions, while the Pamela Barnett Centre houses adults with profound and multiple learning disabilities.

In March 2009, Norwood joined forces with Brighton care home, Sussex Tikvah. In April 2010, The RD Crusaders WorkHub in Stanmore was opened. The facility offers services to help adults with learning disabilities learn new skills and, potentially, find paid employment.

In 2011, the organisation lost £4 million in local authority funding because of financial cuts.

== Services ==
=== Child and family services ===
Norwood has three family centres in Hackney, Hendon and Redbridge, which provide a range of support services to children and families in the local community.

Wellbeing at Bearsted in Hackney offers health services to the local Orthodox community.

The Hope Centre supports children with special educational needs, using a range of techniques including the Reuven Feuerstein methodology.

Binoh, a special education and therapy service, works with children under 18 with specific educational needs.

Buckets & Spades Lodge is a short break service for children with learning and physical disabilities.

Unity is a recreational play and youth service for children with disabilities. Unity runs holiday schemes at Norwood's family centres in Hendon and Redbridge, as well as after-school clubs and residential holidays.

Family Support includes a social work team and provides multidisciplinary support to families with social or domestic problems, including divorce, abuse, parenting, disability and illness, addiction and finances.

The charity also provides domestic adoption and inter-country adoption services. In 2001, the charity was the successful bidder to run the National Adoption Register. In 2004 this was criticised for lack of successful placements for adoption.

=== Adult learning disability services ===
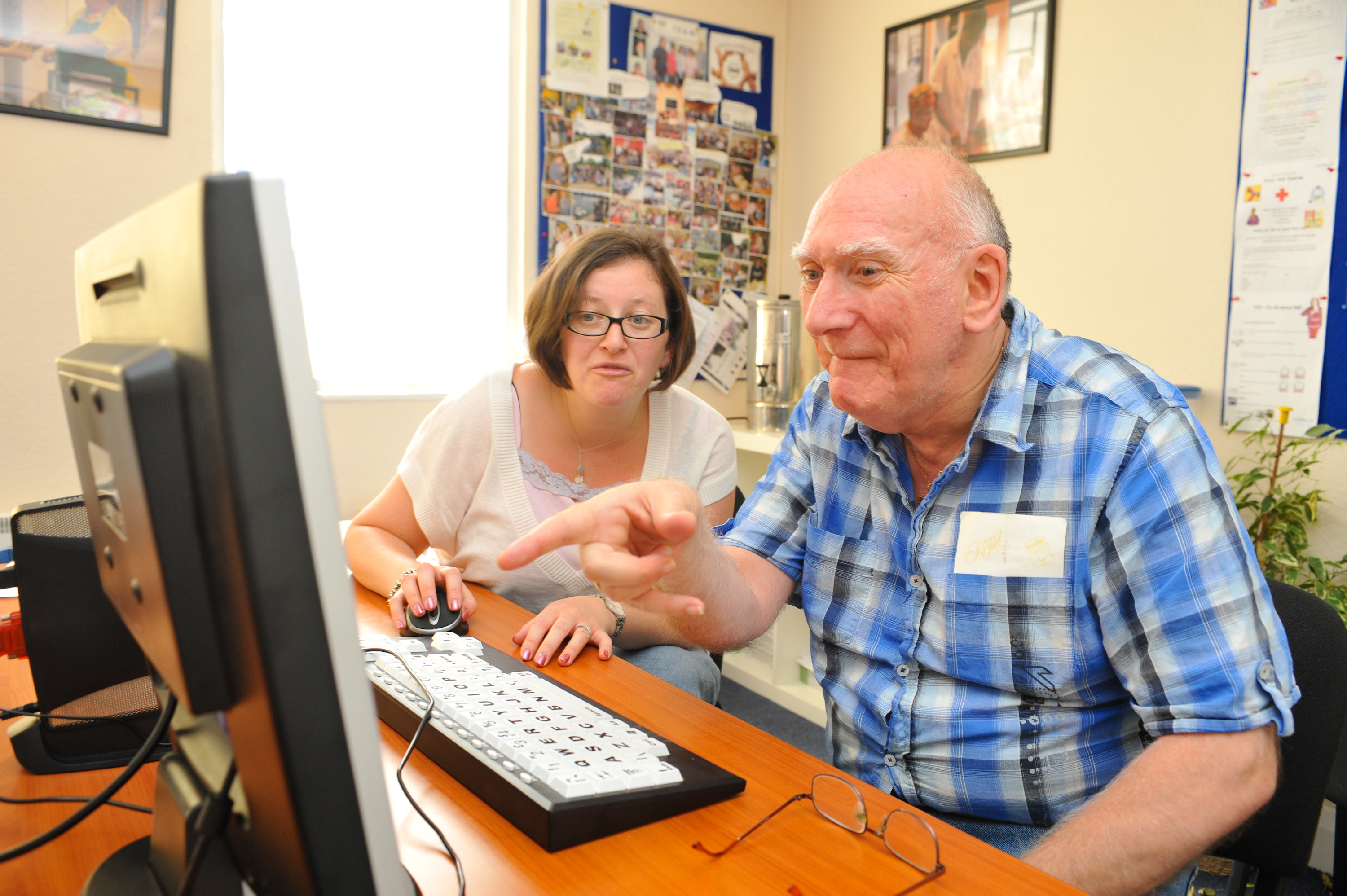
Norwood Adult Services

Life Long Learning Services offers a programme of skills and opportunities for life through individualised learning in London, Berkshire and the South East.

Supported Employment works with adults with learning disabilities and enables them to access work. The service is based at the RD Crusaders WorkHub in Stanmore, which was opened in 2010 by Roger Daltrey and members of the rock super group the RD Crusaders, who helped fund the project.

Links offers leisure, recreation and holiday opportunities for adults with learning disabilities.

Supported Living provides support to adults living in their own homes across London and Berkshire.

Norwood has 11 registered care homes, concentrated in Redbridge, Harrow, Barnet and Brighton. Ravenswood in Berkshire provides accommodation to 140 adults with learning disabilities in 13 registered care homes. The Karten Centre at Ravenswood is a learning hub supporting adults with learning disabilities to learn skills and earn qualifications through educational technology.

== Governance ==
In 2004, the director of Norwood was Ruth Fasht.

In 2006, the appointment of Richard Desmond as president was criticised. Desmond remained in post until 2015.

In 2011, Norma Brier resigned as Chief Executive Officer of Norwood and was succeeded by Elaine Kerr.

In 2023 Naomi Dickson was appointed CEO of Norwood.
