= Drew Findling =

American criminal defense lawyer

- Born: December 21, 1959 (age 66)
- Education: Oglethorpe University (BA); Emory University (JD)
- Spouse: Beth Kaplan Findling
- Children: 3

Drew Findling (born December 21, 1959) is an American criminal defense lawyer known for trying cases in state and federal courts across the country ranging from complex white-collar crimes to serious violent felonies, representing clients who are hip hop musicians, NBA and NFL stars, Grammy Award winners, and elected officials, as well as other well-known clients, including Donald Trump. Based in Atlanta, he is the founding partner of The Findling Law Firm, P.C.

== Early life and education ==
Findling grew up in the blue–collar hamlet of Coram, New York, raised by a single mother who was a grocery store cashier. He was awarded a track scholarship to study at Oglethorpe University, earning a BA degree in 1981. He then earned a JD degree from the Emory University School of Law in 1984.

== Career ==
Findling was admitted to the Georgia Bar in 1984 and spent the first three years of his career as a Fulton County public defender during which time he was the first attorney in the nation to successfully present a battered woman syndrome defense, including on 27 felony counts, based only on verbal abuse. He was awarded the Indigent Defense Award by Georgia Association of Criminal Defense Lawyers (GACDL).

In 2018, Findling was a featured speaker at the Aspen Ideas Festival, participating in a one-on-one interview with journalist Joshua Johnson on "Hip Hop Collision: Music, Race and The Law."

During 2018–2019, Findling was president of the National Association of Criminal Defense Lawyers (NACDL). In 2023, he was appointed as a trustee of the NACDL Foundation for Criminal Justice, and appointed to Board of Advisors for the National Clearinghouse for Science, Technology and the Law.

In 2022, former U.S. president Donald Trump hired Findling to represent him in the ongoing criminal investigation into election interference in Georgia. In 2023, Findling was replaced by Steven Sadow.

Findling doesn't "...choose cases or not take cases because of the race of our client, the ethnicity of our client, the sexual orientation of our client, the substantive charge of the client, the political views of the client.”

== Awards ==
- In 2018, The Hollywood Reporter named Findling one of "Hollywood's Top 20 Troubleshooters".
- In 2018, he was recognized as one of Billboard's "R&B and Hip-hop 100 Power Players".
- In 2018, he was the recipient of the NACDL's Robert C. Heeney Memorial Award, presented each year to only one criminal defense attorney in the country.
- In 2024, Forbes named Findling to its inaugural list of the Top 200 Lawyers in America.
- Findling was presented the NAACP’s Civil and Human Rights Award.
- He was awarded a commendation by the Georgia Legislative Black Caucus.

== Personal life ==
Findling is married to Beth Kaplan Findling, and they have three children, calling himself and them “a family of left-wing liberals.” He has been given the nickname #BillionDollarLawyer, originally conferred by client Young Dolph.
