= Chris (Simpsons artist) =

Pseudonymous British cartoonist

- Born: England
- Known for: Naïve art Satire; Social commentary

Chris (Simpsons artist) is a pseudonymous cartoonist known for his comedic and deliberately childlike caricatures and stream-of-consciousness writing.

== Early life ==
Chris was born in England, where he spent his childhood before moving to Scotland.

== Career ==
Chris has stated that he was first inspired to draw characters from The Simpsons when he was five, around the time the show first went to air. He still caricatures fictional characters such as the cast of The Simpsons, and signs each of his comments with the qualifier "(Simpsons artist)". He is also known for caricaturing real people currently at the centre of the media's attention at that time, such as Prince William and Catherine Middleton at the time of their wedding. He incurred controversy in May 2011 when he posted a caricature of Osama bin Laden.

As a result of his cult following, Chris has been given regular spreads in magazines such as FHM and Front. His career and style were summarised by FHM as "he's the Internet's Picasso, he lives in Scotland somewhere, no one knows his real name, and he does slightly unnerving pictures of famous people". In 2011, Front praised Chris for what they described as his "so-bad-they're-actually-bloody-amazingly-good illustrations". In May 2012, a selection of Chris' artwork was displayed at the IG:LU art gallery in Inverness.

== See also ==
- Nigel Molesworth, a 1950s cartoon series which uses a similar stream-of-consciousness childlike style
