= Karl Power =

English prankster

Karl Power is a prankster from Droylsden, Greater Manchester, England, known for appearing uninvited at sporting events as an impostor. He appeared in the Manchester United team photo before an away UEFA Champions League knockout stage match against Bayern Munich in 2001.

After the stunt, there was a nationwide manhunt in the United Kingdom for Power with tabloid newspapers asking their readers to write in and give them information. He was unmasked to BBC Sport by men's magazine Front, which revealed that Power had entered the stadium pretending to be with a TV crew to gain access to the pitch, and simply walked back to the stands again afterwards to watch the game.

He is a long-term friend of Manchester band Happy Mondays. The hit single "Fat Neck" by their follow-up band, Black Grape, is a tribute to him. He also appeared in Puressence's pop video, "Walking Dead", with Happy Mondays dancer Bez.

Power is now manager of a local Manchester band The Backhanders.

Power was sentenced to 6 months in jail in April 2012 for £26,000 benefit fraud after an anonymous tipoff.

== Manchester United team photos ==
On 18 April 2001, before Manchester United's Champions League match against Bayern Munich, Power walked onto the pitch in team colours as an impostor, and took up a position next to player Andy Cole. Although he was noticed by other players, he managed to remain in place for the team photo.

== England national cricket team ==
When the England cricket team played against Australia at Headingley in 2001, Power walked out to bat with the team. Moments after entering the field, he removed his helmet and was immediately recognised.

== British Grand Prix at Silverstone ==
In 2002, he beat Michael Schumacher to the winners' podium at the British Grand Prix.

== Wimbledon ==
Power managed to get onto Centre Court at Wimbledon and play a short game before a Tim Henman match.

== Re-enactment of Diego Forlán goal ==
On 5 April 2003, Power and several accomplices (hotshot, beanie & bri) invaded the Old Trafford pitch prior to Manchester United's game with Liverpool. Dressed in full United kit, Power and company re-enacted a goal scored by Diego Forlán against Liverpool at Anfield earlier that season. This stunt saw Power banned for life by Manchester United.
