= Naomi Dickson =

British Jewish charity owner

- Occupation: Charity executive
- Known for: CEO of Norwood; former CEO of Jewish Women's Aid
- Awards: BBC 100 Women (2020)

Naomi Dickson is the CEO of Norwood and former CEO of Jewish Women's Aid who has dedicated her professional life to supporting Jewish women and girls who have experienced domestic abuse and educating the Jewish community to have the tools to highlight, expose, and prevent abuse. She recently moved to Norwood, another Jewish charity.

== Biography ==
Dickson began her work with Jewish Women's Aid in 2002 and was appointed Chief Executive Officer in 2014. As Communications and Training Coordinator, she developed the JWA training program to enhance community awareness and equip professionals to identify and support women and girls affected by abuse. IN 2023, she became the CEO of the large Jewish charity Norwood.

Dickson was a trustee of the Women's Aid Federation of England, founder of the Faiths Against Domestic Abuse Coalition and a member of University of Cambridge's senior faith leadership program. In addition, she was a member of the Women in Jewish Leadership Commission from 2011 to 2012.

== Awards ==
She was part of the BBC's 100 Women list which was published on 23 November 2020. The series recognizes the women who have stood out in that year.
