= Asian fetish =

Sexual obsession with Asian people expressed by non-Asians

An Asian fetish is a strong sexual or romantic preference for people of Asian descent or heritage. The term usually refers to women specifically of East or Southeast Asian descent though it may also include those of South Asian descent.

The origins of the sexual fetishization of the people of Asia are unclear. Male Dutch colonists fetishised Southeast Asian women in the Dutch East Indies, on the basis of the darker skin and hair colour of the Indigenous women. Similar accounts were reported in other colonized territories such as the British Raj, where it was common for English men to have Indian mistresses against a backdrop where Indian women were sexualised through what scholars describe as a typical colonial gaze and viewed as seductive, sensual and exotic. After World War II, Japanese women gained prominence in American beauty pageants, at a time when large numbers of Japanese war brides were entering the United States.

Targets of Asian fetishization report a number of harms and psychological burdens as a result of being fetishized, such as anxiety and doubt about the motivations of those who display interest in them, and difficulty asserting their individuality when being reduced to their race and gender.

The term yellow fever (not to be confused with the viral disease yellow fever) is sometimes used to describe the fetishization of East Asians and Southeast Asian men/women by non-Asians, as well as having a preference for dating or marrying men/women of East Asian and Southeast Asian origin. The usage of "yellow" stems from the color terminology for race that is sometimes applied to people of East Asian descent.

While most research in the field focuses on heterosexual males with an Asian fetish (and amongst them, mostly White American heterosexual males), Asian fetish can also be homosexual, directed at Asian men, and be held by people of all races who are not Asian.

== History ==
Although there are multiple theories about the origin of the Asian fetish, it has been posited that modern Asian fetishism in the United States emerged in the aftermath of US involvement in the Pacific War during World War II.

In the 1800s, after the opening of Japan by Matthew Perry, word began to spread in the United States about the sexual appeal of Asian women. Nationalistic fears that Asian women would seduce White men and destroy White families led to the passage of the Page Act of 1875, which prevented Chinese women from entering the United States. However, another purpose of the ban was to limit the reproduction of the Chinese working class in America.

As early as the 1920s, it was noticed that Dutch men preferred South East Asian women over Dutch women. When the Dutch East Indies was a colony of the Dutch Empire, a new beauty ideal was established, which ranked Indigenous women with light brown skin and lustrous black hair at the top. The American consul general to the Dutch East Indies remarked that, to the average man, a mixed-race woman in the colony was considered more attractive than a "pure" Dutch woman, because the complexions of Dutch women were too pale.

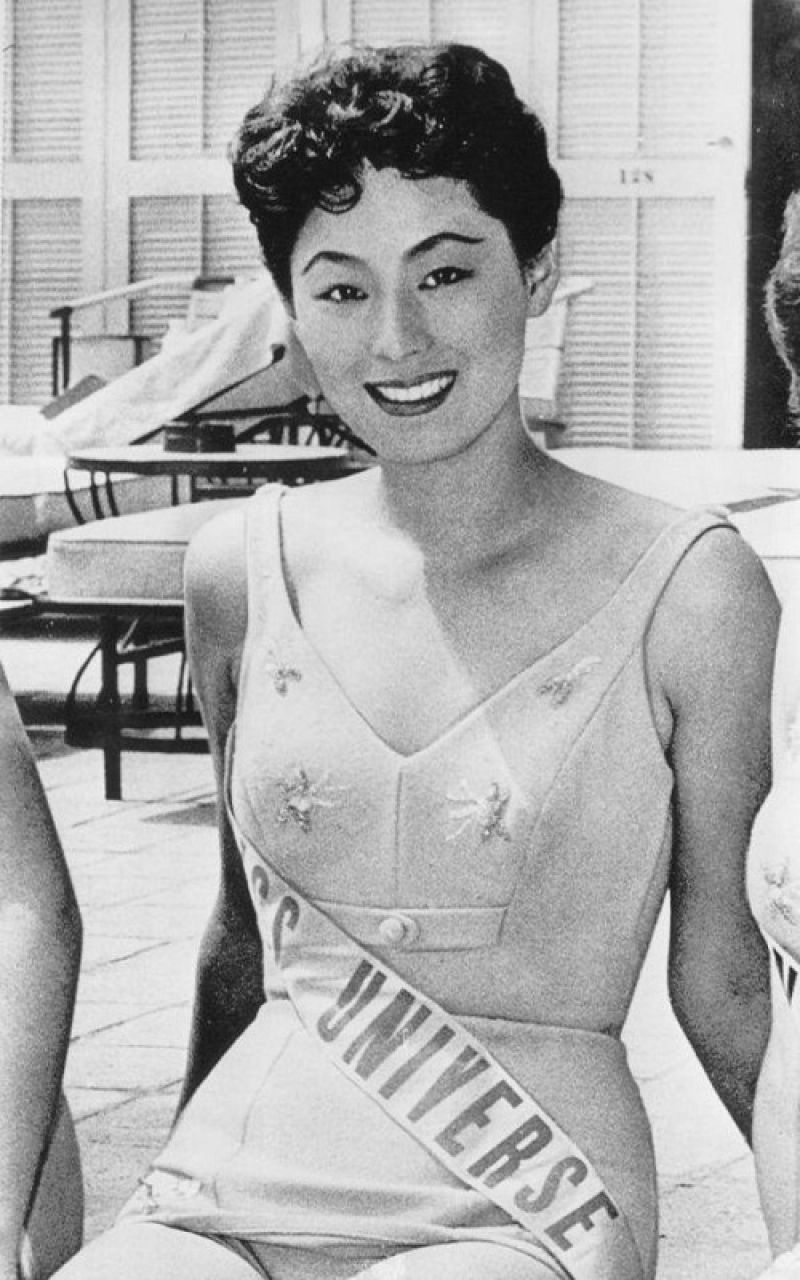
Miss Universe winner Akiko Kojima in 1959. Kojima's victory began the first era of representation of Asian women in the West.

After the surrender of Japan in 1945, the U.S. military occupied Japan, and U.S. soldiers began to interact with Japanese women. Although the American military initially forbid relations with Japanese women; the U.S. servicemen were "enamored" by the femininity of Japanese women, and formed relationships with them anyway. There was a perception that Japanese women were superior to American women, and there was a widespread sentiment "that a Japanese woman's heart was twice as big as those of her American sisters".

In 1959, Akiko Kojima, a Japanese woman, became the first non-white woman to win the Miss Universe beauty pageant. That same year, Miyoshi Umeki, also a Japanese woman, won an Academy Award. This period marked the beginning of the phenomenon known as the "Oriental Wave", during which Asian women first gained prominence in Western media. The wave mainstreamed a stereotype of Asian femininity: slender, shy, and intelligent, yet also sexual.

== Terminology and usage of yellow fever ==
A common term used for Asian fetishization (particularly with East and Southeast Asians) is yellow fever. The term is used as a derogatory pun on the disease of the same name, comparing those with a fetish for East and Southeast Asians or "Orientals" to people who are infected with a disease. Yellow fever is used in Asian fetishization to refer to the color terminology of people of East Asian descent (and some people of Southeast Asian descent), because historically, persons of East Asian heritage have been described as "yellow people" based on the tone of their skin. Hwang argues that this phenomenon is caused by the stereotyping of Asians in Western society. The term yellow fever is analogous to the term jungle fever, a derogatory expression used for racial fetishism associated with dating between different races.

== Research on racial preferences ==
In 2007, a study using a sample of 400 Columbia University students at a speed dating event did not find evidence of a preference among White men for women of East Asian descent. The study found that most people preferred to date within their own race.

A 2008 American study on female facial attractiveness with majority White participants (27 men and 45 women; with a significant proportion of East Asian, and few participants from other backgrounds) found that the faces of White women were rated most attractive. The study showed gradations of computer-generated racial mixes to the participants in increments of one-quarter. The top three rated faces were 100% White, 75% White 25% Black, and 75% White 25% Asian. To the researchers' surprise, Asian women's faces were rated significantly less attractive than White or Black faces in this study.

In 2012, a UK study found that Asian women were rated as more attractive than White and Black women. It was proposed that this was because the features of Asian women were perceived as more feminine, which could explain the high rate of interracial marriages between Asian women and White men in the UK and US. A 2018 facial manipulation experiment conducted in Australia was consistent with these hypotheses, finding both Asian and White participants chose to reduce the "masculine" facial traits of Asian women less than those of White women, which, the authors conclude, suggests that Asian faces may be more feminine to begin with.

In contrast, a 2013 Australian study on facial attractiveness with Asian and White participants found that Asian and White women's faces were not different in attractiveness overall, although a slight own-race bias was observed. However, when rating composite faces (the average of many faces, grouped by race, as opposed to real faces), all participants rated the composite faces more highly and rated the composite faces of White women the highest. In a follow-up experiment, the researchers found that there was no difference in the perceived facial femininity of Asian and White women. Another study that same year, which used a sample of 126,000 OkCupid users in the US, found that all races initiated chats with their own race the most. Another study that same year using a sample of 934,000 online daters in 20 US cities found that Asian women received the most messages on average; however, the authors also noted that own-race preference was the predominant trend. The authors noted that their results "contradict the popular belief that [...] white men prefer Asian women over white women".

A 2015 study using a sample of 58,880 online daters in nine Western European countries found that non-Hispanic White women were the most preferred group of women by far, followed by Hispanic and then Asian women. This tendency surpassed own-race preference as the predominant trend.

A 2018 study using a sample of 187,000 online daters in 4 US cities found that Asian women were the most desired group of women.

While the perceived femininity and sexual capital of Asian women may depend on the population studied, Zheng (2016) argues that attraction is influenced significantly by culture, stating "sexualized stereotypes of Asian women contributes to an individual's sexually preferring them, even if that contribution is not obvious or accessible to introspection."

== Effects of fetishization ==
Encounters with Asian fetishists are a familiar experience for many Asian-American women. Asian women may pick up on clues, such as a history of only dating Asians, even warning each other about potential hotspots for Asian fetishists. While several authors have complicated feelings about the subject, most express frustration at opinions from non-Asians that fetishization is a good thing, pointing out its negative aspects and deconstructing the harmful meanings it entails.

Targets of Asian fetish report feeling depersonalized or homogenized, making them interchangeable with any other Asian woman. Depersonalization is particularly negative in a romantic context, where people want to be recognized as individuals. Depersonalization is a closely related concept to objectification. Some authors have written that the objectification of Asian women can lead to violence if the women are seen as objects rather than people.

Another reported harm of Asian fetishization is the feeling of being "othered", or conceived of outside mainstream norms. Possessing "exotic beauty", as opposed to just "beauty", carries the meaning that the type of beauty is necessarily linked to being Asian. If this is the case, one can only attain beauty by fulfilling stereotypes about Asians. The struggle to have sexuality, but not be defined by racial sexuality, becomes very complicated.

These feelings and the psychological burden they entail can persist even when romantic suitors hold no fetishistic intent. The possibility of an Asian fetish or an awareness of the concept can create anxiety and potentially discourage romantic pursuit.

Nonetheless, some Asian women may embrace certain stereotypes about Asians, such as intelligence and rising Asian economic power. Others may find advantage in wielding the sexual power it grants, creating strategies to turn the tables and exploit the men who are drawn by racialized femininity.

Some research has sought to determine how American culture might affect Asian-American body satisfaction. No clear consensus exists. In a meta-analysis of research, Asian-American women showed near-zero difference in average body satisfaction compared to White American women.

== Fetish and interracial marriage ==
Kumiko Nemoto writes that since the beginning of the twentieth century, there has been a stereotype of Asian women as subservient, loyal, and family oriented. After World War II, feminine images of Asian women made interracial marriage popular between Asian American women and White men. Asian femininity and White masculinity are seen as signs of modern middle-class manhood. Postcolonial and model minority femininity attract some White men to Asian and Asian American women, with the men seeing this type of femininity as providing the perfect marital dynamic. Some White men racialize Asian women as "good wives" or "model minorities" because of the way that Asian women are presented as being stereotypically feminine.

In preparation for a documentary on Asian fetish called Seeking Asian Female, Chinese-American filmmaker Debbie Lum interviewed non-Asian men who posted online personal ads exclusively seeking Asian women. Things that the men found appealing in Asian women included long black hair, a "mysterious" appearance with dark brown eyes, an expected greater consideration for their partner, subtlety and quietness, as well as the shape of the epicanthic fold of their eyelids. Lum characterized the preconceived stereotype associated with an Asian fetish as an obsession with seeking "somebody submissive, traditional, docile... the perfect wife who is not going to talk back", but found she had to overcome stereotypes and expectations just like the participants did.

In interviews done by Bitna Kim, "Caucasian" men explain their fetish for Asian women. The Caucasian men interviewed talk about their stereotypes of Asian women, fantasizing that they possess both beauty and brains, are "sexy, intelligent, successful, professional, caring, and family oriented"; do not wear "White girl clothes" and heavy makeup, and are not high maintenance. Hence, the men believe that Asian women have respectable mannerisms. These men see Asian women to be exotic, thus desirable, because of their supposed mysterious beauty and possession of a physical appearance perceived to be petite. Sexually, the men in these interviews had one thing in common: while almost all disagreed with describing Asian women as submissive, they all believed that Asian women have submissive sex ("liking to explore new positions, being willing to experiment, or enjoying kinky sex, such as spanking"). They believed that an Asian woman was agreeable and did not mind pleasing men. These interviews show that some "Caucasian" men with an Asian fetish believe that an Asian woman embodies a perfect wife as a "princess in public and a whore in the bedroom".

Historically, the number of Thai women marrying Western men began to rise in the 1950s and 1960s as a result of Prime Minister Sarit Thanarat's economic policies which attracted foreign investment and Western men to Thailand. There is a social stigma in the country against Thai women marrying White men, who are also referred to as farang (a term used for people of European origin), but research published in 2015 indicated that an increasing number of young middle-class Thai women were marrying foreign men. A generation earlier, Thai women marrying foreign men had mostly been working class.

Some sources indicate that Sri Lanka is popular among Western "marriage bureaus" which specialize in the pairing of men who were "Europeans, North Americans and other westerners" with foreign women. The first and largest arrival of Sri Lankan immigrants to Denmark were Sinhalese women who came to the country in the 1970s to marry Danish men they had met in Sri Lanka.

Filipina, Thai, and Sri Lankan women have traveled as mail-order brides to Europe, Australia, and New Zealand. Venny Villapando writes that many of the countries affected by the modern mail-order bride business, typically those in East and South-East Asia, have a history of US military involvement. Soldiers stationed in these countries developed ideas of Asian women as sex workers, bargirls, and geishas, and applied the resultant stereotype of sexualized obedience to Asian-American women. The marketing techniques used by mail-order bride companies generally reinforce this stereotype. Statistics detailing the sponsorship of spouses and fiancées to Australia from 1988 to 1991 show that more women from the Philippines, Singapore, Malaysia, Sri Lanka, Vietnam, Indonesia, South Korea, and India were sponsored for citizenship than men from the same countries.

== Tourism ==
Sex tourism is a social phenomenon where individuals, generally heterosexual men from wealthier countries, travel to other countries, in search of sexual experiences. Several countries in Southeast Asia, particularly with strong economic disparities with western countries, have become destinations for sex tourism. Some of these countries include Thailand, the Philippines, Cambodia and Vietnam.

Data published in 1999 indicated that an estimated 200,000 to 400,000 German men annually traveled abroad for sex tourism, with the Philippines, Thailand, South Korea, Sri Lanka, and Hong Kong as their main destinations. For some White men, sex tourism to countries such as Thailand is built around a fantasy that includes the possibility of finding love and romance. According to Dr. David Jedlicka's 1983 study, this idea is based on the stereotype of "the Oriental woman" who is considered to be beautiful and sexually exciting as well as caring, compliant, and submissive. Kimberly Hoang writes that there may be mistaken conflation of "submission" with "care".

Although not as widely recognized as male sex tourism, there have also been cases of western female sex tourism in Indonesia, including Bali.

A 2023 CNN article highlighted a growing trend of Western female tourists traveling to South Korea with the primary goal of pursuing a romantic fantasy with a Korean man. A researcher interviewed 123 women fitting this profile between 2017 and 2018. They came from various countries, primarily North America, Russia, and Europe, and were typically heterosexual and in their early to mid-20s. Unlike typical tourists focused on sightseeing, these women prioritized nightlife – dressing up and frequenting clubs in hopes of meeting their ideal Korean partner. Some had even learned Korean beforehand to overcome language barriers, while others relied on a mix of Korean and English. The researcher described these women as part of a larger trend called "Hallyu tourists" that were inspired by Korean dramas. Some authors are concerned that Korean wave fans simplifies Korean men into stereotypes, ignoring their complexity as individuals and the realities of relationships.

== In popular media ==
Mirroring the larger mainstream culture, within hip-hop culture, Asian women have long been fetishized. The hip hop group 2 Live Crew eroticized Asian women in their 1988 hit single "Me So Horny", which topped the charts in the Netherlands. The song was so sexually explicit that the State of Florida banned its sale; however the ban was later overturned after 2 Live Crew filed a free speech lawsuit. In later songs, 2 Live Crew spoke about their fetish for Asian women, and their desire to have sex with Japanese women. Asian models were featured prominently in their music videos. Another notable song depicting the fetishization of Asian women is the song "Yellow Fever" by Bloodhound Gang. The song depicted exoticized references to various Asian things in American pop culture, as well as many stereotypes, and contained many Sinophobic slurs. This song was very controversial upon its release, and as such was omitted from its album, One Fierce Beer Coaster, during a re-release by Geffen Records. The song received great controversy among Asian American students at the University of Maryland, with many asking for the band to not play the song there.

According to Marenda Tran, Asian women in the media tend to be portrayed in two ways: as an exotic foreigner, docile and nonthreatening and sexual but also innocent; or as the nerd who is still aesthetically pleasing, but also emotionless and career-oriented. This leads many Asian women to believe that they have to be in one of these boxes. It tends to convey the message that if they are smart, they cannot be sexual; or, if they are sexual, they tend to not be aware of it. By the late 2010s, movies such as Crazy Rich Asians and The Farewell began to break these boundaries, but they are movies that center around the Asian experience, allowing for more diversity across Asian characters.

In her essay "Hateful Contraries: Media Images of Asian Women", British filmmaker Pratibha Parmar comments that the media's imagery of Asian women is "contradictory" in that it represents them as "completely dominated by their men, mute and oppressed" while also showing them as "sexually erotic creatures".

In her essay Lotus Blossoms Don't Bleed: Images of Asian Women, American filmmaker Renee Tajima-Peña identifies two basic stereotypes of Asian women in the United States. The "Lotus Blossom Baby" is a feminine and delicate sexual-romantic object. In contrast, the "Dragon Lady" is treacherous and devious, and in some cases, a madam. Tajima suggests that this view of Asian women contributes to the existence of the Asian mail-order bride industry in the US.

Some authors have raised concerns that the rise of K-pop and the Hallyu wave has led to racially charged attitudes that surpass healthy appreciation, veering into an obsessive fetishization of Korean men. Anecdotal examples of this phenomenon include fan comments such as, "I want to date a Korean guy so badly!" and "I wish I were a Korean girl so my bias would like me". One author emphasized that while it is entirely acceptable to find someone attractive, it is essential to distinguish between genuine appreciation for an individual and fetishization based on superficial stereotypes or generalizations over their race. Another author who interviewed female tourists in hostels, across South Korea used the term "Netflix effect" to describe how romantic Korean dramas have influenced global romance tourism, arguing that as global access to these dramas increases, media-inspired tourism is likely to grow alongside it.

== Pornography ==
Pornographic performers Saya Song, Jade Kush, and Venus Lux have voiced their objections to being cast in heavily stereotyped roles. They point toward creator-oriented platforms in the hope that they will grant performers autonomy.

Asa Akira was uncomfortable with fetishization early in her career, but has since grown to embrace it, saying, "I mean, it's not like guys are watching my movies and laughing. They're watching my movies and masturbating." Mika Tan sees Asian fetishization in pornography as a relatively harmless replacement for "trolling the bars with the intent of getting rid of [...] sexual frustrations on any woman who happens along". Her opinion is that "Porn does not create fetishes, it caters to them."

Philosophy and sociology scholars have also examined Asian fetishization in pornography. In Robin Zheng's view, the ubiquity and custom-tailored nature of internet pornography "plays a central role in licensing the self-identification with and public recognition of racialized sexual preferences like yellow fever". She further states that the pornography industry stands to benefit from encouraging Asian fetish as a distinct category to suit their marketing needs.

Some scholars have theorized the ways in which fetishization in pornography may exacerbate racial stereotypes, with others highlighting the ways Asian pornographic performers are able to challenge racial stereotypes within their films, while also refuting the idea that they themselves have no control or agency. Zheng says that there is "no way to win" in this scenario: that Asian presence and absence in pornography both have significant downsides.

Gossett and Byrne conducted a content analysis study of 31 "internet rape sites" in 2002 and found that thirty-four of the 56 clear images analyzed depicted Asian women as victims, and that nearly half of the sites contained either text references or images of Asian women. In 2016, Zhou and Paul looked at a sample of 3053 videos from XVideos, and found that the 170 videos in the Asian women category had much less aggression, and less objectification than other categories, but that the performers also had less agency in their scenes. In 2019, Shor and Golriz looked at a sample of 172 videos from Pornhub, and they found that the 25+ videos in the Asian/Japanese category had considerably more aggression than those of other categories. Miller & McBain and Rothman deem that findings of the depictions of Asian women and race in pornography are not consistent or comprehensive.

== See also ==
- Amejo
- Asian Babes – UK pornographic magazine
- Asian Fever – U.S. pornographic magazine
- Stereotypes of East Asians in the United States § Women
- Ethnic pornography
- Sinophilia
- Japanophilia
- Miscegenation
- Orientalism
- Potato queen
- Race and sexuality
- Rice queen
- Sarong party girl
- Sexualization and sexual exploitation in K-pop
- Yellow cab (stereotype)

== Citations ==
- Fang, Janet (19 April 2021). "The Deadly Consequences of Hypersexualizing Asian Women". Scientific American.
- Forbes, Nicola; Yang, Lauren C.; Lim, Sahnah (27 February 2023). "Intersectional discrimination and its impact on Asian American women's mental health: A mixed-methods scoping review". Frontiers in Public Health. 11 993396. Bibcode:2023FrPH...1193396F. doi:10.3389/fpubh.2023.993396. PMC 10008964. PMID 36923035.
- "Racial Violence against Asian Americans". Harvard Law Review. 106 (8). The Harvard Law Review Association: 1926–43. June 1993. doi:10.2307/1341790. JSTOR 1341790.
- Woan, Sunny (March 2008). "White Sexual Imperialism: A Theory of Asian Feminist Jurisprudence". Washington and Lee Journal of Civil Rights and Social Justice. 14 (2): 2, 19. ISSN 1535-0843.
- Zheng, Robin (2016). "Why Yellow Fever Isn't Flattering: A Case against Racial Fetishes" (PDF). Journal of the American Philosophical Association. 2 (3): 400–419. doi:10.1017/apa.2016.25.
