= Sarong party girl =

Term originating in Singapore

A sarong party girl (also known as an SPG) is a term used in Singapore and Malaysia to refer to ethnically Chinese, Malay or Indian women who date or socialize with white men. The term has been reappropriated by some Singaporean women who self-identify as "sarong party girls".

== Etymology ==
The term sarong party girl has its fairly innocuous roots in the late 1940s to early 1950s when Singapore was still ruled by the British Empire. In general, the British forces personnel socialised very much among themselves, according to their military ranks and status (i.e. officers as opposed to enlisted men). However, sometimes specific local Singaporean "guests" were invited to social functions hosted by the British. The term sarong party came to describe social functions which included local invited "ladies" who wore the sarong, a native word for a wrap-around skirt popular among local Singaporean men and women of the time.

== Common stereotypes ==
Historically, the stereotypical sarong party girl had a local foreign accent, was dressed in a sarong, and exclusively dated or preferred white men either resident in Singapore or foreigners. One sarong party girl stereotype in local entertainment is usually of a opportunistic, husband-seeking Asian woman, and this perception contributed much to Singapore's decadent image in the 1970s, as seen in films such as Saint Jack. Due to these stereotypes, women who are classified as sarong party girls often attract sweeping attention. This particular sarong party girl stereotype was popularised by a series of humorous books by Australian writer Jim Aitchison in the 1990s, offering a satirical portrayal of the sarong party girls and related aspects of Singaporean culture.

Over time, the term has taken on a somewhat more positive meaning. Nowadays, sarong party girls are no longer identified by a unique dress code or appearance, referring simply to any local woman who prefers to socialize with males of a Caucasian ethnicity, particularly for romantic relationships. A sarong party girl is commonly perceived as an attractive, exhuberant, party-loving girl who prefers socialising with caucasions versus their own community and race stemming from global exposures, while showing a preference towards white people and de-prioritising their local cultural practices.

== See also ==
- Ang mo
- Amejo
- Asian fetish
- Colonial mentality
- Hanjian
- Pinkerton syndrome
- Yellow cab (stereotype)

== Bibliography ==
- Aitchison, Jim (1994). Sarong Party Girl. Angsana Books. ISBN 981-3056-36-3.
- Aitchison, Jim (1995). Revenge of the Sarong Party Girl. Angsana Books. ISBN 981-3056-60-6.
- Aitchison, Jim (1996). The SPG Rides Again. Angsana Books. ISBN 981-3056-09-6.
