= Asian Fever =

American pornographic magazine

- Editor: Larry Flynt
- Categories: Pornographic men's
- Frequency: 13 / year
- Circulation: under 500,000
- First issue: February 1999
- Company: LFP Internet Group
- Country: USA
- Language: English
- Website: www.asianfever.com
- ISSN: 1521-6586

Asian Fever was the name of an adult magazine published in the United States, which was followed by a companion adult video series.

== Overview ==
The magazine featured explicit photos of naked young women. It featured pictorials of East Asian women, interviews with Asian porn stars, and reviews of Asian pornography DVDs.

Asian Fever was published thirteen times per year by Larry Flynt's Larry Flynt Publications, and Hustler Video also produces an Asian Fever line of videos. Asian Fever writer David Aaron Clark became a director for the Asian Fever series with the twenty-fifth entry.

The first chapter of Butterfly: An Erotic Odyssey - Thailand, Cambodia, Philippines by Steven Yang first appeared in the magazine, with the book itself later being blurbed by Asian Fever.

Under the subheading "Me Love You Long Time" in the essay "White and Wong: Race, Porn, and the Word Wide Web" by Darrell Y. Hamamoto in Image Ethics in the Digital Age (edited by Larry P. Gross, John Stuart Katz, and Jay Ruby), it is noted that Hustler's Asian Fever was part of a "boomlet in skin magazines in the United States that cater to the Asiaphile," connected to the "White male fetishization of the Yellow female-object". "We Love You Long Time" happens to be the tagline on the first of the Asian Fever DVDs.

== See also ==
- Asian Babes – UK magazine
- Asian fetish
