= Steven Sadow =

American criminal defense attorney

Steven H. Sadow is an American criminal defense attorney. He is the lead counsel for Donald Trump during his Georgia election racketeering prosecution.

== Education and personal life ==
Sadow graduated from Marietta College in 1976 before obtaining a Juris Doctor from Emory University in 1979.

Sadow grew up in Trotwood, Ohio.

== Career ==
Sadow was admitted to the Georgia Bar in 1979. From 2009 to 2023, Sadow was special counsel at Schulten Ward Turner & Weiss. Sadow has been a sole practitioner as the owner-operator of Steven H. Sadow PC. since 1986. Based in Atlanta, Georgia, Sadow describes himself as a lawyer for "white collar and high-profile" cases. Sadow has a reputation as one of Atlanta's "most talented criminal defense lawyers."

In 2021, Sadow was a critic of Racketeer Influenced and Corrupt Organizations Act, claiming that the law was both overused and also used beyond reasonable limits. In 2023, he took over from Drew Findling as the lead counsel for Donald Trump during his Georgia election racketeering prosecution. (In 2017, Sadow had stated that he did not support Donald Trump.)

Other notable clients include the rappers Gunna, T.I., Usher, Rick Ross, Ty Dolla Sign and lawyer Howard K. Stern. He also represented The Gold Club (strip club) owner Steven E. Kaplan during a fourteen-week racketeering trial in 2001.

== See also ==
- Legal affairs of the first Donald Trump presidency
- Legal affairs of the second Donald Trump presidency
