= Amejo =

Japanese derogatory term for Okinawan women who date American men

Amejo (アメ女; pronounced [amedʑo] from "Ame(rika)" woman) is a Japanese derogatory term for young Okinawan women who date male members of the United States Forces Japan stationed in Okinawa Prefecture. The other component of the term (女 jo) means "female" or "girl".

There are scholars who note that amejo means someone who has an affinity for America and that the derogatory connotation was a result of a misunderstanding of the Okinawan language.

In her book Asian Mystique, author Sheridan Prasso explained the amejo in terms of the fetishizing that goes on between non-Asian males and Asian females:

In Asia, the East-West cultural divide, gender divisions, as well as economic disparity make it hard to figure out who is playing whom in the games of sex and power between Western men and Asian women. Misimpressions, stereotypes, and cultural misunderstandings color the perspectives of both sides, and the spaces where the perspectives meet are blurred.

Although Amejo is predominantly used for Okinawan women in relationships with white men, those who date primarily black American men are also included under the term, but are usually referred to as kokujo (黒女; black woman) or "black(loving) girl" instead.

Prasso explains the kokujo:

These are girls who sit under tanning lights or decline to sit—as most Asians prefer—in the shade at the beach. They cornrow their hair like Snoop Dogg or kink it like Beyoncé; get surgical implants in their buttocks and breasts; learn dance moves by watching MTV; and wear the skimpy hip-hop fashions that they see in specialty magazines dedicated just to them. Some are big girls, heavy-set, and even tomboys, who find that Japanese men—who generally prefer baby-doll cute as their sexual aesthetic—aren't attracted to them, and vice-versa.

For Americans stationed in Okinawa, the term amejo came to mean American groupie or a "night owl". An account described how the term amejo was embraced by some who were given the pejorative, reappropriating the label as a source of pride, resistance, and social distinction as well as a demonstration of courage to be different.

== See also ==
- Asian fetish
- Pinkerton syndrome
- Sarong party girl
- Yellow cab (stereotype)
