= Portland TV =

British television company (1995–2020)

- Country: United Kingdom
- TV stations: Television X, Xrated, Dirty Talk
- Headquarters: London Docklands
- Key people: Chris Ratcliff (managing director)
- Established: 1995
- Dissolved: 2020

Portland TV was a British adult television company that provided subscription and pay-per-view services to UK audiences on the Sky UK, Virgin TV and Freeview platforms.

== History ==
The company was established in the London Borough of Tower Hamlets in 1995 as the adult broadcasting division of the British publishing group Northern & Shell. At one point, Portland owned its own broadcasting facilities, but they were transferred to Channel 5, which Northern & Shell also then owned. In 2009, Portland launched sporting pay-per-view service Primetime, their first venture outside the adult PPV market.

In 2016, Portland TV was sold by Northern & Shell in a management buy-out, becoming wholly owned by Neon X, in a deal that saw Northern & Shell's complete departure from involvement in the UK television industry. Portland was reportedly sold for less than £1 million after contributing less than two per cent of group revenues per year over the previous three years, or about £9 million per annum. Portland's managing director, Chris Ratcliff, led the buyout. At the time, Portland was broadcasting five adult channels and two on-demand online services.

In September 2020, MindGeek subsidiary MG Global Entertainment (Europe) Limited (now named Aylo Global Entertainment (Europe) Limited), who owned other adult pay-per-view networks in the United Kingdom, purchased Portland TV and merged it into their own operations.

== Channels ==
Television X was launched in 1995. Additional channels were launched as sub-brands of Television X, and the channel began Internet streaming content in 2007. Red Hot TV was launched in 2000 as an additional set of adult channels; the brand was renamed Xrated in 2017.

=== Transferred to MG Global Entertainment ===
- Television X (1995-present, formerly The Fantasy Channel)

=== Other channels ===
- Adult chat networks
  - Cream
  - Dirty Talk
  - Filth
  - Skincity
- Other Pay-Per-View Networks
  - Extreme Filth
  - Viewer's Wives
- Erotika networks
  - Erotika 1 (Launched in June 2003, closed on 1 March 2004)
  - Erotika 2 (Launched in June 2003, closed on 2 February 2004)
  - Erotika 3 (Launched in June 2003, closed on 2 February 2004)
  - Erotika 4 (Launched in June 2003, closed on 16 October 2003, replaced with Television X 2)
  - Erotika 5 (Launched in June 2003, closed on 16 October 2003, replaced with Television X 3)
  - Erotika 6 (Launched in June 2003, closed on 16 October 2003)
- Red Hot networks
  - Red Hot 40+ (2000-2013, formerly Red Hot Euro and Red Hot 40+ Wives)
  - Red Hot Girl Girl (2000-2009, formerly Red Hot Films, Red Hot Only 18 and Red Hot All Girl)
  - Red Hot Amateur (2001-2016, rebranded as Viewer's Wives)
  - Red Hot 18s (2002-2016, formerly Red Hot Wives and Red Hot DD, and Red Hot TV, rebranded as Xtreme Filth in 2016)
  - Red Hot Climax (2002-2007, formerly Red Hot UK Talent)
  - Red Hot Euro (2004-2005)
  - Red Hot Reality (2004-2007, formerly Red Hot Films and Red Hot Movies)
  - Red Hot Raw (2001-2008), formerly Red Hot All Girl
  - Red Hot Viewers (2005-2008, formerly Red Hot Rears)
  - Red Hot Just 18 (2007-2009, formerly Red Hot Reality)
  - Red Hot Fetish (2007-2012)
  - Red Hot Mums (2009-2016, rebranded solely as Red Hot)
- Television X sister channels
  - Bangers! (2005-2020, formerly Television Xtra, Television X4, Television X Brits, TVXXX and TVX Pornstars)
  - Television X Amateur (2002-2012, formerly Television X2 and Television X Raw)
  - Television X FFWD (2003-2009, formerly Television X3 and Television X Live)
  - Television X HD (2019)
  - Television X Pay-Per-Night (2017-2019, formerly Xrated Couples)
  - Television X Pay-Per-Night 2 (2017-2019, formerly Xrated Hook-Ups)
- Sporting Networks
  - Primetime
- Bollywood channel
  - Bollywood Films (2004)

== Regulatory issues ==
In both 2008 and 2009, Portland was fined by Ofcom for broadcasting material equivalent to BBFC classification R18 on their Television X channels. The fines were £52,500 in total. In the same years, Portland was found to have breached the broadcasting code by advertising R18 website content on Red Hot TV, and on the second such occasion Portland was fined £25,000 by Ofcom.
