= Sassy Pandez =

English DJ and model

Sassy Pandez is an English hip-hop, RnB, reggaeton, dancehall and club classics DJ and model from London.

== DJ career ==
Pandez started DJing in Miami with her cousin DJ Radamas. Early in her career, she was known as DJ Sassy P. She DJed at the Miami Music Conference and her first major event was at the P Diddy Launch Party at Cafe de Paris. She has DJed for celebrities including Mary J. Blige, Will Smith, P Diddy, Eminem, Beyoncé Knowles and Jay-Z, and at parties all over the world, including Europe, North America, and Asia. In 2009, international appearances included visits to Turkey, where she opened the Kyu Club, and Singapore, where she played the City Alive street festival.

== Modelling career ==
Pandez's modelling career began when she was signed by Elite Milan. She has been on the covers of various magazines, and has been featured in Cosmopolitan, Elle, Vogue, GQ, FHM, and Maxim. Pandez was described as "The Sexiest DJ in the World" on the cover of Maxim. She has also done shows for numerous fashion designers and shot a variety of advertising campaigns.

Pandez has shot campaigns for Diet Coke and Selfridges, and was featured in a national billboard ad campaign for LastMinute.com. She was voted to represent Mates Condoms as "Miss Mates Xplore 04".

== Other work ==
In 2004, she began working weekly with The Sun online providing advice to readers, a role she retained at least through July 2006. In 2006, she appeared on ITV's Poor Little Rich Girls, where she traded places for a week with a cleaning woman. In 2010, she became the new face and DJ of the Apple Bottoms clothing label owned by US rapper Nelly, as reported by the Metro newspaper.
