= Dominic McVey =

British businessman (born 1985)

Dominic Edward Henry McVey (born February 1985) is a British entrepreneur from London who started business at the age of 13, importing micro-scooters from the United States into the United Kingdom.

== Career ==
The son of a percussionist with the Royal Shakespeare Company, McVey was a millionaire by age 15. As of 2011, he was worth £10 million (approx. US$15 million) according to the Sunday Times Rich List.

By the age of 18 he was appointed by the Queen as a "Pioneer for Britain in Entrepreneurism". He runs a portfolio of business interests from fashion and music to media and cosmetics. He is an adviser on entrepreneurship to the Department of Enterprise, Trade and Employment of the Irish Government. He has consulted for a wide group of institutions and organisations including the DTi and DfES, and was an independent trustee for the Landscape Institute.

In August 2009 it was reported in Marketing Week that McVey's business interests had expanded into magazine and website publishing, which includes the acquisition of men's lifestyle magazine Front, making him the UK's youngest national magazine publisher. He and Francis Ridley co-own Kane, a publishing company.

In 2009, McVey was named Britain's second most influential businessperson under the age of 30 in The Sunday Times' "Top 30 power players under 30".
