= Sports Tonight Live =

British Television Show

Sports Tonight
- Country: United Kingdom
- Broadcast area: United Kingdom

Programming
- Language(s): English

History
- Launched: 29 August 2011

Links
- Website: www.sportstonightlive.com

Availability

Terrestrial
- Freeview: FreeviewHD 244

Streaming media
- SportsTonightLive.com: Watch live

Sports Tonight Live, branded simply as Sports Tonight, was a British television show and channel, owned by VISION247 based in Central London. It was launched online on 29 August 2011.

On 15 October 2011, Sports Tonight Live began to broadcast on Freeview, where it is listed as Sports. The channel requires an internet connected Freeview HD set-top box or television, although the service may not be compatible with early Freeview HD equipment. Sports Tonight Live was the first English language channel to use VisionIPTV's studio production and internet broadcast playout services. It was also the first over-the-top delivered channel on the Freeview platform.

Sports Tonight Live has also previously broadcast free-to-air on BEN Television and free-to-view on Primetime.

Every show is broadcast live for four hours every week night and during the afternoon at the weekend. At other times, the latest programme is shown on a loop and branded as Sports Tonight Replay. From 17 August 2012, Sports Tonight Live began to air live Polish football from the Ekstraklasa three times a week.

In October 2014, Vision247 moved Sportstonightlive to FreeviewHD244 & currently broadcasts live five nights a week. BetRacingNation part of SportstonightLive also broadcasts live on SKY 212 every Saturday morning from 10am.
