= Northern & Shell =

British publishing and television group

Northern & Shell plc

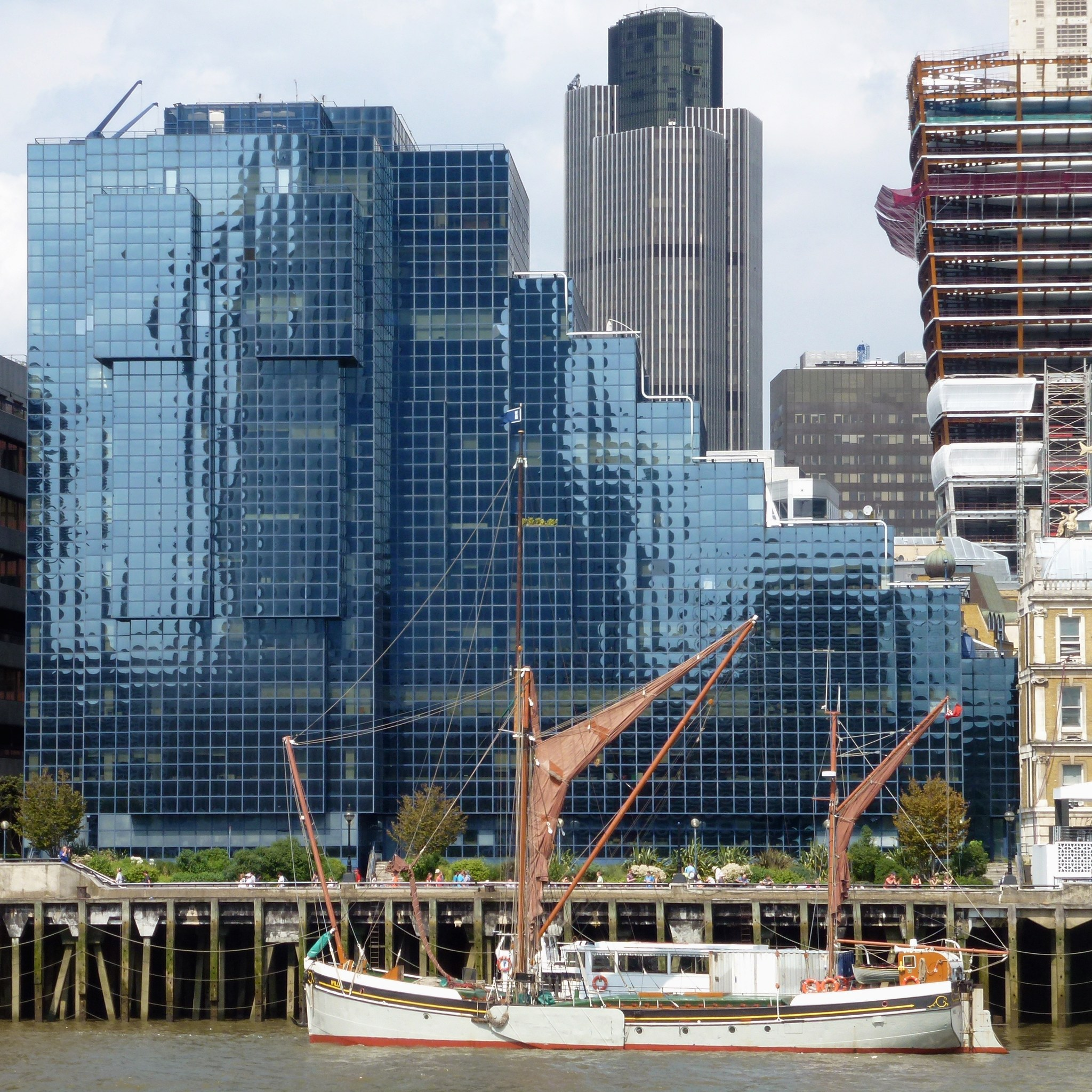
- The Northern & Shell Building in front of Tower 42, with 20 Fenchurch Street under construction, in August 2012.
- Type: Limited company
- Founded: December 1974; 51 years ago
- Founder: Richard Desmond
- Headquarters: Lower Thames Street; London, EC3; United Kingdom
- Services: Publishing and television
- Owner: Richard Desmond
- Website: northernandshell.co.uk

Northern & Shell (holding company name Northern and Shell Network Ltd) is a British publishing group, founded in December 1974 and owned since then by Richard Desmond. Formerly a publisher of pornographic magazines including Penthouse and Asian Babes, it published the Daily Express, Sunday Express, Daily Star and Daily Star Sunday, and the magazines OK!, New! and Star until these were sold to Trinity Mirror in February 2018. Northern & Shell also owned three entertainment television channels: Channel 5, 5* and 5USA until 2015. It owned Portland TV, which operates pornographic TV channels including Television X and Red Hot TV; the company sold Portland in April 2016.

Northern & Shell has operated The Health Lottery in the UK since it launched in 2011.

== History ==
Desmond founded Northern & Shell in 1974 and launched a magazine called International Musician and Recording World. In 1983, Northern & Shell obtained the licence to publish Penthouse in the United Kingdom which led to its publishing a range of pornographic titles, Asian Babes among them. The company's business model for pornographic magazines focussed on specialisation and niche publishing, with multiple titles produced at low cost and targeted at particular tastes. These titles were later sold in 2004. It was the first company to move to the revamped Docklands and the Princess Royal opened the offices.

When the company moved to the Northern & Shell Tower in Canary Wharf, the Duke of Edinburgh opened the offices.

In the early 1990s Northern & Shell began to publish a wider range of magazines, including comics and the gay lifestyle magazine Attitude. Other titles were For Women, a women's magazine launched in 1992 in the style of Cosmopolitan but with nude male photosets, and the celebrity weekly OK!, which started as a monthly in 1993.

By 1996, the pornographic subsidiary, Fantasy Publications, claimed to be selling 1.5 million copies a month of magazines such as Amateur Video, Real Wives, New Talent and Penthouse. In November 2000, Northern & Shell acquired Express Newspapers from United News & Media for £125 million, enlarging the group to include the Daily and Sunday Express titles, the Daily Star and Daily Star Sunday (which Desmond started), and the Irish Star (owned jointly with the Irish Independent group). The Daily and Sunday Express each sell around 700,000 copies per issue. Northern & Shell had borrowed £97 million (approximately US$190 million) for the Express group purchase.

Northern & Shell's "portfolio" of soft-porn magazines was offered for sale in 2001 in order to provide cash to invest in the then newly acquired Express Newspapers group. Some viewed the sale as an attempt to distance the company from the pornography business, but most analysts believed it to be only a financial move as The Fantasy Channel, Northern and Shell's adult cable channel, wasn't included in the sale.

In 2004, Northern & Shell sought acquisition of additional publications — The Spectator and The Daily Telegraph, along with its sister publication The Sunday Telegraph. It was unsuccessful in its bid for The Telegraph, losing out to David and Frederick Barclay, who had long sought to own the paper.

On 23 July 2010, Northern & Shell bought Channel 5 Broadcasting Limited, which operates Channel 5, 5* and 5USA for €125 million (£103.5 million) from the RTL Group. On 1 May 2014, the channels were sold to Viacom for £450 million (US$759 million).

In 2013, Northern & Shell announced that its TV listing magazine TV Pick would no longer be published.

In 2014, Northern & Shell invested in a series of startups under the brand Northern & Shell Ventures. This included investments in OpenRent, Tepilo and Lulu.

In February 2018, Trinity Mirror purchased Northern & Shell's publishing operations (titles including the Daily Express, Sunday Express, Daily Star and Daily Star Sunday; and three celebrity magazines, OK!, New!, and Star) for £126.7 million.

== Building ==
The building at 10 Lower Thames Street was built in 1985 and has a distinctive blue glass facade. It is next door to the old Billingsgate fish market and was first built for Samuel Montagu & Co. It is now partly occupied by N&S and partly rented out as serviced offices.

The building featured in the TV series Bergerac, Series 6 Episode 6 "A man of sorrows", the building frontage badged as Insurance company Norman Deutscher Greenburg. Inside the building features some interior lifts with panoramic views overlooking the foyer.
