= Red Hot TV (UK) =

Set of British pornographic television channels (2000–2017)

Ownership
- Owner: Portland TV
- Sister channels: Television X

History
- Launched: 19 June 2000
- Closed: March 2017
- Replaced by: Xrated

Red Hot TV was a set of British television channels that broadcast pornographic content on a pay-per-view basis.

The channels began broadcasting on the Sky satellite TV system in June 2000 under the group title of Red Hot TV. The channels were owned by Portland TV which also owned the pornographic subscription channel Television X. Portland TV was a division of Northern & Shell until it was sold in April 2016 in a management buy-out.

In March 2017, the Red Hot channels were replaced with a brand known as Xrated.

== History ==
Red Hot TV launched on 19 June 2000 with two channels – Red Hot Euro and Red Hot Films. Similar to Portland's existing Television X network, both Red Hot channels operated on a pay-per-view basis, broadcasting programmes from 10 pm to 4 am. They were operated as budget channels, providing a night's programming for £2.49.

The number of channels expanded with the addition of Red Hot Amateur in February 2001, followed by Red Hot All Girl in November 2001, Red Hot Wives in March 2002, and Red Hot UK Talent in October 2002. Red Hot also launched on the NTL system during 2002, with Amateur, Films, and All Girl being broadcast on the cable provider.

The first brand changes occurred in April 2003. At the beginning of June, Red Hot Euro was replaced with Red Hot 40+ Wives. The channels were moved to a different location on the Sky EPG in July 2003. In October, Red Hot Films was replaced with Red Hot Only 18.

In February 2004, Red Hot Euro and Red Hot Films relaunched on the Sky EPG, expanding the network over to eight channels.

Another EPG change on 1 April 2005 led to several additions and removals. Red Hot Euro was removed and Red Hot Only 18 was moved into its former slot, while a new Red Hot network – Red Hot Rears (branded as "Red Hot R" on the Sky EPG), launched in the vacated Only 18 slot. Two of the channels – Red Hot UK Talent and Red Hot Films were renamed Red Hot Climax and Red Hot Movies, respectively.

In April 2006, Red Hot All Girl and Red Hot Movies were rebranded as Red Hot Raw and Red Hot Reality respectively, keeping the number of channels at eight. In July 2006, Red Hot Only 18 was renamed Red Hot All Girl.

On 3 April 2007, another Sky EPG change reduced the number of Red Hot channels to six with the closure and sale of the EPG slots belonging to Red Hot Climax and Red Hot Reality. Red Hot All Girl was renamed Red Hot Girl Girl, Red Hot 40+ Wives was renamed simply Red Hot 40+, and Red Hot Rears was renamed Red Hot Viewers. Red Hot Reality was relaunched on 23 August, and another change rebranded Red Hot Reality and Red Hot Wives as Red Hot Just 18 and Red Hot DD, respectively on 6 December, alongside the addition of Red Hot Fetish.

On 28 August 2008, Red Hot Raw and Red Hot Viewers closed and their EPG slots were sold off, reducing Red Hot to six channels.

On 21 May 2009, Red Hot Just 18 and Red Hot Girl Girl closed along with their sister channel Television X FFWD, and they were replaced with three chat-based channels named Filth, Cream and Skincity. On 16 July, a small change occurred with Red Hot 40+ moving into Red Hot DD's slot, while the vacated 40+ slot became Red Hot TV. In August 2009 Red Hot TV attempted to get into the record books by organizing Britain's biggest gang bang, which they named "The Great British Gang Bang". In October 2009, the network expanded to five channels once again with the addition of Red Hot Mums, replacing Filth.

At the start of 2012 eight channels were broadcast by Red Hot TV, including Red Hot Fetish and Red Hot Dirty Talk. In June, Red Hot Fetish was removed and replaced with Filth, and Red Hot TV was renamed Red Hot 18's.

Red Hot 40+ was removed from the Sky EPG in 2013, and on 7 January 2016, the number of Red Hot channels decreased from three to a single channel. Red Hot Amateur became Viewer's Wives, Red Hot Mums became simply Red Hot, and Red Hot 18s became Xtreme Filth.

== See also ==
- List of adult television channels
- Pornography in the United Kingdom
