= Ray Hammond =

British futurist

Ray Hammond is a British author and futurist.

== Selected bibliography ==
=== Fiction ===
- Emergence (2001)
- Extinction (2005)
- The Cloud (2006)

=== Non-fiction ===
- Forward 100 (1984)
- Digital Business: Surviving and Thriving In An On-Line World (1996)
- The Modern Frankenstein - Fiction Becomes Fact (1986)
- The Musician and the Micro (1983)
