= Stephen Bubb =

British politician

Sir Stephen John Limrick Bubb (born 5 November 1952) is the Founding Director and Executive Director of the Gradel Institute of Charity at New College, Oxford. Established in 2023, the Gradel Institute is the world's first institute to focus on the governance and leadership of charities, and to measure their impact both nationally and globally. The Institute aims to educate and inspire charities and other third sector organisations to embrace purposeful change through research, programmes and engagement.

Bubb was Chief Executive of the UK charity leaders' representative body, the Association of Chief Executives of Voluntary Organisations (ACEVO) from 2000 to 2016. He received a knighthood in 2011 for his services to the voluntary sector. From March 2011 to June 2011, Bubb was seconded to the Department of Health, as part of the team leading Andrew Lansley's National Health Service (NHS) "listening exercise". He has completed two major national reviews for government: one on choice and competition in the NHS in 2011 and in 2014 he produced a major review with recommendations to government of the abuse of people with learning disabilities following the scandal of Winterbourne View.

Bubb is regarded as influential within the Labour and Conservative Parties, with his longstanding advocacy of charities replacing public services chiming with both parties' policy of promoting competition and choice in areas such as health care. He has described criticisms of competition as belonging in the "last century".

== Early life and education ==
Bubb was born in Gillingham, Kent to John and Diana Bubb. He was educated at Gillingham Grammar School, and read Philosophy, Politics and Economics at Christ Church, Oxford between 1972 and 1975.

== Career ==
After briefly being a civil servant, Bubb became a Research Officer for the TGWU's Jack Jones in 1976. In 1980, he became Negotiations Officer for the National Union of Teachers, before, in 1987, becoming a lead adviser to the Association of Metropolitan Authorities in its pay negotiations.

In 1995, he became the first Director of Personnel of the National Lottery Charities Board. He became the CEO of the Association of Chief Executives of Voluntary Organisations in 2000.

Bubb was Chairman of the Adventure Capital Fund, which became the Social Investment Board from 2006 to 2016, and Chairman of Futurebuilders England in 2008.

After stepping down from ACEVO, Bubb founded Charity Futures to investigate challenges to, and provide support for, the third sector for the next generation.

In 2018, Bubb was appointed the Acting Director of the Oxford Institute of Charity; this later became the Gradel Institute of Charity, housed at New College, Oxford. At the opening of the Institute in September 2023, Bubb became the Executive Director of the Institute, which was established with the aim of publishing research to improve the strategy of governance of charities, and in curating leadership programmes for those working in the charitable sector.

== Other activities ==
Bubb was a Labour Party member of Lambeth Borough Council for Clapham Town ward from 1982, serving as chief whip for the Labour group. When the Labour group protested against rate-capping by refusing to set a rate, Bubb was among 32 Lambeth councillors who were surcharged for causing the council a financial loss by wilful misconduct. This action disqualified him from being a councillor for five years from the end of March 1986.

He spent nearly 20 years as a Youth Court Magistrate in inner London (1980-2000). He also acted on local health boards in South London (Guy's Hospital and St Thomas' Hospital) and set up an HIV centre there.

Bubb was asked by the then Prime Minister, David Cameron to review choice and competition in the National Health Service as part of the pause in the passage of the NHS reform bill in 2011, promoted by Andrew Lansley. He presented his report to a meeting of the British Cabinet and became the first third sector leader to address a meeting of the Cabinet.

In 2014, he was asked by the UK Government to review the progress that had been made in implementing promises made to close institutions for people with learning disabilities following the Winterbourne View abuse scandal that was exposed by Panorama.

His recommendations were accepted by Government but a further abuse scandal in 2019 led to Bubb denouncing the failure of government and calling for new legislation and an independent commissioner for people with learning disabilities.

Bubb has served in many non-executive roles on public bodies, including on the Honours Committee, as a Governor of St Thomas's Hospital, as Public Appointment Assessor, and as tutor for the Open University.

He is currently the Chair of Pro Terra Sancta UK, a patron of the Muslim Charity Forum and the Honorary Secretary of the Charity Housing Alliance.

== Personal life ==
Stephen Bubb has one brother, Nicholas, and two sisters, Sara and Lucy. In 2023 Stephen was married at Old Saint Paul's, Edinburgh, to Tony Vetters, his long-term partner since 1981. They live in Charlbury.

== Controversy ==
Stephen Bubb came under scrutiny in August 2013 after it was reported that his 60th birthday gathering in the House of Commons had been partly financed by his own charity, ACEVO. Despite the charity paying him a salary in excess of £100,000, he still felt it was suitable for the charity to cover some of the costs and stated "seemed just right to celebrate my 60th with a tea party in the House of Lords on Monday!"
