= Association of Chief Executives of Voluntary Organisations =

ACEVO (Association of Chief Executives of Voluntary Organisations) is a membership body for the leaders of third sector organisations in England and Wales. ACEVO has sister organisations in Scotland (ACOSVO) and Northern Ireland (CO3 Chief Officers 3rd Sector).

== Aims ==
ACEVO's vision is to see civil society leaders making the biggest possible difference. Its stated aims are to connect, develop and represent civil society leaders

== History ==
ACEVO was started in 1987 by three charity chief executives who felt isolated in their positions, and wanted to establish a networking group of third sector leaders. Its original name was ACENVO – Association of Chief Executives of National Voluntary Organisations – but its membership now encompasses the leaders of charities and not-for-profits from small, community-based groups, ambitious medium-sized organisations, and well known national and international not-for-profits. Current chief executive Jane Ide OBE took over in 2022 following previous CEOs Vicky Browning OBE (2017–2022), Sir Stephen Bubb (2000–2016) and Dorothy Dalton (1987–2000). ACEVO celebrated its 30th anniversary in 2017.

== Membership ==
ACEVO's membership is primarily drawn from England and Wales, (third sector leaders in Scotland or Northern Ireland can join ACOSVO or CO3 respectively). Full members are CEOs (or equivalent) at charities and social enterprises. Associate membership is offered to anyone with an interest in sector leadership, including chairs and trustees (but excluding for-profit organisations), and aspiring CEOs join as senior leader members. Private organisations wishing to support and work with the sector may become part of the network as commercial partners. It has over 1,750 members and a staff of 16 FTE. ACOSVO has over 750 members.

Membership fees are graduated by the turnover of the organisation the CEO represents. Members join primarily for peer support and professional development through networking, training and events.

== Influencing ==
Together with New Philanthropy Capital, ACEVO developed and pioneered the case for Full Cost Recovery, which states that third sector organisations should cost their work robustly, including a relevant share of overheads and "core costs", and that the funding they receive from government should be sustainable. The principle of full cost recovery, "ensuring [that] publicly-funded services are not subsidised by charitable donations or volunteers", was accepted by HM Treasury in 2002 and embraced by the Gershon Report of 2004. Full cost recovery is endorsed by the UK's National Lottery for calculating payments for Community Fund projects, and by the Arts Council England: both of these organisations signpost funding applicants to make use of ACEVO guidance.

== Criticism ==
ACEVO has been criticised by other voluntary sector organisations for taking a political stance in favour of charities assisting with the privatisation of public services such as healthcare and prisons. The National Council for Voluntary Organisations criticised a 2005 ACEVO report warning it could "warp public perception of the role of the sector".
