= Steven Dupler =

Steven Dupler is a U.S.-based writer, producer and director and a pioneer in high definition television (HDTV). An early member of REBO HD Studio, which in 1986 became the first High Definition production company in North America, he has created, produced or directed more than 100 HD projects, including numerous industry “firsts.” These include “Rave On,” the first HD-originated documentary film ever to be nominated in competition at the Sundance Film Festival, http://history.sundance.org/films/1325, as well as Paradise Bound, another HD-originated documentary short which was screened the same year at Sundance (1996); “New York: On the Edge,” the first HDTV verité documentary series, which has aired in more than 35 countries; and “Manhattan Music Magazine,” the first HDTV music concert series.

In addition to Sundance, Dupler's work has been honored by numerous international film and video festivals, including New York, Tokyo, Kyoto, Dallas and the International Electronic Cinema Festival, as well as by such international broadcasting organizations as the IBC and the ITS. In 1995, Dupler was honored with a diploma by the United Nations' UNESCO for outstanding work in support of tolerance for his film, "Outside Society," about the homeless community then living in the Amtrak tunnel under New York City's West Side Highway, as well as various homeless enclaves elsewhere in Manhattan.

Dupler has created documentaries and other programs for “60 Minutes”/CBS News; PBS; Discovery/The Learning Channel; Court TV, CNBC; ESPN; NHK; MTV and TBS, among others. His work covers a broad range: music videos and concerts; a piece about troubled former baseball superstar Darryl Strawberry for "60 Minutes"; "A House Divided," a feature documentary that goes deep inside radical racial separatist groups in Florida and Brooklyn, NY; profiles of biker gangs, California low-riders, a transsexual teenager, and gay and lesbian rodeo riders; documentaries of the lives of Timothy McVeigh, Pablo Escobar and Russian mafiya godfather Semyon Mogilievich; "Broadway Remembers," an oral history of Broadway, the longest and oldest continuous street in the world; and a two-part documentary for CNBC about the history of Wall Street, called "The Great Game," among many other projects.

A former print journalist, he has served as Senior Editor of Billboard magazine; Editor-in-Chief of UK based International Musician magazine; and a reporter for the New York Post. In 2004, Dupler worked with Walter Cronkite on Mr. Cronkite's weekly nationally syndicated newspaper column, and also wrote and produced Mr. Cronkite's segments for an MTV “Choose or Lose” election year special, titled "Work It!"

Dupler is currently the producer and writer of the PBS television series "Legends of Jazz with Ramsey Lewis," the first weekly jazz talk/performance series to run on broadcast television in more than 40 years. He is also currently writing and co-producing an upcoming seven-hour documentary series titled "RECORDING: The History of Recorded Music," executive-produced and co-hosted by Quincy Jones; legendary producer Phil Ramone; and music and internet entrepreneur Larry Rosen -- http://recordingthehistory.com/video/
