= New! =

new!
- Editor: Karen Cross
- Categories: Celebrity magazine
- Frequency: weekly
- Total circulation: 246,962 (June-Dec 2015)
- First issue: March 2003
- Company: Reach plc
- Country: United Kingdom
- Language: English
- Website: new-magazine.co.uk

New! is a British weekly magazine, specialising in celebrity news and is published by Reach plc, which also oversees OK! magazine, the Daily Mirror, Daily Express and Daily Star.

== Profile ==
New! was first published in March 2003. Its slogan is, "if it's hot, it's here".

It features columnists Peter Andre and Kerry Katona. A new issue is published every Tuesday.
