= Yellow cab (stereotype) =

Derogatory term

Yellow cab (イエローキャブ, Ierō Kyabu) is a disparaging term for Japanese women who travel overseas or to foreign enclaves in Japan seeking to meet foreign men.

The term combines the use of "yellow", a color/racial classification category for people of East Asian origin, and the image of a yellow cab which can be "ridden at any time".

The term was spread to Japan by Shōko Ieda's 1991 book Yellow Cab, and was quickly appropriated by the Japanese media as a way of sensationalizing and censuring the women's behaviour. Later, Yellow Cab was exposed as a fraud, and Japanese media reports were criticized.

== Social context ==
Women described as "yellow cabs" can often be observed in so-called "border regions" consisting of highly transient, ethnically and culturally mixed populations. One scholar studying the "yellow cab" phenomenon listed the Roppongi district of Tokyo, United States Forces Japan bases in locations such as Yokosuka, Yokota, Misawa, Iwakuni, Sasebo, and Okinawa as possible locations in Japan, and Hawaii, New York City, and the West Coast in the United States.

Sources disagree as to the question of power in these relationships. One argument analyses the phenomenon in terms of consumer patterns: the women are in the financially superior position due to the strength of the Japanese yen and their own disposable income, and are using their power to purchase sex; one such woman even described her foreign boyfriends as "pets". The opposing argument puts the phenomenon in the context of a larger "romanticization and eroticization" of the West and specifically of English speakers by Japanese women, and asserts that it is actually the Western men in such relationships who have power. However, the phenomenon is not limited to the West; some women also seek out local tour guides in Bali and Thailand as "holiday lovers".

Women engaged in these activities sometimes assert that it is no more than a female reflection of the much larger phenomenon of Japanese men's sex tours to foreign countries; some scholars agree with this self-assessment, bluntly referring to such women as "female sex tourists". In terms of the women and their relation to Japanese society, some authors describe the women's taking-on of foreign partners as "socially, economically, and politically liberating" and a threat to Japanese men; others point out that the pursuit of foreign men was neither a permanent rejection of Japanese patriarchy nor of Japanese men themselves, and that many women engaged in such relationships eventually went on to marry Japanese men.

== Controversies ==
There was coverage of the "yellow cab" phenomenon as early as 1987, but public attention to it received a major boost from Shōko Ieda's 1991 book Yellow Cab, which featured interviews with and reporting on young Japanese women overseas. Her research assistant George Sarratt later denounced major portions of the book as fraudulent. Television broadcasts on the phenomenon especially focused on relations between black men and Japanese women, and the perceived danger of being infected with AIDS; Japan's TV Asahi aired a segment on the subject in 1992 which included several staged scenes; Tokyo Broadcasting System followed up with a 90-minute documentary in 1993.

The use of the term by Japanese men has been described as "reverse orientalism". However, the controversy itself was used by women's media to engage in critique of Japanese male behaviours; such critique was often characterised by "relentless denigration" of Japanese men, as in Makiko Iizuka's 1993 book, The Guys who Can't Even Hitch a Ride on a Cab. In contrast, women labelled as "yellow cabs" have also been known to reappropriate the term as a mark of pride; in particular, Amy Yamada is "notorious" for using her work to "flaunt" her image as a "yellow cab", a trend that was apparent in her work even before the emergence of the "yellow cab" stereotype, as in her 1985 book Bedtime Eyes, which won that year's Bungei Prize. Japanese hip hop artist Hime, the self-described voice of the "Japanese doll", also turns the stereotype on its head, stating that being a "yellow cab" means that the woman is in the "driver's seat".

In response to the negative media coverage, Japanese female professionals in the New York City area organised the "Group to think about yellow cabs" (イエローキャブを考える会, Ierō Kyabu wo Kangaeru Kai); they asserted that the image of Japanese women overseas had been damaged by the media and that the phenomenon was nowhere near as widespread as the media coverage attempted to portray it to be, and sought to combat the negative coverage. The protest group also questioned whether the term was truly widespread in the United States, as the documentaries claimed; one telephone survey of 200 people they conducted in the New York area did not find a single individual familiar with the use of the term "yellow cab" in this sense.

The group continued to be active until late 1993; they were later criticised for their "legacy of denial and disavowal of the possibility of Japanese women's racialized desire for foreign men". Scholars studying their activities described their attempts to deny or downplay the phenomenon as an "image battle", and one which they lost; women returning to Japan from studying or working overseas often reported that they suffered insulting insinuations about their sexual behaviour. The reporting on the phenomenon in Japanese media was generally supplanted in the mid-1990s by a "new panic" regarding women's sexuality, specifically the enjo kōsai (compensated dating) phenomenon.

== See also ==
- Amejo
- Asian fetish
- Colonial mentality
- Internalized racism
- Sarong party girl
- Stereotypes of East and Southeast Asians
