= Tony Livesey =

British journalist and broadcaster (born 1964)

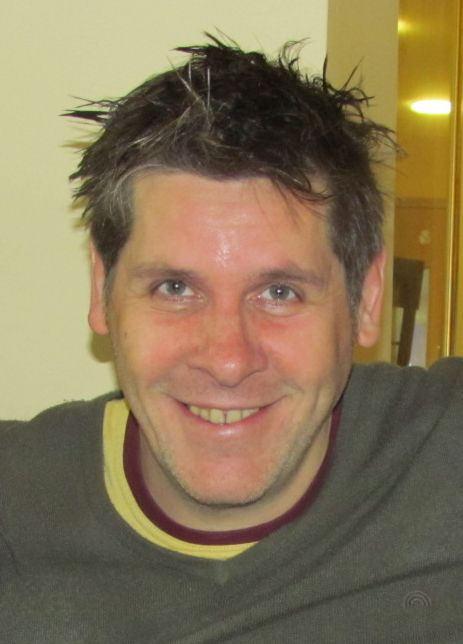
- Livesey in 2011
- Born: Anthony Livesey; 11 January 1964 (age 62); Burnley, Lancashire, England
- Occupations: Journalist and presenter

Anthony Livesey (born 11 January 1964, in Burnley, Lancashire) is a British journalist and broadcaster who formerly presented on BBC Radio 5 Live.

== Early life ==
Livesey was born in Burnley, Lancashire, and lived in nearby Nelson during the early part of his life. He attended St George's Junior School, Vaughan Street. His mother died aged 44, when he was 13 years old.

== Career ==
=== Newspapers ===
Livesey began his career with the Nelson Leader and then worked in the Middle East with Sam Sloan at the Gulf News in Dubai. Returning to his native Lancashire, he worked at the Lancashire Evening Telegraph before spending 18 years with Sport Newspapers where he was editor-in-chief and managing director of the Daily Sport and Sunday Sport newspapers. Livesey's 1998 book Babes, Booze, Orgies and Aliens: The Inside Story of Sport Newspapers recounts some of his experiences working at the organization.

=== Radio and television ===
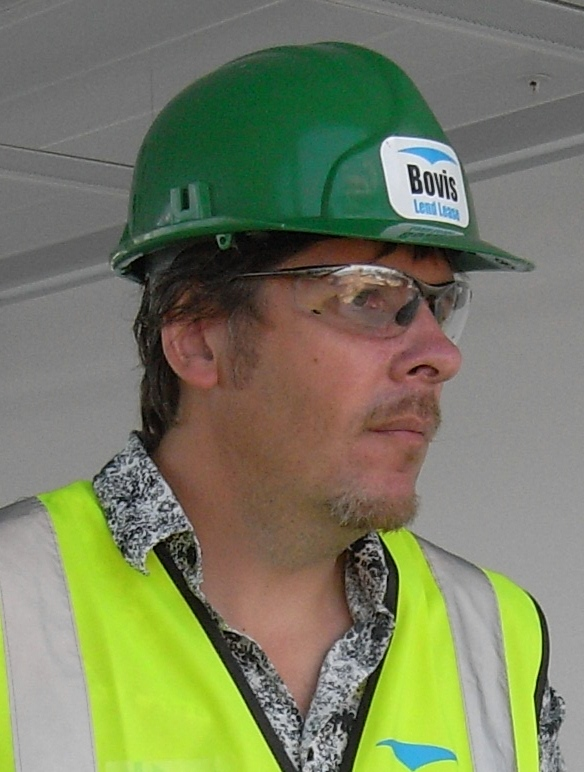
Livesey in 2009

After resigning in August 2006 from the Sport newspapers, he joined the BBC, presenting a Saturday morning show on BBC Radio Lancashire. He then moved on to host the Breakfast show on the station.

Livesey presented the one-off documentary Crumpet: A Very British Sex Symbol, which was transmitted on BBC Two on 28 December 2005 and a year later he presented another programme related to this called Beefcake: A Very British Sex Symbol, which was also transmitted on BBC Two on 27 December 2006.

Livesey also had a brief stint as a quiz show host in 2004 for the BBC. The show was called Traitor and ran on BBC Two, from 9 to 13 February 2004 (5 episodes in 1 series).

On 11 January 2010, Livesey started to present the late night show on BBC Radio 5 Live. Livesey's late night show on 26 September 2011 was the very first to be presented from MediaCity. He was also a stand-in presenter for Shelagh Fogarty and Victoria Derbyshire on their mid-morning shows and occasionally hosted the Breakfast programme. Livesey left the late night show in April 2013 to host the Weekend Breakfast programme and then the weekday Drive programme.

Alongside seven years presenting on BBC North West Tonight, as well as deputising for regular host Roger Johnson, Livesey also presented the North West edition of the BBC's regional football show Late Kick Off and the North West edition of the regional programme Inside Out. Livesey has appeared on Have I Got News for You, What The Papers Say and Never Mind the Buzzcocks, all on the BBC and was the culture reporter on The One Show for a year.

On 9 June 2026, Livesey announced that he was stepping back from his BBC Radio 5 Live programme after being named in an investigation by the BBC's Panorama and The Times as having introduced a woman to then Sport Newspapers owner David Sullivan in 1999. Sullivan was accused of sexual misconduct by several women, which he denied. On 3 August 2026, it was announced that Livesey had left the broadcaster completely.
