= Han Seung-yeon =

South Korean singer and actress (born 1988)

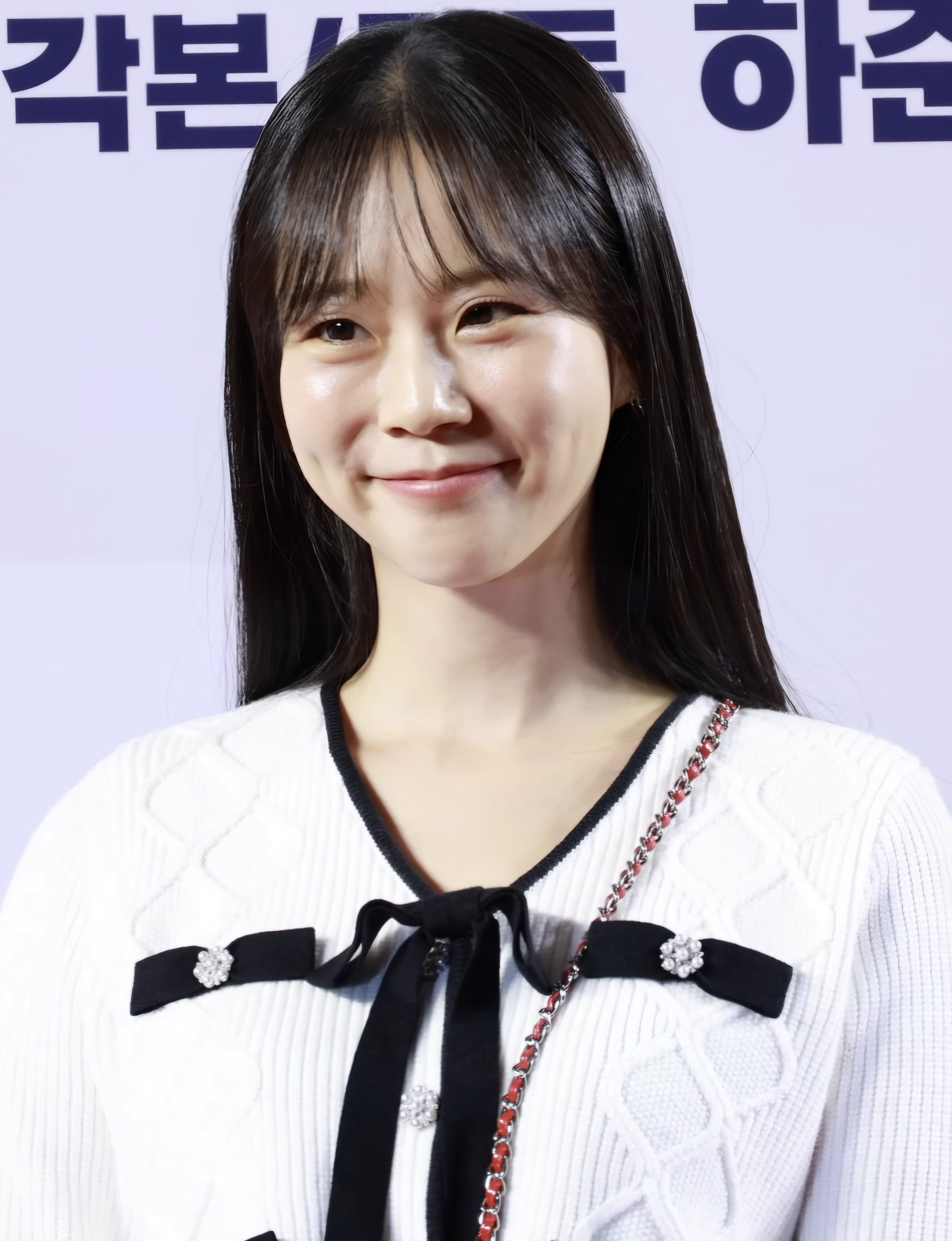
- Han in 2024
- Born: Han Seung-yeon; July 24, 1988 (age 38); Yeongdeungpo District, Seoul, South Korea
- Education: Kyung Hee University
- Occupations: Singer; actress
- Years active: 1993–present
- Agent: AER Entertainment
- Musical career
- Genre: K-pop
- Instrument: Vocals
- Years active: 2007–present
- Label: DSP
- Member of: Kara

Korean name
- Hangul: 한승연
- RR: Han Seungyeon
- MR: Han Sŭngyŏn

Han Seung-yeon (Korean: 한승연; born July 24, 1988), known mononymously as Seungyeon, is a South Korean singer and actress. She is best known as the vocalist of the South Korean girl group Kara, and for her role in Hello, My Twenties!.

== Life and career ==
=== 1993–2007: Early life and career beginnings ===
Han Seung-yeon was born on July 24, 1988, in Yeongdeungpo District, Seoul, South Korea. She made her acting debut as a child actress in a bit part in Dear Ends (1993), Summer Showers (1995) and Star in My Heart (1997). She later left South Korea to study at Tenafly High School in New Jersey, United States. However, she withdrew from high school mid-course to pursue a singing career. After returning to South Korea, she debuted as a member of girl group Kara on March 29, 2007. During her time with the group, she passed a high school qualification exam, the College Scholastic Ability Test, and was accepted by Kyung Hee University, majoring in theater and film.

=== 2007–08: Debut and solo activities ===
Seungyeon debuted as main vocalist of Kara on M Countdown on March 29, 2007.

She was the VJ for MSL Break from 2007 to 2008. She replaced Tiffany of Girls' Generation as co-host of Boys and Girls Music Countdown in June 2008 with Kim Hye-sung, and later with actor Kim Soo-hyun. Their segment ended on May 8, 2009. From October to December 2008, she was part of the cast of the MBC Every 1 reality show I Need a Family – Season 2, where a group of celebrities would live life as a family, consisting of a father, mother, son and daughter. She also became part of MBC's entertainment news show Section TV, as a "pop correspondent", debuting on November 21, 2008.

=== 2009–present: Continued solo activities, Kara disbandment and label changes ===
Han was featured on rapper Nassun's single "Come to Play", which was released in March 2009, and was featured on the soundtrack for the movie Why Did You Come to My House? (2009), releasing her first solo song entitled "Miracle". In October 2009, she became part of the "Dream Team Girl Group" named 4Tomorrow for Samsung's campaign Samsung Anycall. Their digital single "Tomorrow" was released on October 6, and the official music video for their single was released on the October 12, starring actor Lee Dong-gun.

In 2010, she recorded the song "Super Star" for the soundtrack of the KBS2 drama Mary Stayed Out All Night. The same year, she became a host of MBC Every1's I Love Pet alongside fellow member Kang Ji-young. In 2011, she recorded the song "Because of Love" for the soundtrack of the SBS drama Warrior Baek Dong-soo. In July 2011, she became a co-host of SBS's Animal Farm.

Han released her first solo single "Guilty" on November 30, 2012, along with its music video. She had a performance of the single on MBC's Music Core on December 15.

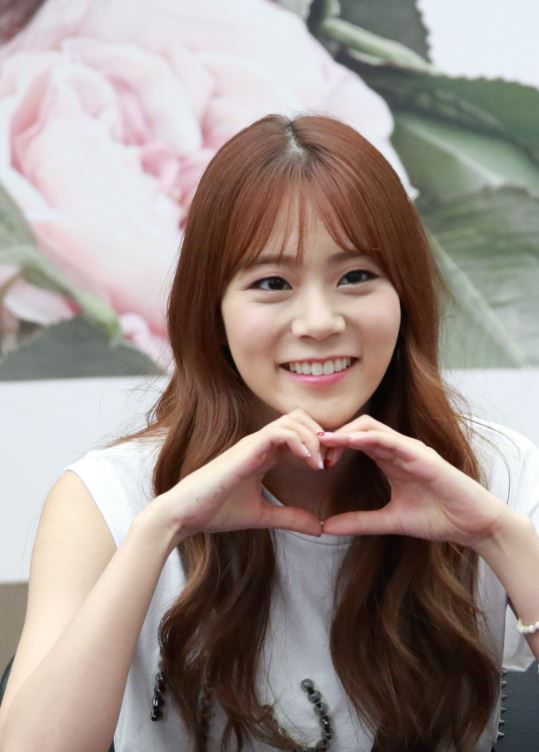
Han in May 2015

In 2013, Han appeared as the protagonist's younger counterpart in the daily drama Pure Love (2013). Then in her first major supporting role, Han portrayed Choi Suk-bin in the period drama Jang Ok-jung, Living by Love (2013). In 2014, starred in the weekend drama Jang Bo-ri is Here!. The same year, she played her first leading role in the cable series Her Lovely Heels. Also, from 2013 to 2014, Han and fellow member Park Gyu-ri served as hosts of the music program The Show.

In January 2016, Kara was disbanded after Seungyeon, Park Gyuri and Goo Hara decided not to renew their contract. She later signed a contract with J Wide Company in the same year. In May, Han was cast in the omnibus web film Bugs Attack. In July 2016, Han starred in the coming-of-age youth drama Hello, My Twenties!. In October 2016, Han was cast in a short film titled Frame in Love.

In 2017, Han starred in JTBC's web drama Last Minute Romance. She also reprised her role in the sequel of Hello, My Twenties.

In 2018, Han switched over to Inyeon Entertainment, and was cast in the fantasy romance drama About Time. She then took on the leading role in travel romance drama Twelve Nights.

In April 2020, Han signed with new agency YGX Entertainment.

In 2021, Han appeared in comedy horror film Show Me the Ghost as Ye-ji. She won Fantastic Actor Jury's Special Mention Award for her performance at 25th Bucheon International Fantastic Film Festival.

== Discography ==
=== EPs ===
Title	Album details	Peak positions		Sales
Title	Album details	KOR	JPN	Sales
Uchuu (宇宙)	Released: January 18, 2017 (Japan); Label: Sony Music Records; Format: CD, Digital download	—	15	JPN: 5,657+
Aozora e (青空へ)	Released: January 30, 2019 (Japan); Label: AKATSUKI label; Format: CD, Digital download	—	—	
"—" denotes releases that did not chart or were not released in that region.

=== Singles ===
==== As lead artist ====
Title	Year	Peak positions	Album	Ref.
Title	Year	KOR	Album	Ref.
"Gijeog" (Miracle)	2009	—	On the Way Home OST	
"Super Star"	2010	96	Mary Stayed Out All Night OST	
"Salang Ttaemune" (Because Of Love)	2011	—	Warrior Baek Dong-soo OST	
"Guilty"	2012	155	Kara Solo Collection	
"Honja Salanghalkkayo" (Should I Love Alone)	2014	—	Her Lovely Heels OST	
"Hello" (with Gyuri)	2014	—	Blade Man OST	
"Du Salam" (Duet) (with Kim Soo Hyung)	2014	—	Musical Fool Victor OST	
"Jeo Byeolkkaji Deullige" (Can Be Heard From The Stars) (with Kim Da-hyun)	2014	—	Guitar and Hot Pants OST	
"Geuttaen Alji Moshaessnabwa" (From Now) (with Lee Sang Gon from Noel)	2015	—	Non-album singles	
"Geuaen Na" (U&I)	2016	—	Non-album singles	
"Jal Itni" (Do You Remember?)	2016	—	Non-album singles	
"Sigan-ui Ondo" (The Temperature of Time)	2018	—	At The Moment : When Time Stopped OST	
"I Love Me"	2019	—	Non-album single	
"Annyeong tto Annyeong" (Goodbye Again Goodbye)	2019	—	Perfume OST	

==== As featured artist ====
Title	Year	Album	Ref.
"Nolleowa" (Come To Play) (Nassun feat. Seungyeon)	2009	Nassun Happyface	
"Tomorrow" (4 Tomorrow (Seungyeon, Gain, Uee and Hyuna)	2009	Dugeundugeun Tomorrow	
"Talk About Love" (W Foundation Campaign with various artists)	2014	non-album single	

=== Guest appearances ===
Year	Title	Album	Ref.
2010	"Bingeul Bingeul" (Round and Round) (No Brain feat. SeungYeon, Nicole Jung, Gyuri)	MBC Music Travel Lalala Live Vol.11	
2014	"Cheos Salang" (First Love) (with Gyuri)	DSP Special Album "White Letter"	

== Filmography ==
=== Film ===
Year	Title	Role	Notes	Ref.
1993	Dead Ends	—N/a		
1995	Summer Showers			
2013	Epic	Mary Katherine (M. K.)	Korean dub	
2013	Kara The Animation	Herself	Japanese dub	
2017	Frame in Love	Ji Seon		
2021	Show Me the Ghost	Ye-ji	Fantastic Actor Jury's Special Mention Award	
2023	My Worst Neighbor	Hong La-ni		

=== Television series ===
Year	Title	Notes	Ref.
1997	Star in My Heart	Orphan girl	
2010	More Charming by the Day	Cameo	
2011	Urakara	Seung-yeon	
2012	Salamander Guru and The Shadows	Cameo	
2013	A Bit of Love	Kim Sun-mi	
2013	Jang Ok-jung, Living by Love	Choi Musuri	
2014	Her Lovely Heels	Shin Ji-hoo	
2014	Jang Bo-ri Is Here!	Lee Ga-eul	
2014	Secret Love	Ji-hye	
2014	Guitar and Hot Pants	Anna	
2016–17	Hello, My Twenties!	Jung Ye-eun	
2017	Last Minute Romance	Baek Se	
2018	About Time	Jeon Sang-hee	
2018	Twelve Nights	Han Yoo-Kyung	
2021	Life Derm She	Go Ri-a	
2024	Lovely Runner	DJ Hamster	
2025	The Scandal of Chun Hwa	Ji Won	

=== Hosting ===
Year	Title	Notes	Ref.
2007	Han Seung Yeon MSL Break		
2008	I Need a Family – Season 2		
2008	Inkigayo	Special MC for episodes 512–515 with Eun Ji-won and Leeteuk	
2008–2009	Boys & Girls Music Countdown		
2010	I Love Pet	with Kang Ji-young	
2011	Animal Farm		
2013–2014	The Show	with Park Gyu-ri	
2020–2021	Pet Vitamin		

== Audiobook ==
- Victor the Fool by Joachim de Posada, voice of Laura

== Awards and nominations ==
Name of the award ceremony, year presented, category, nominee of the award, and the result of the nomination
Award ceremony	Year	Category	Nominee / Work	Result	Ref.
Bucheon International Fantastic Film Festival	2021	Fantastic Actor Jury's Special Mention	Show Me the Ghost	Won	
Cable TV Broadcasting Awards	2015	Best Couple Award (With Hong Jong-hyun)	Her Lovely Heels	Won	
Korea Drama Awards	2016	Hallyu Star Award	Hello, My Twenties!	Won	
