= David Wayman =

English actor (born 1988)

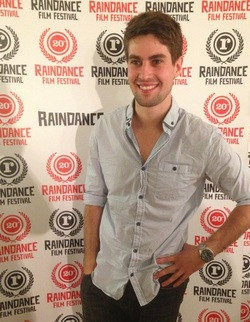
- Wayman arriving at the Raindance Film Festival
- Born: David Place; 27 January 1988 (age 38); London, England
- Occupation: Actor
- Website: http://www.david-wayman.com

David Wayman (born 27 January 1988) is an English actor.

== Early life ==
Wayman (born David Place) grew up in Enfield, London and attended Lochinver House School and St. Columba's College.

Aged 18, he joined The Rifles as a reservist.

== Career ==
Wayman trained at East 15 Acting School in Loughton.

Early work saw him taking a lead role in Martin Gooch's After Death opposite Ben Shockley, Leslie Phillips and Paul Freeman, before playing a leading role in Knight Knight in 2012.

In 2014, he was featured in the Evening Standard for having lead roles in five films at Cannes Film Festival.

In 2014, he starred in Wandering Rose, released by Entertainment One and Shoreline Entertainment's Art Ache.

== Filmography ==
=== Film ===
Year	Film	Role	Notes
2009	An Education	Man in Café	Uncredited
2012	Angry Nazi Zombies	George	
2012	Knight Knight	Sir Gilbert	
2012	After Death	Tom	
2012	Art Of Darkness	Steve	
2012	The Search For Simon	The Non-German Soldier	
2013	The Dead Inside	Pte. Paul Bradburn	Also military adviser
2014	For the Evening	James?	Also writer/co-director
2014	Wandering Rose	Theo	
2015	I am the Doorway	Dennis	
2015	Send in the clowns	David	
2015	Art Ache	Alex	
2016	Capsule	Harry Lyndhurst	
2016	Tango One	Charlie	
2019	Benny Loves You	Phil	
2022	Graphic Desires	Frank	

=== Television ===
Year	Programme	Role	Notes
2013	JFK: Seven Days That Made a President	Patrick McMahon	
2014	Harold Shipman	Young Shipman	2 episodes
2015	That's English	Danny	3 Seasons
2016	Stormbird	Roy Brown	
