= Sunday Sport =

British tabloid newspaper

- A 2021 example of the tabloid's satirical headlines
- Type: Sunday newspaper
- Format: Tabloid
- Owner: David Sullivan
- Publisher: Sunday Sport (2011) Ltd (original publisher Sport Newspapers)
- Editor: Nick Appleyard
- Founded: 1986
- Headquarters: City View House 5 Union Street, Ardwick, Manchester, M12 4JD, United Kingdom

The Sunday Sport is a British tabloid newspaper founded by David Sullivan in 1986. It mainly publishes images of topless female glamour models, and is also known for publishing sensationalised, fictionalised, and satirical content alongside celebrity gossip and sports coverage. A sister daily title, the Daily Sport, was launched in 1991. In 2007, Sullivan sold both titles for £40 million to Sport Media Group; following declining circulation, that company entered administration on 1 April 2011. Shortly afterwards, Sullivan reacquired the Sunday Sport for £50,000, while the Daily Sport went online-only under separate ownership.

As of January 2026, the tabloid publishes three times a week as the Sunday Sport (Sundays), the Midweek Sport (Wednesdays), and the Weekend Sport (Fridays). The tabloid was previously available in mainstream retailers such as Tesco and The Co-op, but following the decline of lads' mags and Page 3 from the late 2000s, it has become available only in independent newsagents. It remains the only remaining British tabloid to feature nudity. Its website was taken offline in 2025, due to the Online Safety Act requirement that it provide age verification for users.

== History ==
Founded by David Sullivan, the Sunday Sport first appeared on newsstands on 14 September 1986. It quickly became known for its outlandish and farcical content, with headlines such as "Adolf Hitler Was A Woman", "Aliens Turned Our Son Into A Fish Finger", and "Donkey Robs Bank". Its editors have included Michael Gabbert, Tony Livesey, Paul Carter, and Nick Appleyard. A sister daily title, the Daily Sport, launched in 1991. Livesey's 1998 book Babes, Booze, Orgies and Aliens: The Inside Story of Sport Newspapers offers an insider's perspective on the tabloid's first decade.

The Sunday Sport capitalised on the popularity of The Sun's Page 3 feature by making sexualised content its primary focus. Topless glamour models were printed across multiple pages and a "nipple count" was published to highlight how many exposed breasts the issue featured. The tabloid courted controversy by featuring 15-year-old aspiring glamour models in scantily clad poses, counting down the days until it could legally show them topless on their 16th birthdays, as it did with Linsey Dawn McKenzie and Hannah Claydon, among others.

The Sunday Sport's circulation reached an all-time high of 167,473 in 2005, and Sullivan sold his Sunday Sport and Daily Sport titles in 2007 for £40 million. Circulation declined markedly thereafter, with the new owner, Sport Media Group, withdrawing the titles from the newspaper industry's monthly circulation audit in 2009. In the same year, Sullivan stepped in to save Sport Media Group with a £1.68 million loan. The company entered administration on 1 April 2011, at which point publisher Richard Desmond refused to continue printing the titles because of outstanding debts. The Sunday Sport returned to newsstands several weeks later on 8 May 2011, after Sullivan reacquired it for £50,000. The Daily Sport was sold off separately to Grant Miller.

Sullivan's new company, Sunday Sport (2011) Limited, continued to publish the Sunday Sport as a single weekly title until 2013, when it added a Wednesday edition, the Midweek Sport. As of June 2025, the paper appears three times a week as the Sunday Sport (Sundays), the Midweek Sport (Wednesdays), and the Weekend Sport (Fridays).

In July 2025, the online version of the Sunday Sport was taken down due to the Online Safety Act requirement that it provide age verification for users accessing the service. A message posted online encouraged readers to buy physical copies from newsagents.

=== Controversies ===
The tabloid contains extensive advertising for sexual services, mainly adult telephone chat lines. In 2016, the Advertising Standards Authority banned sexually explicit advertisements for chat lines from the back page of the Sunday Sport over concerns that children could easily see them.

== See also ==
- Sport Newspapers
