= Show Me the Ghost =

2021 South Korean comedy horror film

- Official release poster
- Hangul: 쇼미더고스트
- RR: Syo mi deo goseuteu
- MR: Syo mi tŏ kosŭt'ŭ
- Directed by: Kim Eun-kyoung
- Screenplay by: Kim Eun-kyoung
- Produced by: Choi Ji-yeon
- Starring: Han Seung-yeon; Kim Hyun-mok; Hong Seung-bum
- Cinematography: Jung Gui-ho
- Edited by: Son Yeon-ji
- Music by: Kim In-young
- Production companies: Indy Story Co., Ltd
- Distributed by: Indy Story
- Release dates: July 10, 2021 (BIFAN); September 9, 2021 (South Korea)
- Running time: 83 minutes
- Country: South Korea
- Language: Korean

Show Me the Ghost (Korean: 쇼미더고스트) is a 2021 South Korean comedy horror film, written and directed by Kim Eun-kyoung and starring Han Seung-yeon, Kim Hyun-mok and Hong Seung-bum. The film depicts the story of two job seeking best friends Ho-du and Yeji, whose dreams and hopes have been ruined. It was premiered at 25th Bucheon International Fantastic Film Festival on July 10 and was theatrically released on September 9, 2021.

== Synopsis ==
This self-exorcism comedy of two best friends of 20 years, Yeji (Han Seung-yeon) and Hodu (Kim Hyun-mok) has creepy horror. Both the friends are seeking jobs and need a house to rent. Then they get a fully furnished house with a low deposit and low monthly rent. To their dismay they find a ghost living in the house. They have no money and no place to go, so they try self-exorcism with the help of a self proclaimed exorcist.

== Cast ==
- Han Seung-yeon as Yeji, a ten-year-old trainee
- Kim Hyun-mok as Ho-du, a convenience store part-timer
- Hong Seung-bum as Kidu, an exorcist

== Release ==
The film was invited at 25th Bucheon International Fantastic Film Festival in Korean Fantastic features section. It had its premiere in the festival on July 10, 2021. It was theatrically released on September 9, 2021.

=== Home media ===
The film is available for streaming on video on demand service at IPTV and digital cable TV from September 23, 2021.

== Reception ==
Kim So-mi writing for Cine21 said, that the film has "charm of a complex genre interwoven with horror elements and comedy." Kim felt that the director Kim Eun-kyung's film "flows in an erratic and pleasant twist from beginning to end." Kim liking the characterization in the film wrote, "A special attraction is the harmony of characters that create psychological intimacy. Kim concluded, "Both horror and comedy have a bland feel, but the development that gradually sharpens the senses of justice, solidarity, and friendship gives off a pleasant warmth."

== Awards ==
Year	Award	Category	Recipient	Result	Ref.
2021	25th Bucheon International Fantastic Film Festival	Korean Fantastic: Fantastic Actor in a feature	Kim Hyun-mok	Won	
2021	25th Bucheon International Fantastic Film Festival	Fantastic Actor Jury's Special Mention	Han Seung-yeon	Won	
2021	25th Bucheon International Fantastic Film Festival	Nonghyup Award (distribution award)	Kim Eun-kyeong	Won	
