= Martin Gooch =

British filmmaker (born 1972)

Martin Gooch is a British filmmaker, who directed and shot many comedy shorts. His first feature film Death which premiered at Sci-Fi-London 2012 in the UK and was a 2012 finalist for Hollywood's Feel Good Film Festival in the US. He was born on 6 September 1972 in St. Albans, England.

== Career ==
After writing and directing several award-winning short films, including The Orgasm Raygun and Arthur's Amazing Things, both of which featured the British actor Leslie Phillips as the narrator,

Gooch also directed Hollyoaks for Channel 4 and Doctors for BBC1, One of his episodes won the Best Onscreen Chemistry award (2007) ITV Soap Awards. Hollyoaks won Best Soap at the ITV Soap Awards during his tenure, after which he then went on to direct the BAFTA-winning and EMMY-nominated Spooks Interactive.

His debut feature film Death (2012), which won Best Director, features Linal Haft, Emily Booth, Leslie Phillips, Nick Moran, David Wayman, Sarah Jayne Dunn, Ben Shockley and Brooke Burfitt and features music from Roger Taylor of Queen and Paul Humphreys of OMD.

His second feature film The Search for Simon premièred at the BFI Sci-Fi London Film Festival 2013, and went on to win several awards including Best Film at the Boston Sci-Fi Film Festival. It stars Carol Cleveland, Sophie Aldred, Chase Masterson and Simon Jones, as well as Noeleen Comiskey and Millie Reeves, with Gooch in the lead role.

The Gatehouse, his third feature, was picked up for distribution by Lionsgate and won Best Film at the London Independent Film Festival in 2016. In 2017, 25 years after his first visit to Modoc County, California in 1992, working for the US Forest Service, at the age of 19. Gooch returned to Modoc, to shoot his fourth feature film, Atomic Apocalypse (aka Black Flowers). It was filmed on location in Montana and North California. It had its world premiere at Sitges International Film Festival in 2018 and won Best Sci-Fi Director at World Fest-Houston; it went on to win numerous other awards and nominations.

In 2018, Gooch was a winner with the Trinity Challenge backed by ARRI Media and Directors UK and wrote and directed the one-shot short film, A Midwinter Night's Dream, starring Michael McKell, filmed all in one shot using the ARRI Trinity Stabilisation system won Best Fantasy Film at the London Independent Film Festival.

Other notable names he has directed include William Mark McCullough, Paul Freeman, Kevin McNally, Linsey Dawn McKenzie and Emily Booth. He is a two time BBC New Director award winner, with short films screened all over the world including Cannes, Edinburgh, London and also on the BBC, ITV, Channel 4 and Channel 5.

Gooch's short films include Don't Even Think It! (written by Jasper Fforde and starring Pippa Hinchley, Miranda Hart and Edward Rawle Hicks) and The Gravity of Belief (starring Alexandria Beck and Paul Ready), which was nominated for best film at the 5th London Short Film Festival, Rushes Soho Shorts Film Festival.

Gooch has a master's degree in screenwriting from The University of the Arts London, and is working on a TV series based on the legendary Fighting Fantasy gamebook series with original creator Ian Livingstone.

Gooch currently lives in London, England.

== Works ==
- The Remarkable Mr. Root (1995)
- The Orgasm Raygun (1998)
- Arthur's Amazing Thing (2002)
- Eddie's Sticky End (2003)
- Don't Even Think It! (2006)
- The Gravity of Belief (2008)
- After Death (2012)
- The Search for Simon (2013)
- The Gatehouse (2015)
- Atomic Apocalypse (2019)
- A Midwinter Night's Dream (2018)
- The Dragon Detective (2025)
- Argh and the Quest for the Golden Dragon Skull (2026)
- A Night of a Thousand Vampires (2022)
- Darkheart Manor (2022)
