= 25th Bucheon International Fantastic Film Festival =

Film festival in Bucheon South Korea

- Official poster
- Opening film: Till We Meet Again
- Closing film: The Medium
- Location: Bucheon, South Korea
- Founded: 1997
- Awards: Best of Bucheon
- Hosted by: BIFAN Organizing Committee
- No. of films: 257
- Festival date: Opening: July 8, 2021; Closing: July 18, 2021
- Website: BIFAN 2021 Fact Sheet

Bucheon International Fantastic Film Festival
- 26th 24th

The 25th Bucheon International Fantastic Film Festival (Korean: 제25회 부천국제판타스틱영화제), an international film festival held in Bucheon, South Korea, took place from 8 to 18 July 2021, it featured 257 films from 47 countries. The film festival due to the impact of the COVID-19 is held in a 'hybrid' format (online and offline) at 5 different locations including Oul Madang and CGV Picnic from July 8 to July 18.

As per quarantine guidelines of COVID-19, online screening of 154 films (61 feature films, 93 short films), which is about 60% of the entire film festival are open on Wavve. The opening ceremony was held at the Bucheon City Hall. Red carpet event to meet citizens was withdrawn this year.

This festival is a non-competitive international film festival with a competitive section.

== Events ==
- Performances
  - Special Event
  - Concert
- Special Events
  - GoeGoe O-TALK
  - Talk with Female Directors of Genre Films
- Exhibit
  - Typography by Kim M Kijo
  - Works of BAE Yoon-hwan
- Experiences
  - One-day Class

=== Special screening ===
Ku Hye-sun's short film Dark Yellow had a special screening on July 11, 2021. She addressed a press conference and met with the audience.

== Jury ==
=== Bucheon Choice: Features ===
- Tony Kaye (English film director)
- Meenakshi Shedde (South Asia Delegate Berlin Film Festival, pre-selecting films since 1998, and independent film curator from India)
- Jarod Neece (former Partner, Film Programmer, and Event Producer for the SXSW)
- Moon Jeong-hee (Actress South Korea, alumni of Korea National University of Arts, School of Drama)
- Jo Sung-hee (Film director South Korea, alumni of the Korean Academy of Film Arts (KAFA))

=== Korean Fantastic: Feature ===
- Kim Yun-mi (Film producer, South Korea)
- Cho Young-jik (Cinematographer, South Korea)
- Baek Seung-kee (Film producer, South Korea)

=== Bucheon Choice: Short and Korean Fantastic: Short ===
- Ji Se-yeon (Film festival programmer, South Korea)
- Jeong Ga-young (Film director and actor, South Korea)
- Kim Ki-jo (Visual designer, South Korea)

=== Méliès International Film Festival Federation (MIFF) Asian Film Award ===
- Pedro Soto (Secretary general of the Mellies International Film Festival Federation, Portugal)
- Florian Shoreer (Owner and operator of a local art house, Germany)

=== NETPAC award ===
- Sidharth Srinivasan (Genre film director, India)
- Kirsie Sena Boodee (Film director, Sri Lanka)
- Jung Min-ah (Film critic, Professor Department of Theater and Film, Sungkyul University)

== Program ==
All award winning films are in bold

=== Opening film ===
- Till We Meet Again (Giddens Ko, Taiwan)

=== Bucheon Choice ===
==== Bucheon Choice Features ====
- The Beta Test (Jim Cummings / P J McCabe USA 2021)
- Caveat (Damian McCarthy UK 2021)
- **The Feast (Lee Haven Jones UK 2021)**
- King Car (Renata Pinheiro, Brazil 2021)
- **The Medium (Banjong Pisanthanakun, Korea, Thailand 2021)**
- **NIMBY - Not In My Backyard (Teemu Nikki, Finland 2020)**
- Pistol (LV Huizhou China 2020)
- Tenement 66 (Rae Red, Philippines 2021)
- **Treat or Trick (HSU Fuhsiang, Taiwan 2021)**
- Vicious Fun (Cody Calahan, Canada 2020)

==== Bucheon Choice: Shorts 1 ====
- The Archivists (Igor Drljaca, Canada 2020)
- In One's Shadow (Mor Lankri, Israel 2020)
- **Night Bus (Joe HSIEH, Taiwan 2020)**
- Night of the Living Dicks (Ilja RAUTSI, Finland, Denmark 2021)
- Sins of a Werewolf (David PRENDEVILLE, Ireland 2020)
- Who Goes There? (Astrid THORVALDSEN, UK 2020)

==== Bucheon Choice: Shorts 2 ====
- The Criminals (Serhat KARAASLAN, France, Romania, Turkey 2021)
- Hospital Dumpster Divers (Anders ELSRUD HULTGREEN, Norway 2020)
- Namoo (Erick OH, USA 2021)
- The Shepherd (Ilya PLYUSNIN, Russia 2021)
- Solution for Sadness (Marc Martínez JORDÁN / Tuixén Benet COSCULLUELA, Spain 2020)
- **Stuffed (Theo RHYS, UK 2021)**

=== Korean Fantastic ===
==== Korean Fantastic: Competition ====
- **Action Hero (Lee Jin-ho, Korea 2021)**
- Dieter Fighter (Jeong Jee-yeong, Korea 2021)
- Ghost Image (Lee Sang-jun, Korea 2020)
- **Good Deal (Cho Kyoungho, Korea 2021)**
- **Show Me the Ghost (Kim Eunk-young, Korea 2021)**
- Trans (Do Naeri, Korea 2020)
- A Trap (Lee Moon-young, Korea 2021)
- Unboxing Girl (Kim Soo-jung, Korea 2021)

==== Korean Fantastic: Features ====
- AI Her (Lee Jung-sub, Korea 2021)
- Chill-Inn's Bum (Hahn Vad, Korea 2021)
- The Day I Died: Unclosed Case (Park Ji-wan, Korea 2020)
- Diva (Cho Seul-yeah, Korea 2020)
- Fumble Studio (Bae Yoon-hwan, Korea 2020)
- I Leave Home (Kim Sung-hwan, Korea 2021)

==== Korean Fantastic: Shorts 1 ====
- 316 Gongwon Street (Jung Min-soo, Korea 2021)
- Light in Empty (Kim Seo-jin, Korea 2021)
- **Pitch Black (LEE Junsup, Korea 2021)**
- Yellow Tomato (PAK Hyungnam, Korea 2020)

==== Korean Fantastic: Shorts 3 ====
- The Daughter (NAM Soona, Korea 2021)
- Forest of Purity: Attack of the Adultism (KANG Dongwon, Korea 2021)
- **The Noses on the Run (KIM Boram, Korea 2021)**
- Nowhere Else (LEE Kyeongwon, Korea 2021)

=== World Fantastic Red ===
- The Advent Calendar (Patrick Ridremont, France 2021)
- Anything for Jackson (Justin G. DYCK, Canada 2020)
- Apps (Lucio A. ROJAS / José Miguel ZÚÑIGA / Sandra ARRIAGADA / Camilo LEÓN / Samot MARQUEZ, Chile, Argentina 2021)
- **At the End of Evin (Mohammad TORABBEIGI / Mehdi TORABBEIGI, Iran 2021)**
- Baby (Juanma BAJO ULLOA, Spain 2020)
- The Barcelona Vampiress (Lluis DANES, Spain 2020)
- Benny Loves You (Karl HOLT, UK 2020)
- Bloodthirsty (Amelia MOSES, Canada 2020)
- Bloody Hell (Alister Grierson, Australia, USA 2020)
- Coming Home in the Dark (James ASHCROFT, New Zealand 2021)
- Dark World (Jittsint PONGINTARAKUL, Thailand 2021)
- Death Knot (Cornelio SUNNY, Indonesia 2021)
- The Forever Purge (Everardo Valerio Gout, USA 2020)
- The Fourth Face (Ranjeet Kamala Sankar and Salil V, India 2021)

=== World Fantastic Blue ===
- A-Ha : Take On Me (Thomas Robsahm / Aslaug Holm, Norway 2021)
- As We Like It (Chen Hung-i / Muni WEI, Taiwan 2021)
- **Beyond the Infinite Two Minutes (YAMAGUCHI Junta, Japan 2020)**
- The Con-Heartist (Mez THARATORN, Thailand 2020)
- Cross the Line (David VICTORI, Spain 2020)
- The Dawn (Dalibor MATANIĆ, Croatia 2020)
- Paranoia (Riri Riza, Indonesia 2021)

=== Family Zone ===
- Nussa (Bony Wirasmono, Indonesia 2021)
- Secret x Heroine Phantomirage!: Eiga ni Natte Chodaishimasu (MIIKE Takashi, Japan 2020)
- Super Hero (Kim Min-ha Korea 2021)

=== Forbidden Zone ===
- For the Sake of Vicious (Reese Eveneshen / Gabriel Carrer, Canada 2020)
- Mother Schmuckers (Lenny GUIT, Harpo GUIT, Belgium 2021)
- The Spine of Night (Philip GELATT / Morgan Galen KING, USA 2021)
- Violation (Madeleine Sims-Fewer, Dusty Mancinelli, Canada 2020)

=== Strange Homage ===
- The Amusement Park (George A. Romero, USA 1974, 2020)
- Blood Feast (Herschell Gordon Lewis, USA 1963)
- A Bucket of Blood (Roger Corman, USA 1959)
- Gooseflesh (YOON Jongchan, Korea 2001)
- Grudge of the Sleepwalking Woman (Gang Beomgu, Korea 1983)

=== Fantastic Short Films ===
==== Fantastic Short Films 1 ====
- The Beehive (Clovis TANGUY-TESTUD, France 2020)
- Catch You Catch Me (BAEK Jae-ho, Korea 2020)
- Fear Eats the Soul (KIM Dongsik, Korea 2021)

==== Fantastic Short Films 2 ====
- The Adventure of a Hard Drive (BAEK Seunghwa, Korea 2020)

==== Fantastic Short Films 3 ====
- Hug Me, Hug Me Right! (LEE Jian, Korea2021)
- **Voice (KIM Youngjae, Korea 2020)**

==== Fantastic Short Films 4 ====
- Breathtaking Cliff (BAK Sunyong, Korea 2021)

==== Fantastic Short Films 5 ====
- Chi Chi (JEON Chanwoo, Korea 2021)

==== Fantastic Short Films 6 ====
- Cashy (GIL Iji, Korea 2020)
- Chewing Gum (Mihir FADNAVIS, India 2021)
- Sipjangsaeng (JUNG Jaeyeon, Korea 2021)
- **Voice Over (LEE Minseob, Korea 2021)**

=== Vertical Short Film Special Screening : 25 ===
- 25 Years Old : the Age All the Young are Deprived of Their Dream (Park Churwoong, Korea 2021)
- 25 Years Old Couple (Jeong Ga-young, Korea 2021)

== Awards and winners ==
=== Bucheon Choice ===
==== Bucheon Choice Features ====
- Best of Bucheon (₩20000000): The Medium director Banjong Pisanthanakun, Korea, Thailand
- Best Director Choice (₩5,000,000): Lee Haven-Jones for The Feast UK
- Jury's Choice (₩5,000,000): Treat or Trick by HSU Fuhsiang (許富翔) Taiwan
- Audience Award: NIMBY - Not In My Backyard by Teemu Nikki, Finland

==== Bucheon Choice Shorts ====
- Best Short Film (₩5,000,000): Stuffed by Theo RHYS
- Jury's Choice for short Film (₩3,000,000): Night Bus by Joe HSIEH, Taiwan
- Audience Award for Short Film: Stuffed by Theo RHYS
- Jury’s Special Mention: Sins of a Werewolf by David PRENDEVILLE

=== Korean Fantastic ===
==== Korean Fantastic: Features ====
- Korean Fantastic Film (KRW 20,000,000): Action Hero director Lee Jin-ho, Korea
- Korean Fantastic Best Director (KRW 10,000,000): Cho Kyung-ho for Good Deal, Korea
- Fantastic Actor: (2 winners)
  - Lee Suk-hyung in Action Hero by Lee Jin-ho, Korea
  - Kim Hyun-mok in Show Me the Ghost (Kim Eunk-young, Korea 2021)
- Korean Fantastic Audience Award: Good Deal director Cho Kyung-ho, Korea
- Nonghyup Award (distribution award, KRW 10,000,000): Show Me the Ghost by Kim Eunk-young, Korea
- CGV Award (distribution award, KRW 10,000,000): Action Hero by Lee Jin-ho, Korea
- Watcha New Talent Award KRW 5,000,000): Action Hero director Lee Jin-ho, Korea
- Fantastic Actor Jury’s Special Mention:
  - Han Seung-yeon in Show Me the Ghost (Kim Eunk-young, Korea 2021)
  - Park Xiyeon in Dieter Fighter (Jeong Jeeyeong, Korea 2021)

==== Korean Fantastic: Short ====
- Best Korean Short Film (KRW 5,000,000): Pitch Black by LEE Junsup
- Audience Award for Korean Short Film: The Noses on the Run by KIM Bo-ram
- Watcha New Talent Awards (KRW 5,000,000) (5 winners):
  - Pitch Black by LEE Junsup
  - Voice by KIM Youngjae
  - Nipple War 3 by PAEK Siwon
  - Voice Over by LEE Minseob
  - Why is It so Warm on Christmas? by CHOI Woogene

=== Méliès International Festivals Federation(MIFF) Award for Best Asian Film ===
This award is intended to discover and promote Asian genre films.

- Awardee: At the End of Evin by Mohammad TORABBEIGI, Mehdi TORABBEIGI, Iran

=== NETPAC Award ===
This award is given by the Network for the Promotion of Asian Cinema (NETPAC).

- Awardee: Beyond the Infinite Two Minutes by YAMAGUCHI Junta, Japan

== Beyond Reality ==
The Festival is screening extended reality (XR) content through its program “Beyond Reality” at Incheon International Airport. There will be altogether 80 pieces of XR content, including 39 films, that are going to be screened. Five films created by US-based animation studio Baobab Studios are included in the program.

They are:

- Bonfire
- Crow: The Legend
- Namoo
- Baba Yaga
- Paper Birds
