= Kelly Bell =

English former glamour model

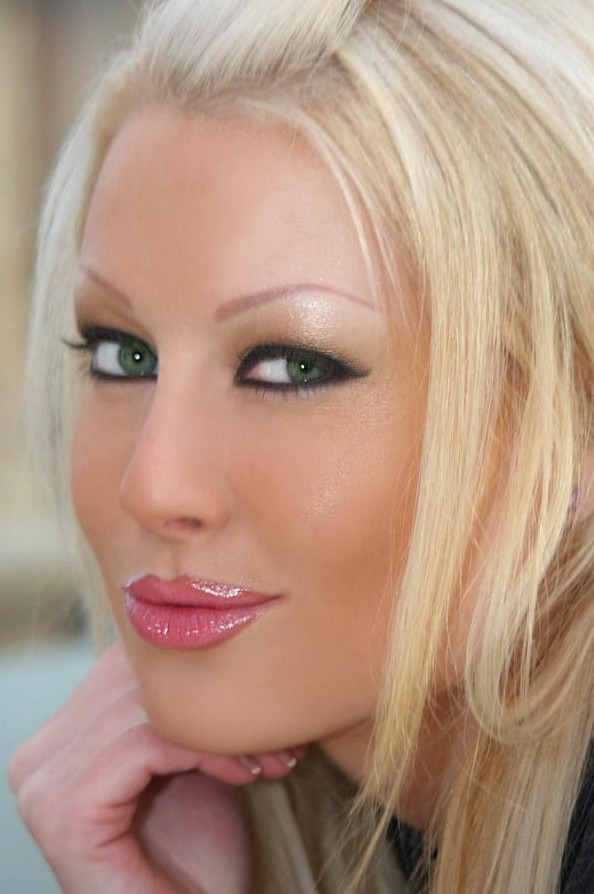
- Photo courtesy of Xintense.com
- Born: Kelly Bell; 21 February 1982 (age 44); Aldershot, England
- Occupation: Glamour model
- Height: 5 ft 3 in (1.60 m)

Kelly Bell (born 21 February 1982) is an English former glamour model.

== Career ==
As a child, Bell appeared as a model in many young teen girl magazines, as well as regular TV appearances. At the age of 16, she entered a modelling competition organised by the Daily Sport, winning out of several thousand entrants.

Bell was voted the UK's sexiest woman for 2007 by readers of the Daily & Sunday Sport.

Bell recorded a single titled Down 'n Dirty in 2003 and performed a concert in Colchester in aid of the Army Benevolent Fund.

Bell is a vegan, and supports the British animal rights group Viva!.
