= Seung-yeon =

- Hangul: 승연
- RR: Seungyeon
- MR: Sŭngyŏn
- IPA: [sɯŋjʌn]

Seung-yeon, also spelled Seung-yun, or Seung-yon, Sung-yeon, Sung-yon, is a Korean given name.

== People ==
People with this name include:

- Kim Seung-yeon (born 1952), South Korean businessman
- Choi Seung-youn (born 1964), South Korean female speed skater
- Lee Seung-yeon (born 1968), South Korean actress
- Lee Seung-yeon (born 1977), South Korean actress
- Woo Seung-yeon (1983–2009), South Korean model and actress
- Han Seung-yeon (born 1988), South Korean singer and actress, member of girl group Kara
- Hong Seung-yeon (born 1992), South Korean female tennis player
- Gong Seung-yeon (born Yoo Seung-yeon, 1993), South Korean actress
- Son Seung-yeon (born 1993), South Korean female singer
- Cho Seung-youn (born 1996), South Korean singer, member of boy groups Uniq and X1

== See also ==
- List of Korean given names
