= Apps (film) =

2021 anthology horror fantasy film

- Directed by: Lucio A. Rojas ("Edén"); Sandra Arriagada ("OnFire"); José Miguel Zúñiga ("Manada"); Camilo León ("Frequency"); Samot Márquez
- Written by: Sandra Arriagada; Diego Ayala; Camilo León; Lucio A. Rojas; José Miguel Zúñiga
- Starring: Tutú Vidaurre; Clara Kovacic; Fernanda Finterbusch; León Arriagada; Néstor Cantillana; Nicolás Durán; Ignacia Uribe
- Production companies: Fascinante Films; Mastodonte; Femtastica Films; Pragma Films
- Release date: 10 July 2021 (BIFAN)
- Countries: Chile; Argentina
- Language: Spanish

Apps (stylized APPS) is a 2021 anthology horror fantasy film directed by Lucio A. Rojas, Sandra Arriagada, José Miguel Zúñiga, Camilo León and Samot Márquez. An international co-production of Chile and Argentina, the film consists of five short stories, each of which involves a mobile app.

Apps was selected in the "Coming Soon" section of the Sitges Film Festival in 2020. The film premiered at the 25th Bucheon International Fantastic Film Festival in South Korea in July 2021.

== Synopsis ==
The film comprises five stories where a mobile application leads to mystery and horror. In one story, a young woman falls prey to a group of perverts who belong to a sinister network that streams live content online. In another, a voyeur uncovers dark secrets about her neighbors that she wishes she had never known. The third story follows a young woman who uses a mysterious dating app. In the fourth, a group of friends on their way to a cabin stumble upon a sinister occult sect operating behind a seemingly legitimate business. Finally, a boy, manipulated by his father into online dating, discovers an immense power to defend himself.

== Cast ==
- Ximena Del Solar as Bruja (Segment Eden)
- Daniel Antivilo as Brujo ( Segment Eden)
- Nicolas Duran as Matias ( Segment Eden)
- Tutu Vidarre as Andrea ( Segment Eden)
- Felipe Rios as Policia ( Segment Eden)
