= Hannah Claydon =

English glamour model

- Born: Hannah Rachel Claydon; 13 March 1986 (age 40); Wakefield, West Yorkshire, England
- Occupation: Glamour model
- Modelling information
- Height: 5 ft 0 in (1.52 m)
- Hair colour: Blonde
- Eye colour: Blue

Hannah Rachel Claydon (born 13 March 1986) is an English glamour model from Wakefield, West Yorkshire.

Claydon has been modelling since she was 15 years old, and in 2004 she made the Top 100 girls in FHM's High Street Honeys competition to find the nation's top amateur models. This was happening as she was revising and taking her A-level exams at Sixth Form College. She went on to achieve 4 "A" grades in her exams and was set to study Law at Oxford University but took a year out "to give modelling a go".

Her modelling took off and she had a successful career, appearing in many publications including Page 3 of the Daily Star and The Sun newspapers. As well as The Sun's "Dear Deidre" and Sunday People's "Dear Jane" agony-aunt pages. Claydon has also appeared in British men's magazines Loaded, FHM, Maxim, Nuts and Zoo. She appeared for the American Score website, which specialises in large busted models, and Playboy Special Editions magazines. She regularly appears on Babestation and OnlyTease websites.

She has been a popular model with the Daily and Sunday Sport newspapers. In the spirit of the newspaper's sensationalism, Claydon's image appeared on the shirts of Creighton Rugby Union Club, Cumbria, England.

Claydon told the Daily Sport that she had her breasts augmented to their current size in 2004. She is also a supporter of Leeds United Football Club.
