= Benny Loves You =

Film by Karl Holt

- Official release poster
- Directed by: Karl Holt
- Written by: Karl Holt
- Produced by: Karl Holt
- Starring: Claire Cartwright; Karl Holt; George Collie; James Parsons; David Wayman; Lydia Hourihan
- Cinematography: John Bowe; Karl Holt
- Edited by: Karl Holt
- Music by: Karl Holt
- Production company: Darkline Entertainment
- Distributed by: Alarm Pictures
- Release dates: November 21, 2019 (Bars); February 19, 2021 (United Kingdom)
- Running time: 94 minutes
- Country: United Kingdom
- Language: English

Benny Loves You is a 2019 British horror comedy film directed, written, edited, and produced by Karl Holt. It stars Claire Cartwright, George Collie, James Parsons, David Wayman, Lydia Hourihan and Holt himself. The film premiered at the Buenos Aires Rojo Sangre on November 21, 2019.

== Plot ==
Ashley, a spoiled brat, gets a new present and discards her old teddy bear. That night, the teddy bear pulls her into a closet and rips her eyes out, Ashley's mother discovers her corpse and screams in horror at the sight.

Jack, a failed toy designer, constantly depends on his parents, until they are killed in a freak accident on his 35th birthday. Ten months later, Jack is struggling financially from living on his own without support and dealing with maintenance and mortgage, while getting convinced by an estate agent named David to sell his house. Jack also sees his colleague, Richard, as competition, as he won the Designer of the Year award. Due to the failures of his toy designs, Jack is subsequently fired by his boss, Ron, and rehired for a lower waged position, instead of being promoted.

Jack decides to become an adult and sell his house, packs his toys, and, to Jack's sadness, throws away a stuffed bear named Benny, his favorite childhood toy. However, Benny destroys all of Jack's plush toys, which prompts him to call two police officers over for an investigation. However, they insult Jack and eat his biscuits. At work, Jack meets Dawn, a tech consultant, and begins a relationship.

At home, Jack finds David's head on the bed beside him, and the next morning, his body slumped on a chair, with his blood all over the house. He immediately cleans up his house and narrowly avoids getting caught when the police officers come by to get something they left in his house the day before. After Benny shreds a cat with a lawnmower, Jack makes Benny promise that he will stay here as long as he does not murder anyone else.

Jack is inspired by Benny to create several toy designs, which impresses Ron and his relationship grows closer with Dawn. A realtor shows Jack's house, to a woman named Tara, but Benny impales the realtor with a wooden sign and forces Tara to hide for a long period of time in Jack's attic. Jack comes home and is shocked by Benny actions, so he keeps him in a box for his date night with Dawn.

Benny frees himself as Ron drops off Precious, his dog, which Benny kills by hacking it in the back with a hatchet. Dawn shares a tragic backstory of when her father tripped over her favorite doll, Amy, and broke his neck. Jack decides to fake Precious' death by stabbing him and throwing him out the window and onto Ron's car, to allegedly protect Dawn from him.

Ron fires Jack, but Benny does not realize that Jack is upset, and even tries to play with the very stressed-out Jack. Benny kidnaps Ron, and Jack sees this as an opportunity to get his job back, but Benny throws a garden tool into Ron's throat before he is rehired. Jack buries Benny in the woods and spends time with Dawn while they clean up Ron's murder. Benny hitches a ride on Dawn's car as she and Jack travel back to work, where Jack tries to claim that Benny is dangerous, just to be mocked and laughed at by his colleagues. Benny stabs Richard in the hand, and Jack, Dawn, and Richard escape the room, locking Benny inside, where he subsequently massacres the remaining workers.

Jack, Dawn, and Richard go back to Jack's house to formulate a plan against Benny, even though Richard is pessimistic. Benny gears up with weapons, while at the same time the trio booby traps the house. Benny makes his way into Jack's house through his toilet. Dawn is ambushed by Benny with her childhood doll, Amy. Richard gets stabbed and has his organs sucked out by his toy Rosco, which he earlier discarded. Jack and Dawn continue fighting Benny and Amy, respectively, which ends with Amy being stabbed and Benny leaping out of the window and being shot to death by the same police officers from earlier.

Two months later, Jack and Dawn are starting a new life, with the two police officers covering for them about Benny. Rosco and Ashley's teddy bear are seen hiding out in an alleyway as the bear exclaims "You're Special". In a post-credits scene, Tara is seen dead in the attic, having hidden there for a long time and succumbed to starvation/dehydration.

== Cast ==
- Karl Holt as Jack / Benny
- Claire Cartwright as Dawn
- George Collie as Richard
- James Parsons as Ron
- Anthony Styles as Bad Cop
- Darren Benedict as Good Cop
- Lydia Hourihan as Tara
- David Wayman as Phil
- Jennifer Healy as Ashley's Mother
- Bella Munday as Ashley
- Catriona McDonald as Jack's Mother
- Greg Barnett as David
- Logan Murray as Young Jack
- Greg Page as Jack's Dad

== Production ==
Filming began in 2014 and was completed in 2015. In addition to writing directing and acting, Holt edited, scored and did the visual effects for the film as well.

== Release ==
The film premiered at the Buenos Aires Rojo Sangre on November 21, 2019, New York City Horror Film Festival on December 8, 2019, Sitges Film Festival on October 8, 2020, Trieste Science+Fiction Festival on November 1, 2020 and Panic Film Fest in Kansas City on April 9 to April 15, 2021.

Benny Loves You was released in the UK on February 19, 2021, and was scheduled to premiere in the United States in selected theaters on May 7 before becoming available on demand on May 11, 2021. The film's Blu-ray release was on June 8, 2021.

Benny Loves You was selected at the 25th Bucheon International Fantastic Film Festival (BIFAN) in South Korea, held in July 2021. It was showcased in the World Fantastic Red section of the festival.

== Reception ==
On review aggregator website Rotten Tomatoes, the film holds an approval rating of 79% based on 29 reviews, with an average rating of 6.9/10. The site's consensus reads, "A zany entry into the sentient murder toy genre, Benny Loves You is an enjoyably macabre and clever horror comedy that will have audiences rooting for its loveable villain."

Anton Bitel of Sight and Sound wrote:

In this comic killer-doll film, our hero struggles to put away childish things, even as we are left wondering whether it might be Jack's own arrested psyche, rather than a stuffed animal, that is the real deadly danger.

== Accolades ==
Award ceremony	Category	Recipient	Result	Ref.
Sitges Film Festival	Best Film	Benny Loves You	Nominated	
FrightFest	Best Film	Benny Loves You - Karl Holt	Won	
