= Crumpet!: A Very British Sex Symbol =

2005 British TV documentary

Crumpet!: A Very British Sex Symbol is a one-hour BBC TV documentary written by Julie Burchill and Jane Garcia. Presented by Tony Livesey and directed by John Moulson, it was first shown on UK TV on 28 December 2005.

The programme charted the history of British female sex symbols (known as "crumpet", an English colloquialism), starting with Diana Dors and using archive footage up to the late 1980s, featuring some of James Bond's glamour girls, vampire victims in Hammer Horror films, the sexy girls of the Carry On films, vestal virgins in the TV comedy Up Pompeii, and characters in Man About the House. It also features interviews with members of Pan's People, the resident dancing troupe on Top of The Pops, and an interview with the singer-songwriter Lynsey de Paul. The documentary featured actors Honor Blackman, Ingrid Pitt, Barbara Windsor, Madeline Smith, Alexandra Bastedo, Caroline Munro, Julie Ege, Sue Upton, Sally Thomsett, Leslie Philips and Wendy Richard. As well as this, it included analyses by cultural commentators such as Dylan Jones, Germaine Greer, and Ned Sherrin.

The Guardian newspaper reviewed the programme and noted that, perhaps surprisingly, Greer was not angered by the material that was being considered. She observed in the programme that "There's not much nutritional value in crumpet, but it won't kill you". A year later, to redress the balance, the documentary Beefcake: A Very British Sex Symbol, also presented by Livesey, was broadcast by BBC2 on 27 December 2006.
