= Kim Hyun-mok =

South Korean actor

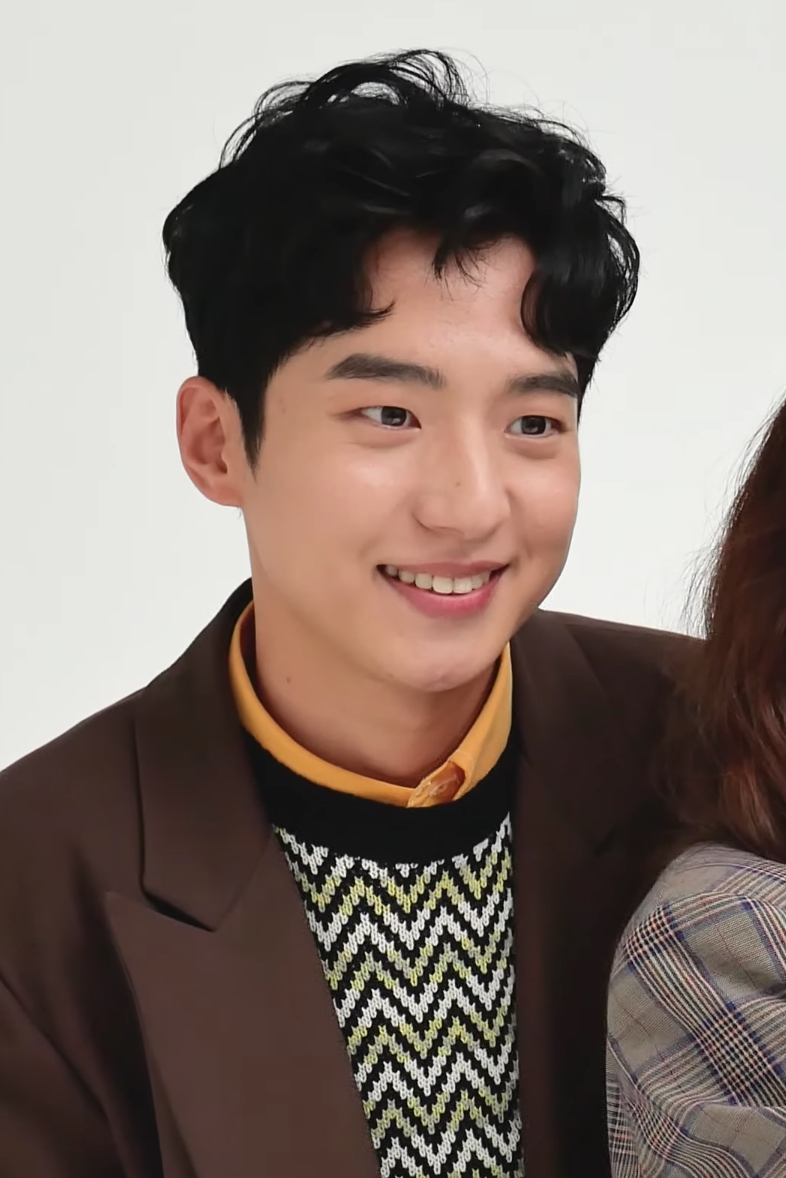
- Kim in 2021
- Born: Kim Hyun-mok; 18 September 1991 (age 35); South Korea
- Other name: Kim Hyeon-mok
- Education: Korea University (BA in Environmental Ecology Engineering and Sociology)
- Occupations: Actor; model
- Years active: 2016–present
- Agent: ASP Company
- Known for: Extraordinary You; Once Again; Memorials

Kim Hyun-mok is a South Korean actor and model. He is known for his roles in dramas such as Extraordinary You, Once Again, and Memorials.

== Filmography ==
=== Television series ===
Year	Title	Role	Ref.
2016	Drinking Solo	College student	
2016	Guardian: The Lonely and Great God	Bus Passenger	
2016	My Old Friend	Jung-woo	
2017	Strong Girl Bong-soon	Bullied student	
2017	Go Back	Broadcasting student	
2018	Real Life Love Story 3	Co-worker	
2018	Broject	Go Young-jae	
2018	Just Too Bored	Kim Chul-soo	
2018	SURF 101: Intro to Romance	Lee Byung-jin	
2018	Memories of the Alhambra	J One Employee	
2019	Kill It	Lee Yoon-seung	
2019	Justice	Lee Tae-joo	
2019	Extraordinary You	Ahn Soo-chul	
2020	Fight Hard, Love Harder 2	Taek	
2020	Once Again	Hong Sung-woo	
2020	Kkondae Intern	Park Cheol-min	
2020	Memorials	Jung Yong-gyu	
2020	Stranger 2	Dongducheon police officer	
2021	Navillera	Kim Se-jong	
2021	Lovers of the Red Sky	Mansoo	
2021	Kingdom: Ashin of the North	Joseon soldier	
2021	Now, We Are Breaking Up	Fraudster	
2021	Bad and Crazy	Witness	
2022	Alice, the Final Weapon	Myeong-tae	
2022	Love in Contract	Yoo Jung-han	
2022	Love on Green	Yoon Joo-im	
2023	Doctor Cha	Hwang Seong-gyu	
2023	My Perfect Stranger	Jeon Young-nok	
2023	Doona!	Stalker	
2023	The Matchmakers	Kim Oh-bong	
2023	Between Him and Her	Kim Hyung-seop	
2024	The Judge from Hell	Angel Gabriel	
2024	Love Next Door	Vlogger	
2024	Love Your Enemy	Lee Ki-ha	
2025	Crushology 101	Ko Bong-su	

=== Film ===
Year	Title	Role	Ref.
2016	Ugly People	Yong-hyun	
2016	Boundary	Baek-ma	
2016	Good day for watching porn	Oh Dong-seok	
2017	Monologue	Jung	
2017	Forgotten	Student at police station	
2018	Dong-Ah	Dong-a's boyfriend	
2018	Heung-boo: The Revolutionist	Audience on street	
2018	The Three-Legged Race	Sung-jin	
2018	Queer Movie Beautiful	Pyung Beom-hae	
2019	The Dude in Me	Kim Jae-ik	
2020	The Boy From Nowhere	Pil-seong	
2021	Show Me the Ghost	Ho-du	
2021	Short Bus: Bad Dream	Hammer	
2025	3670	Yeong-jun	

== Awards and nominations ==
Year	Award	Category	Nominated work	Result	Ref.
2016	10th Great Short Film Festival	Jury Special Mention		Won	
2017	JoongAng Film Festival	Acting Awards		Won	
2020	Ulsan International Film Festival	Best Actor Award		Won	
2020	6th Korea-China International Short Film Festival	Best Actor Award		Won	
2021	25th Bucheon International Fantastic Film Festival	Korean Fantastic: Fantastic Actor	Show Me the Ghost	Won	
2025	Jeonju International Film Festival	Best Actor	3670	Won	
