= Linsey Dawn McKenzie =

British retired pornographic film actress (born 1978)

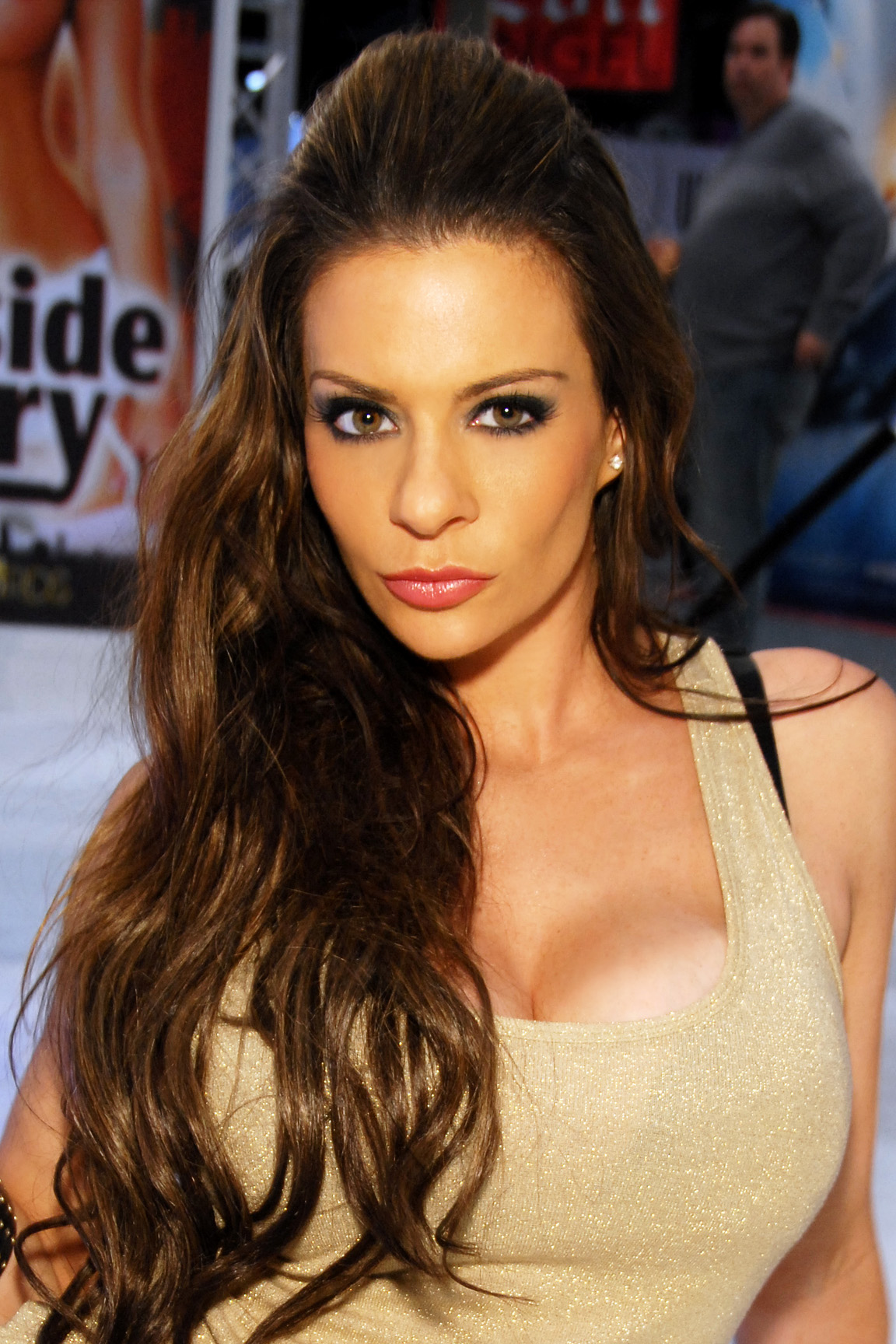
- McKenzie at the AVN Adult Entertainment Expo in 2011
- Born: Linsey Dawn McKenzie; 7 August 1978 (age 48); Brent, London, England
- Occupations: Glamour model; pornographic performer; television personality
- Height: 5 ft 3 in (1.60 m)
- Spouse(s): Terry Canty (m. 2001; div. 2001) Mark Williams (m. 2006)
- Children: 1

Linsey Dawn McKenzie (born 7 August 1978) is an English retired glamour model, retired pornographic performer, and former television personality who made her topless modeling debut in the Sunday Sport tabloid newspaper on her 16th birthday in 1994. Known for her naturally large breasts, she went on to feature in a wide range of adult magazines, websites, broadcast media, and videos, including pornography productions until her retirement in 2026.

She has attained minor celebrity status in the United Kingdom, where she has appeared on a number of mainstream television programmes, such as They Think It's All Over, I'm Famous and Frightened!, The Weakest Link, and Celebrity Four Weddings. She has also appeared in documentaries about the lives of glamour models and was featured in Martin Gooch's 2002 film Arthur's Amazing Things.

== Early life ==
Linsey Dawn McKenzie was born on 7 August 1978 in the London Borough of Brent and grew up in Wallington in the London Borough of Sutton. She is the youngest of three children. Her parents, Tony and Lesley McKenzie, divorced in 1987.

== Career ==
In early 1994, when McKenzie was 15, she sent sample glamour photographs to local modelling agencies. She began her modelling career by glamour modelling and swimsuit work, intending to progress to topless modelling when she turned 16 later that year. (Note: At that time the minimum age at which a person could legally appear in pornographic material in England and Wales was 16, as set by the Protection of Children Act 1978. This minimum age was later raised to 18 by the Sexual Offences Act 2003, which went into effect from May 2004.)

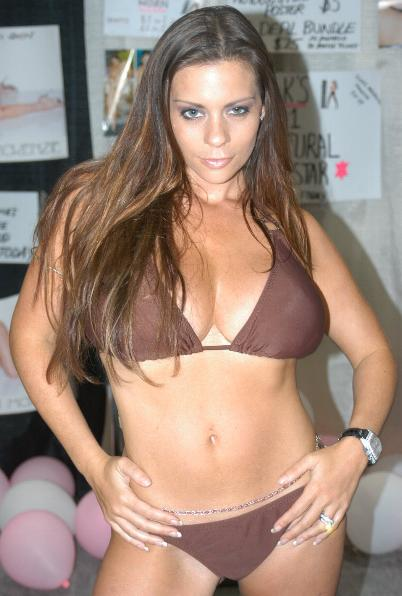
McKenzie at Erotica LA in 2006

As McKenzie approached her 16th birthday, the Sunday Sport tabloid newspaper expressed an interest in turning her topless debut into a media event. Throughout June and July 1994, it published pictures of McKenzie, counting down the days until it could legally show her topless.

After she turned 16, McKenzie continued to model topless for the Daily Sport and the Sunday Sport. She also made Page 3 appearances in tabloid newspapers The Sun and The Daily Star; posed topless in lads' mags such as Loaded; appeared fully nude in British magazines such as Mayfair and Men Only; and performed in a variety of softcore videos.

On 29 July 1995, shortly before her 17th birthday, McKenzie did a topless streak at a televised cricket match between England and the West Indies at Old Trafford. Wearing only a thong and a pair of trainers, she ran onto the field with the words "Only Teasing" written across her breasts.

After McKenzie turned 18 in 1996, she made her North American modelling debut in the breast fetishism magazine Score, which marked the occasion by making McKenzie the cover girl of its December 1996 "5th Anniversary" issue.

In the late 1990s, McKenzie was frequently featured on the adult-oriented channels L!VE TV and Television X. She continued to appear regularly in magazines, DVDs, Internet sites, and broadcast media until late 2004, when she took a break from modelling to have a child and undergo a breast reduction operation.

A biography of McKenzie, Temptress: The Linsey Dawn McKenzie Story, was published in 2015.

On April 10, 2026, McKenzie released a statement on both X and Instagram announcing her retirement to care for her autistic son.

== Appearances ==
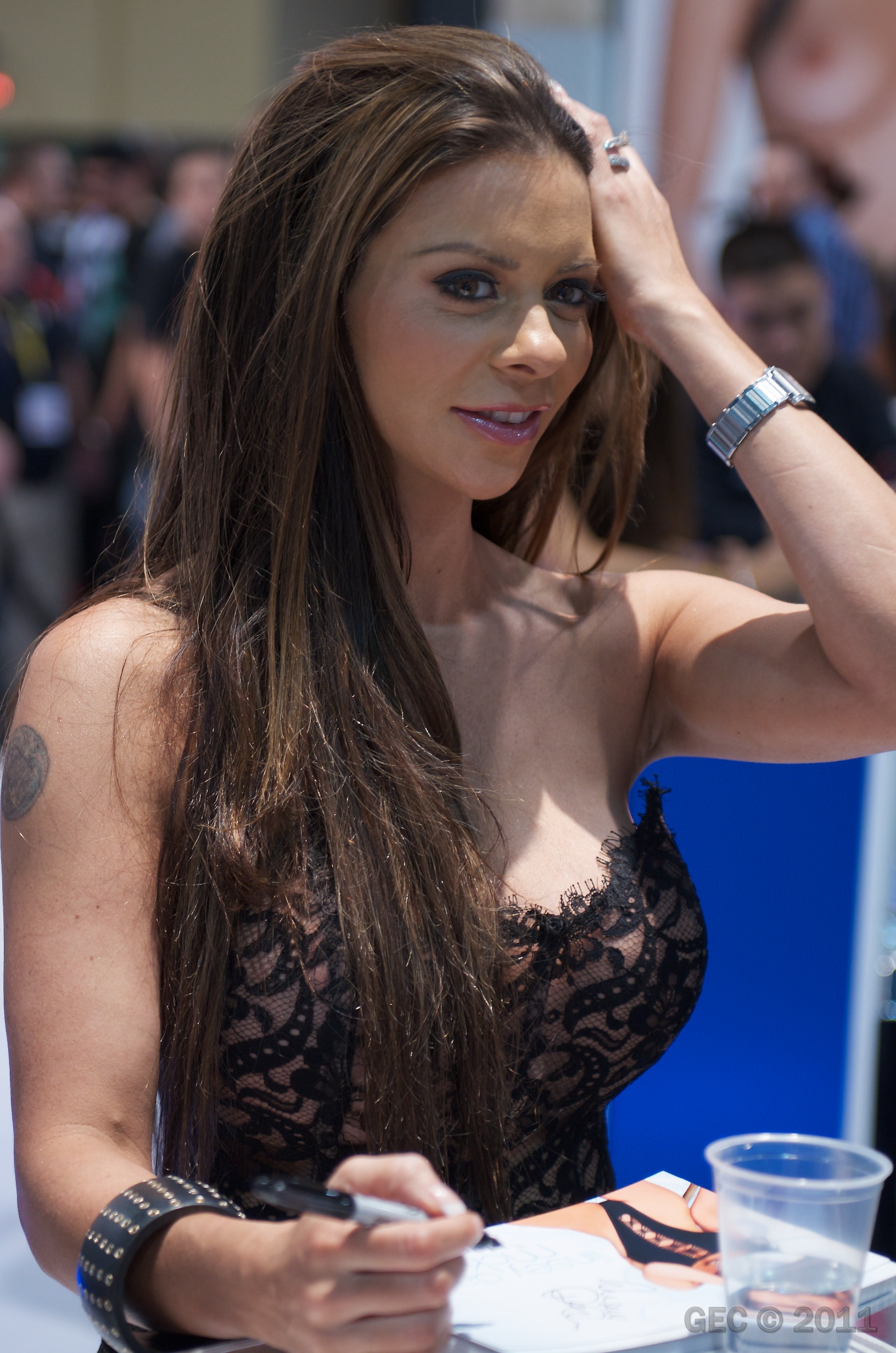
McKenzie at AVN Adult Entertainment Expo in 2011

McKenzie's mainstream television appearances include the BBC sporting quiz show They Think It's All Over, the reality television shows I'm Famous and Frightened! and The Salon, and the science programme Brainiac: Science Abuse. In the United States, she appeared on The Howard Stern Show in January 2003. On 8 September 2007, she appeared on a special charity edition of the BBC quiz show The Weakest Link, on which all contestants were glamour models who were dating or married to footballers. In December 2010, she featured with her husband Mark Williams on an episode of Living TV's Celebrity Four Weddings. The episode also featured actress Tina Malone, Big Brother contestant Spencer Smith and magician Paul Daniels and his wife, Debbie McGee.

Additionally, McKenzie has appeared in two documentaries about the lives of glamour models, The Curse of Page 3; and Girls Behaving Badly. She also played the character Beryl fforbes-Juggs in Martin Gooch's 2002 film Arthur's Amazing Things.

== Personal life ==
In 1996, when she was 17, McKenzie became involved in an extramarital affair with 27-year-old Wimbledon footballer Dean Holdsworth. The relationship received widespread attention in the British media.

In 1998, she became engaged to actor Michael Greco, who at the time was playing the role of Beppe di Marco in the BBC soap opera EastEnders. She twice became pregnant over the course of her 15-month relationship with Greco, but miscarried both times.

McKenzie began dating 21-year-old Terry Canty in 2000. The couple married on 21 April 2001 and Canty performed with McKenzie in her first heterosexual hardcore photoshoots and video. Scenes featuring the couple were released on the 2001 DVD Ultimate Linsey. The couple separated six weeks after their wedding and divorced in 2001.

In 2004, McKenzie began a relationship with former Wimbledon and Northern Ireland footballer Mark Williams. On 16 May 2005, she gave birth to the couple's son, Luca Scott Mark Williams. McKenzie married Williams on 5 January 2006.

== See also ==
- List of British pornographic actors
- Pornography in the United Kingdom
