= Joachim de Posada =

Cuban-American motivational speaker and author

Joachim de Posada (August 23, 1947 – June 11, 2015) was a Cuban born motivational speaker, best known as co-author of the book Don’t Eat the Marshmallow...Yet. Joachim de Posada held a bachelor's degree in Business Administration from the University of Puerto Rico, a master's degree and became a consultant for Learning International and Achieve Global after the division was sold to Times Mirror Corporation. De Posada was named one of the top 10 Hispanic Professional Speakers in the United States by Hispanic Business magazine in 2002.

De Posada co-wrote Don't Eat the Marshmallow... Yet: The Secret to Sweet Success Life and Work, with Ellen Singer, published by Penguin. The main theme was based on an experiment in delayed gratification, showing self-discipline is better than a lack of discipline. It was named Best Book of the Month by The New York Times in 2005. He also co-wrote with Ellen Singer, Don't Gobble the Marshmallow...Ever: The Secret to Sweet Success in Times of Change, also published by Penguin. His latest book was : Keep Your Eye On the Marshmallow: The Fastest Way to Gain Focus and Resilience And Come Out Ahead co-written with Bob Andelman. Other notable works include How to Survive Among Piranhas: How to get what you want with what you have.
