= Daily Sport =

British tabloid newspaper

- Type: Daily newspaper
- Format: Tabloid
- Owner(s): David Sullivan (1991–2011); Grant Miller (2011–present)
- Founder: David Sullivan
- Publisher: Daily Sport Ltd. (previously by Sport Newspapers)
- Founded: 1991
- Ceased publication: 2011
- Political alignment: None (focuses on tabloid journalism)
- Circulation: online publication
- Website: dailysport.co.uk

The Daily Sport was a tabloid newspaper published in the United Kingdom by Daily Sport Ltd., which specialised in celebrity news and softcore pornographic stories and images. The daily paper was launched in 1991 by David Sullivan, following its former Sunday sister title, Sunday Sport (first published in 1986). It ceased publication and entered administration on 1 April 2011.

Following the purchase on 7 June by the telecom, travel and internet entrepreneur Grant Miller, the new online Daily Sport was relaunched on 17 August 2011 with sports coverage plus classified advertising for the first time in its twenty-year history. There are not thought to be any plans for a print relaunch; however, Midweek Sport, Weekend Sport and Sunday Sport are still published by Sunday Sport (2011) Ltd.

== Focus and content ==
The Daily Sport did not normally include news, although in 2008 Lembit Öpik (then a Liberal Democrat MP) began a regular weekly political column. Instead, its coverage indulged more in tabloid journalism, with an emphasis on celebrities, bad behaviour and toilet humour.

The Daily Sport, like the Sunday Sport, was known for ridiculous headlines to entirely fabricated stories. Later editorial practice meant an end to such stories and an increased focus on celebrity news and sexual revelations.

Daily Sport often published fake nude pictures of celebrities and also paparazzi 'upskirt' and 'downblouse' or nipple slip pictures. The fake nude pictures were published with the appropriate disclaimers and captions, although the front cover image was often accompanied by a titillating caption, like "Tender tips make tastier tea". In September 2008, The Sport was criticised by the Press Complaints Commission for glamourising suicide by publishing a "Top yourself tourism list".

A large portion of advertising was for adult goods and services, such as phone-sex chat lines and Internet chat and sexually intimate sites. A feature of the paper was the classified advertisements, which in reality were a series of short advertisements for massage parlours and escort services across the country. In later years, the classified adverts had also become a place for swingers to advertise.

The Daily Sport pioneered the football crossword in the United Kingdom. The crossword positioned in the back pages alongside the football journalists reports was unique in the fact that the clues were solely devoted to questions which related to the sport. After two years of his work appearing in the Daily Sport the grid also became a regular feature in the Sunday Sport editions.

The Sport claimed to have launched the careers of numerous models, among them Louise Hodges who modeled throughout the 1990s Linsey Dawn McKenzie, who began posing topless for the newspaper in 1994, and Cherry Dee who began posing topless for them in 2003 when they were both 16 (the legal age for such activity in the United Kingdom at the time). Among recent popular Sport models were Kelly Bell, Hannah Claydon and Lauren Pope; however, very few Sport models also appeared in the other tabloids which the paper regarded as its rivals.

The Daily Sport and Sunday Sport were sold by David Sullivan to Sport Media Group in 2007. The papers were relaunched in April 2008 under the editorial leadership of Barry McIlheney and James Brown, the founder of Loaded. In October 2008, Pam McVitie was appointed the first female editor of the Daily Sport. In 2009, SMG had to be bailed out by David Sullivan and Gold Group International, after having been put up for sale by its owners.

Publication was suspended from 1 April 2011 after Sport Media Group ceased trading and was broken up by administrators. Entrepreneur Grant Miller acquired the rights to the Daily Sport and relaunched it online through a new company Daily Sport Limited. Sullivan now publishes the Midweek Sport (Wednesdays), Weekend Sport (Fridays) and Sunday Sport, through his company Sunday Sport (2011) Limited.

== Circulation ==
Circulation levels in 2009 were 84,000 and rising, but they then fell sharply with the company's financial difficulties. The publication now only exists online.

== See also ==
- Sport Newspapers
