= Sport Newspapers =

British publishing firm

Sport Newspapers was the British publishing firm responsible for the Daily Sport, Sunday Sport newspapers and a number of mid shelf and top shelf magazine titles, such as Adult Sport, Sport Babes, Sport Reader's Wives and Ladsmag. It was founded in 1986 by David Sullivan, to launch the newspaper Sunday Sport. The company offices were in Manchester.

An attempt was made to publish a weekly version in Ireland, called the Irish Weekly Sport, but its softcore pornography and trivial content proved unpopular within the Republic.

== Subsidiaries ==
Subsidiaries to Sport Newspapers include Flip Media which was set up by Michael Bancroft, a former director of SMD Publishing to publish Front magazine and DVD World.

== Administration ==
On 1 April 2011, the holding company for the firm, Sport Media Group Plc, announced that it had ceased trading, and the company was broken up by administrators.

== Successors ==
Sullivan acquired the rights to some of Sport newspapers and now publishes the Midweek Sport (Wednesdays), Weekend Sport (Fridays) and Sunday Sport, through his new company (also based in Manchester) Sunday Sport (2011) Limited.

Grant Miller acquired the rights to the Daily Sport and relaunched it online through a new company, Daily Sport Limited.
