= The Dead Inside (2013 film) =

- Directed by: Andrew Gilbert
- Written by: Andrew Gilbert; Julian Hundy
- Produced by: Andrew Gilbert; Julian Hundy; Jamie Meekins
- Starring: David Wayman; Simon Nader; Luke Hobson; Andrew Lloyd
- Production company: Hundy Gilbert Media
- Distributed by: Media Sales UK
- Release date: 15 October 2013
- Running time: 115 minutes
- Country: United Kingdom
- Language: English
- Budget: £15,000

The Dead Inside (also known internationally as Infected) is a 2013 British independent horror film directed by Andrew Gilbert. It was written and produced by Gilbert in collaboration with Julian Hundy. It was Hundy Gilbert Media's first feature film. In the film, a phenomenon of unidentified origin has caused the reanimation of the dead, who prey on human flesh, which subsequently causes mass hysteria. The large ensemble cast features David Wayman, Simon Nader, and Luke Hobson as survivors of the outbreak who barricade themselves inside a village high school.

== Plot ==
After an unexplained virus causes the reanimation of the dead, a group of civilian and British Army survivors barricade themselves inside a village high school.

== Cast ==
- David Wayman as PTE Paul Bradburn
- Simon Nader as Wayne Andrews
- Luke Hobson as Adam

== Production ==
The Dead Inside was filmed over approximately four months, from late 2010 to early 2011, in the English counties of Bedfordshire and Buckinghamshire. Its primary filming location was Holywell Middle School, Cranfield. The film was made on a budget estimated at £15,000.

== Release ==
The film was released on 15 October 2013 in the UK, and RLJ Entertainment released it in the U.S. on 1 June 2015.

== Reception ==
Matt Boiselle of Dread Central rated it 2/5 stars and called it a "cookie-cutter retread" despite "glimpses of brilliance". Mark L. Miller of Ain't It Cool News described it as "an overlong and overwrought telling of your basic zombie outbreak scenario". Influx Magazine rated it C− and wrote that the film, while a labor of love, suffers from its low budget. Todd Martin of HorrorNews.Net called it "painfully unoriginal", though he complimented Nader's acting.
