= Pulvermacher =

Pulvermacher is a German-language surname. It is described as a German and Ashkenazi Jewish occupational surname, derived from Pulver and Macher, and has been interpreted as meaning "maker of powder" or "manufacturer of gunpowder". According to the ANU Museum of the Jewish People, the name may in some cases have referred to an apothecary who made and sold medicinal powders, and may also have been used as a German translation of the Polish surname Prochownik.

== People with the surname ==
- Anna Pulvermacher (c. 1856–1938), German-born painter and social reformer
- Emil Pulvermacher (1878–1958), German actor
- Isaac Lewis Pulvermacher (1815–1884), German inventor
- Lucian Pulvermacher (1918–2009), American Catholic priest
- Oscar Pulvermacher (1882–1958), British journalist
