= W. G. Fish =

English newspaper editor and garden owner 1874–1947

Walter George Fish CBE (3 June 1874 – 21 December 1947), known as W. G. Fish, edited a popular English daily newspaper. He and his second wife Margery Fish, who became a noted gardening author and plantswoman, established a cottage-style Somerset garden, East Lambrook Manor, which she further developed after his death. It remains much visited.

== Early life ==
Born in Accrington, Lancashire, Fish studied at Westminster City School before entering journalism.

== Journalism and wartime occupations ==
Fish joined the Daily Mail in 1904 and was promoted to news editor in 1906. There he quickly gained notice by providing the first reports of the murderer Dr Crippen's arrest in Canada.

During the First World War, he worked for the Board of Trade, organising publicity for coal mining. He was appointed a Commander of the Order of the British Empire in the 1919 New Year Honours.

Fish was promoted to the post of editor of the Mail in 1919. In 1922, he fell out with the newspaper's owner, Lord Northcliffe, threatening to sue him for libel, but he was dissuaded and ultimately continued as editor until 1930. He spent his retirement as a director of the Mail and during the Second World War advised the Ministry of Information and Press and Censorship Bureau.

== Gardening ==
In the late 1930s, Fish and his second wife Margery Fish bought East Lambrook Manor in Somerset, mainly in response to the dangers of the Second World War. There they established an innovative cottage garden that still attracts many visitors.

The couple famously had clashing styles, with Walter favouring bright summer flowers and Margery preferring an informal style with many shade-loving plants and early spring flowers. These included the snowdrop, of which she built up a collection of species and varieties, making her a prominent galanthophile. The development of the garden is detailed in Margery Fish's semi-autobiographical, semi-instructional gardening books, We Made a Garden (1956) and its successors.

Media offices
Preceded by Thomas Marlowe	Editor of the Daily Mail; 1922–1930	Succeeded by Oscar Pulvermacher
