= Guy Schofield =

British newspaper editor

Edward Guy Schofield (10 July 1902 – 14 February 1990) was a British newspaper editor.

Born in Leeds, Schofield attended Leeds Modern School, then began his career in 1918 on the Leeds Mercury, before moving to the Daily Dispatch and the Evening Chronicle. In 1931, he transferred to the Evening Standard as Chief Sub Editor, then in 1938 he began his editorial career, on the Yorkshire Evening News. He edited the Evening News from 1942 to 1950, and then the Daily Mail until 1955, serving on the Press Council for the last two years.

In 1955, Schofield left journalism to become Director of Publicity for the Conservative Party. He served on the boards of directors of various newspaper groups until 1982. His special interest was theology and the history of Christianity and he published several books on this subject and the newspaper industry.

Media offices
Preceded by Frank Fitzhugh	Editor of the Evening News; 1942–1950	Succeeded by John Marshall
Preceded by Frank Owen	Editor of the Daily Mail; 1950–1955	Succeeded by Arthur Wareham
