= Daily Mail =

British tabloid newspaper

- Seriously Popular

- Daily Mail front page on 11 July 2021
- Type: Daily newspaper
- Format: Tabloid
- Owner: Daily Mail and General Trust
- Founder(s): Alfred Harmsworth and Harold Harmsworth
- Publisher: DMG Media
- Editor: Ted Verity
- Founded: 4 May 1896; 130 years ago
- Political alignment: Right-wing
- Language: English
- Headquarters: Northcliffe House; 2 Derry Street; London W8 5TT
- Circulation: 617,447 (as of October 2025)
- ISSN: 0307-7578
- OCLC number: 16310567
- Website: dailymail.com

The Daily Mail, often known simply as the Mail, is a British daily middle-market tabloid-size conservative newspaper founded in 1896 and published in London. Its sister paper The Mail on Sunday was launched in 1982, a Scottish edition was launched in 1947, and an Irish edition in 2006. Content from the paper appears on the MailOnline news website, although the website is managed separately and has its own editor.

The paper is owned by the Daily Mail and General Trust. Jonathan Harmsworth, 4th Viscount Rothermere, a great-grandson of one of the original co-founders, is the chairman and controlling shareholder of the Daily Mail and General Trust, while day-to-day editorial decisions for the newspaper are usually made by a team led by the editor. Ted Verity succeeded Geordie Greig as editor in November 2021.

A survey in 2014 found the average age of its readers was 58, and it had the lowest demographic for 15- to 44-year-olds among the major British dailies. Uniquely for a British daily newspaper, women make up the majority (52–55%) of its readership. It had an average daily circulation of 1.13 million copies in February 2020. Between April 2019 and March 2020 it had an average daily readership of approximately 2.18 million, of whom approximately 1.41 million were in the ABC1 demographic and 0.77 million in the C2DE demographic. Its website had more than 218 million unique visitors per month in 2020.

The Daily Mail has won several awards, including receiving the National Newspaper of the Year award from The Press Awards nine times since 1994 (as of 2020). The Society of Editors selected it as the 'Daily Newspaper of the Year' for 2020. The Daily Mail has been criticised for its unreliability, its printing of sensationalist and inaccurate scare stories about science and medical research, and for instances of plagiarism and copyright infringement. In February 2017, the English Wikipedia banned the use of the Daily Mail as a reliable source.

== Overview ==
The Mail was originally a broadsheet but switched to a compact format on 3 May 1971, the 75th anniversary of its founding. On this date it also absorbed the Daily Sketch, which had been published as a tabloid by the same company.

The publisher of the Mail, the Daily Mail and General Trust (DMGT), is listed on the London Stock Exchange.

Circulation figures according to the Audit Bureau of Circulations in February 2020 show gross daily sales of 1,134,184 for the Daily Mail. According to a December 2004 survey, 53% of Daily Mail readers voted for the Conservative Party, compared to 21% for Labour and 17% for the Liberal Democrats. The main concern of Viscount Rothermere, the current chairman and main shareholder, is that the circulation be maintained. He testified before a House of Lords select committee that "we need to allow editors the freedom to edit", and therefore the newspaper's editor was free to decide editorial policy, including its political allegiance. In November 2021, Ted Verity began a new seven-day role as editor of Mail newspapers, with responsibility for the Daily Mail, The Mail on Sunday and You magazine.

== History ==
=== Early history ===
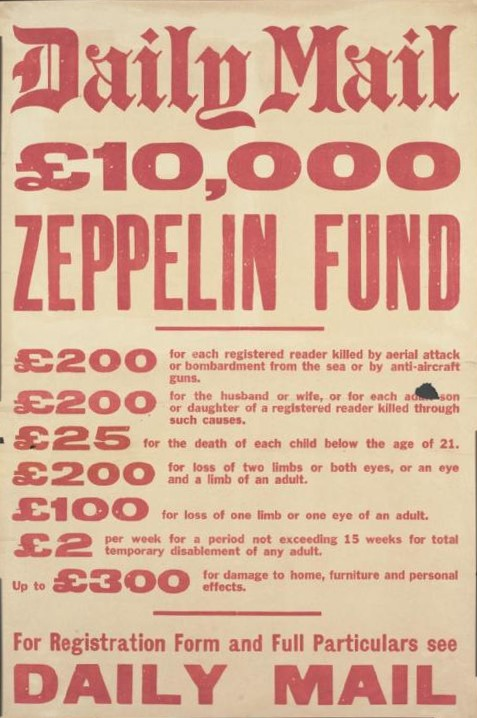
Advertisement by the Daily Mail for insurance against Zeppelin attacks during the First World War

The Daily Mail, devised by Alfred Harmsworth (later Viscount Northcliffe) and his brother Harold (later Viscount Rothermere), was first published on 4 May 1896. It was an immediate success. It cost a halfpenny at a time when other London dailies cost one penny, and was more populist in tone and more concise in its coverage than its rivals. The planned issue was 100,000 copies, but the print run on the first day was 397,215, and additional printing facilities had to be acquired to sustain a circulation that rose to 500,000 in 1899. Lord Salisbury, 19th-century Prime Minister of the United Kingdom, dismissed the Daily Mail as "a newspaper produced by office boys for office boys." By 1902, at the end of the Boer Wars, the circulation was over a million, making it the largest in the world.

With Harold running the business side of the operation and Alfred as editor, the Mail from the start adopted an imperialist political stance, taking a patriotic line in the Second Boer War, leading to claims that it was not reporting the issues of the day objectively. The Mail also set out to entertain its readers with human interest stories, serials, features and competitions. It was the first newspaper to recognise the potential market of the female reader with a women's interest section and hired one of the first female war correspondents Sarah Wilson who reported during the Second Boer War.

In 1900, the Daily Mail began printing simultaneously in both Manchester and London, the first national newspaper to do so (in 1899, the Daily Mail had organised special trains to bring the London-printed papers north). The same production method was adopted in 1909 by the Daily Sketch, in 1927 by the Daily Express and eventually by virtually all the other national newspapers. Printing of the Scottish Daily Mail was switched from Edinburgh to the Deansgate plant in Manchester in 1968 and, for a while, The People was also printed on the Mail presses in Deansgate. In 1987, printing at Deansgate ended, and the northern editions were thereafter printed at other Associated Newspapers plants.

For a time in the early 20th century, the paper championed vigorously against the "Yellow Peril", warning of the alleged dangers said to be posted by Chinese immigration to the United Kingdom. The "Yellow Peril" theme came to be abandoned because the Anglo-German naval race led to a more plausible threat to the British empire to be presented. In common with other Conservative papers, the Daily Mail used the Anglo-German naval race as a way of criticising the Liberal governments that were in power from 1906 onward, claiming that the Liberals were too pusillanimous in their response to the Tirpitz plan.

In 1906, the paper offered £10,000 for the first flight from London to Manchester, followed by a £1,000 prize for the first flight across the English Channel. Punch magazine thought the idea preposterous and offered £10,000 for the first flight to Mars, but by 1910 both the Mail's prizes had been won. The paper continued to award prizes for aviation sporadically until 1930. Virginia Woolf criticised the Daily Mail as an unreliable newspaper, citing the statement published in the Daily Mail in July 1900 during the Boxer Rebellion that "every one of the Europeans was put to the sword in a most atrocious manner" as the Daily Mail maintained that the entire European community in Beijing had been massacred. A month later in August 1900 the Daily Mail published a story about the relief of the western Legations in Beijing, where the westerners in Beijing together with the thousands of Chinese Christians had been under siege by the Boxers.

Before the outbreak of the First World War, the paper was accused of warmongering when it reported that Germany was planning to crush the British Empire. When war began, Northcliffe's call for conscription was seen by some as controversial, although he was vindicated when conscription was introduced in 1916. In May 1915, Northcliffe criticised Lord Kitchener, the Secretary of State for War, regarding weapons and munitions. Kitchener was considered by some to be a national hero. The paper's circulation dropped from 1,386,000 to 238,000. Fifteen hundred members of the London Stock Exchange burned unsold copies and called for a boycott of the Harmsworth Press. Prime Minister H. H. Asquith accused the paper of being disloyal to the country.

When Kitchener died, the Mail reported it as a great stroke of luck for the British Empire. The paper was critical of Asquith's conduct of the war, and he resigned in December 1916. His successor David Lloyd George asked Northcliffe to be in his cabinet, hoping it would prevent him from criticising the government. Northcliffe declined.

According to Piers Brendon:

Northcliffe's methods made the Mail the most successful newspaper hitherto seen in the history of journalism. But by confusing gewgaws with pearls, by selecting the paltry at the expense of the significant, by confirming atavistic prejudices, by oversimplifying the complex, by dramatising the humdrum, by presenting stories as entertainment and by blurring the difference between news and views, Northcliffe titillated, if he did not debouch, the public mind; he polluted, if he did not poison, the wells of knowledge.

=== Inter-war period ===
==== 1919–1930 ====
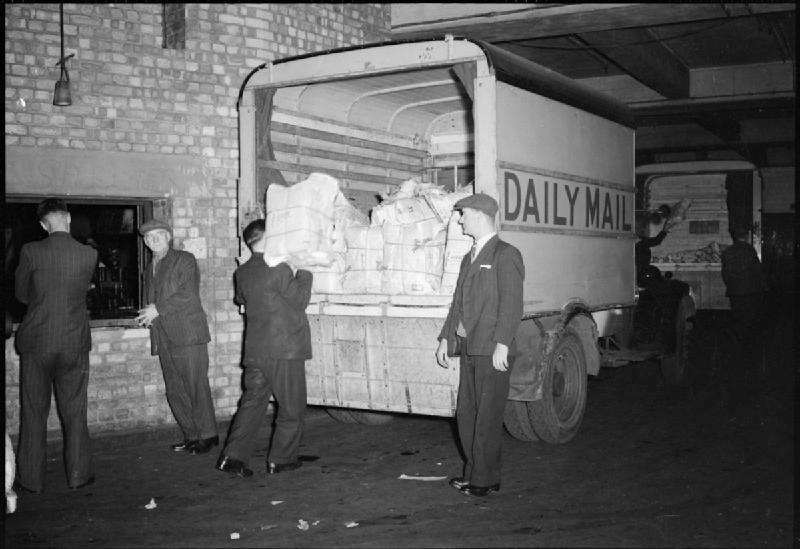
Bundles of newspapers loaded into the back of a Daily Mail van in the early hours for delivery to newsagents in 1944

Light-hearted stunts enlivened Northcliffe, such as the 'Hat campaign' in the winter of 1920. This was a contest with a prize of £100 for a new design of hat – a subject in which Northcliffe took a particular interest. There were 40,000 entries and the winner was a cross between a top hat and a bowler christened the Daily Mail Sandringham Hat. The paper subsequently promoted the wearing of it but without much success.

In 1919, Alcock and Brown made the first flight across the Atlantic, winning a prize of £10,000 from the Daily Mail. In 1930 the Mail made a great story of another aviation stunt, awarding another prize of £10,000 to Amy Johnson for making the first solo flight from England to Australia.

The Daily Mail had begun the Ideal Home Exhibition in 1908. At first, Northcliffe had disdained this as a publicity stunt to sell advertising and he refused to attend. But his wife exerted pressure upon him and he changed his view, becoming more supportive. By 1922 the editorial side of the paper was fully engaged in promoting the benefits of modern appliances and technology to free its female readers from the drudgery of housework. The Mail maintained the event until selling it to Media 10 in 2009. As Lord Northcliffe aged, his grip on the paper slackened and there were periods when he was not involved. His physical and mental health declined rapidly in 1921, and he died in August 1922 at age 57. His brother Lord Rothermere took full control of the paper.

In the Chanak Crisis of 1922, Britain almost went to war with Turkey. The Prime Minister David Lloyd George, supported by the War Secretary Winston Churchill, were determined to go to war over the Turkish demand that the British leave their occupation zone with Churchill sending out telegrams asking for Canada, Australia and New Zealand to all send troops for the expected war. George Ward Price, the "extra-special correspondent" of The Daily Mail was sympathetic towards the beleaguered British garrison at Chanak, but was also sympathetic towards the Turks. Ward Price wrote in his articles that Mustafa Kemal did not have wider ambitions to restore the lost frontiers of the Ottoman Empire and only wanted the Allies to leave Asia Minor. The Daily Mail ran a huge banner headline on 21 September 1922 that stated "Get Out Of Chanak!" In a leader (editorial), the Daily Mail wrote that the views of Churchill, who very much favoured going to war with Turkey, were "bordering on insanity". The same leader noted that Prime Minister William Lyon Mackenzie King of Canada had rejected Churchill's request for troops, which led the leader to warn that Churchill's efforts to call upon the Dominions for help for the expected war were endangering the unity of the British empire.

Rothermere had a fundamentally elitist conception of politics, believing that the natural leaders of Britain were upper class men like himself, and he strongly disapproved of the decision to grant women the right to vote together with the end of the franchise requirements that disfranchised lower-class men. Feeling that British women and lower-class men were not really capable of understanding the issues, Rothermere started to lose faith in democracy. In October 1922, the Daily Mail approved of the Fascist "March on Rome" as the newspaper argued that democracy had failed in Italy, thus requiring Benito Mussolini to set up his Fascist dictatorship to save the social order. In 1923, Rothermere published a leader in The Daily Mail entitled "What Europe Owes Mussolini", where he wrote about his "profound admiration" for Mussolini, whom he praised for "in saving Italy he stopped the inroads of Bolshevism which would have left Europe in ruins...in my judgment he saved the entire Western world. It was because Mussolini overthrew Bolshevism in Italy that it collapsed in Hungary and ceased to gain adherents in Bavaria and Prussia". In 1923, the newspaper supported the Italian occupation of Corfu and condemned the British government for at least rhetorically opposing the Italian attack on Greece.

On 25 October 1924, the Daily Mail published the Zinoviev letter, which indicated Moscow was directing British Communists toward violent revolution. It was later proven to be a hoax. At the time many on the left blamed the letter for the defeat of Ramsay MacDonald's Labour Party in the 1924 general election, held four days later.

Unlike most newspapers, the Mail quickly took up an interest on the new medium of radio. In 1928, the newspaper established an early example of an offshore radio station aboard a yacht, both as a means of self-promotion and as a way to break the BBC's monopoly. However, the project failed as the equipment was not able to provide a decent signal from overboard, and the transmitter was replaced by a set of speakers. The yacht spent the summer entertaining beach-goers with gramophone records interspersed with publicity for the newspaper and its insurance fund. The Mail was also a frequent sponsor on continental commercial radio stations targeted towards Britain throughout the 1920s and 1930s and periodically voiced support for the legalisation of private radio, something that would not happen until 1973.

From 1923, Lord Rothermere and the Daily Mail formed an alliance with the other great press baron, Lord Beaverbrook. Their opponent was the Conservative Party politician and leader Stanley Baldwin. Rothermere in a leader conceded that Fascist methods were "not suited to a country like our own", but qualified his remark with the statement, "if our northern cities became Bolshevik we would need them". In an article in 1927 celebrating five years of Fascism in Italy, it was argued that there were parallels between modern Britain and Italy in the last years of the Liberal era as it was argued Italy had a series of weak liberal and conservative governments that made concessions to the Italian Socialist Party such as granting universal male suffrage in 1912 whose "only result was to hasten the arrival of disorder". In the same article, Baldwin was compared to the Italian prime ministers of the Liberal era as the article argued that the General Strike of 1926 should never have been allowed to occur and the Baldwin government was condemned "for the feebleness which it tries to placate opposition by being more Socialist than the Socialists". In 1928, the Daily Mail in a leader praised Mussolini as "the great figure of the age. Mussolini will probably dominate the history of the twentieth century as Napoleon dominated the early nineteen century".

By 1929, George Ward Price was writing in the Mail that Baldwin should be deposed and Beaverbrook elected as leader. In early 1930, the two Lords launched the United Empire Party, which the Daily Mail supported enthusiastically. Like Lord Beaverbrook, Rothermere was outraged by Baldwin's centre-right style of Conservatism and his decision to respond to almost universal suffrage by expanding the appeal of the Conservative Party. Far from seeing giving women the right to vote as the disaster Rothermere believed that it was, Baldwin set out to appeal to female voters, a tactic that was politically successful, but led Rothermere to accuse Baldwin of "feminising" the Conservative Party.

The rise of the new party dominated the newspaper, and, even though Beaverbrook soon withdrew, Rothermere continued to campaign. Vice Admiral Ernest Augustus Taylor fought the first by-election for the United Empire Party in October, defeating the official Conservative candidate by 941 votes. Baldwin's position was now in doubt, but in 1931 Duff Cooper won the key by-election at St George's, Westminster, beating the United Empire Party candidate, Sir Ernest Petter, supported by Rothermere, and this broke the political power of the press barons.

In 1927, the celebrated picture of the year Morning by Dod Procter was bought by the Daily Mail for the Tate Gallery.

In 1927, Rothermere, under the influence of his Hungarian mistress, Countess Stephanie von Hohenlohe, took up the cause of Hungary as his own, publishing a leader on 21 June 1927 entitled "Hungary's Place in the Sun". In "Hungary's Place in the Sun", he approvingly noted that Hungary was dominated both politically and economically by its "chivalrous and warlike aristocracy", whom he noted in past centuries had battled the Ottoman Empire, leading him to conclude that all of Europe owned a profound debt to the Hungarian aristocracy which had been "Europe's bastion against which the forces of Mahomet [the Prophet Mohammed] vainly hurled themselves against". Rothermere argued that it was unjust that the "noble" Hungarians should be under the rule of "cruder and more barbaric races", by which he meant the peoples of Romania, Czechoslovakia and Yugoslavia. In his leader, he advocated that Hungary retake all of the lands lost under the Treaty of Trianon, which caused immediate concern in Yugoslavia, Czechoslovakia and Romania, where it was believed that his leader reflected British government policy. Additionally, he took up the cause of the Sudeten Germans, stating that the Sudetenland should go to Germany. The Czechoslovak Foreign Minister Edvard Beneš was so concerned that he visited London to meet King George V, a man who detested Rothermere and used language that was so crude, vulgar and "unkingy" that Beneš had to report to Prague that he could not possibly repeat the king's remarks. Rothermere's "Justice for Hungary" campaign, which he continued until February 1939, was a source of disquiet for the Foreign Office, which complained that British relations with Czechoslovakia, Yugoslavia and Romania were constantly stained as the leaders of those nations continued to harbour the belief that Rothermere was in some way speaking for the British government.

One of the major themes of The Daily Mail was the opposition to the Indian independence movement and much of Rothermere's opposition to Baldwin was based upon the belief that Baldwin was not sufficiently opposed to Indian independence. In 1930, Rothermere wrote a series of leaders under the title "If We Lose India!", claiming that granting India independence would be the end of Britain as a great power. In addition, Rothermere predicted that Indian independence would end worldwide white supremacy as inevitably, the peoples of the other British colonies in Asia, Africa, and the Americas would also demand independence. The decision of the Labour Prime Minister Ramsay MacDonald to open the Round Table Conferences in 1930 was greeted by the Daily Mail as the beginning of the end of Britain as a great power. As part of its crusade against Indian independence, The Daily Mail published a series of articles portraying the peoples of India as ignorant, barbarous, filthy and fanatical, arguing that the Raj was necessary to save India from the Indians, whom The Daily Mail argued were not capable of handling independence.

==== 1930–1939 ====
Lord Rothermere was a friend of Benito Mussolini and Adolf Hitler, and directed the Mail's editorial stance towards them in the early 1930s. Lord Rothermere took an extreme anti-Communist line, which led him to own an estate in Hungary to which he might escape to in case Britain was conquered by the Soviet Union. Shortly after the Nazis scored their breakthrough in the Reichstag elections on 14 September 1930, winning 107 seats, Rothermere went to Munich to interview Hitler. In an article published in the Daily Mail on 24 September 1930, Rothermere wrote: "These young Germans have discovered, as I am glad to note that the young men and women of England are discovering, that is no good trusting the old politicians. Accordingly, they have formed, as I should like to see our British youth form, a parliamentary party of their own ... We can do nothing to check this movement [the Nazis], and I believe it would be a blunder for the British people to take up an attitude of hostility towards it." Starting in December 1931, Rothermere opened up talks with Oswald Mosley under which terms the Daily Mail would support his party. The talks were drawn out largely because Mosley understood that Rothermere was a megalomaniac who wanted to use the New Party for his own purposes as he sought to impose terms and conditions in exchange for the support of the Daily Mail. Mosley, who was equally egoistical, wanted Rothermere's support, but only on his own terms.

Rothermere's 1933 leader "Youth Triumphant" praised the new Nazi regime's accomplishments, and was subsequently used as propaganda by them. In it, Rothermere predicted that "The minor misdeeds of individual Nazis would be submerged by the immense benefits the new regime is already bestowing upon Germany". Journalist John Simpson, in a book on journalism, suggested that Rothermere was referring to the violence against Jews and Communists rather than the detention of political prisoners. Alongside his support for Nazi Germany as the "bulwark against Bolshevism", Rothermere used the Daily Mail as a forum to champion his pet cause, namely a stronger Royal Air Force (RAF). Rothermere had decided that aerial war was the technology of the future, and throughout the 1930s the Daily Mail was described as "obsessional" in pressing for more spending on the RAF.

Rothermere and the Mail were also editorially sympathetic to Mosley and the British Union of Fascists. Rothermere wrote an article titled "Hurrah for the Blackshirts!" published in the Daily Mail on 15 January 1934, praising Mosley for his "sound, commonsense, Conservative doctrine", and stating that: "Young men may join the British Union of Fascists by writing to the Headquarters, King's Road, Chelsea, London, S.W." The Spectator condemned Rothermere's article, commenting that "the Blackshirts, like the Daily Mail, appeal to people unaccustomed to thinking. The average Daily Mail reader is a potential Blackshirt ready made. When Lord Rothermere tells his clientele to go and join the Fascists some of them pretty certainly will." In April 1934, the Daily Mail ran a competition entitled "Why I Like The Blackshirts" under which it awarded one pound every week for the best letter from its readers explaining why they liked the BUF. The paper's support ended after violence at a BUF rally in Kensington Olympia in June 1934. Mosley and many others thought Rothermere had responded to pressure from Jewish businessmen who it was believed had threatened to stop advertising in the paper if it continued to back an antisemitic party. The paper editorially continued to oppose the arrival of Jewish refugees escaping Germany, describing their arrival as "a problem to which the Daily Mail has repeatedly pointed".

In December 1934, Rothermere visited Berlin as the guest of Joachim von Ribbentrop. During his visit, Rothermere was publicly thanked in a speech by Josef Goebbels for the Daily Mail's pro-German coverage of the Saarland referendum, under which the people of the Saarland had the choice of voting to remain under the rule of the League of Nations, join France, or rejoin Germany. In March 1935, impressed by the arguments put forward by Ribbentrop for the return of the former German colonies in Africa, Rothermere published a leader entitled "Germany Must Have Elbow Room". In his leader, Rothermere argued that the Treaty of Versailles was too harsh towards the Reich and claimed that the German economy was being crippled by the loss of the German colonial empire in Africa as he argued that without African colonies to exploit that the German economic recovery from the Great Depression was fragile and shallow.

J. F. C. Fuller was Daily Mail's military correspondent in the Italian camp during the Italian invasion of Ethiopia in late 1935. An Italophile member of the British Union of Fascists and the British Union of Friends of Italy, he compared Mussolini's troops to the crusaders and the Hussites.

During the Spanish Civil War, the Daily Mail ran a photo-essay on 27 July 1936 by Ferdinand Tuohy entitled "The Red Carmens, the women who burn churches". Tuohy took a series of photographs of Spanish women who joined the Worker's Militia marching up to the front with rifles and ammunition pouches over their shoulders. In an essay that has been widely criticised as misogynistic, Tuohy wrote: "The Spanish women [sic?] has been a creature to admire or make work domestically, to marry or let slip away into a religious order ... 65 percent were illiterate". Tuohy declared his horror at the young Spanish women had rejected the traditional patriarchal system, writing with disgust that the "direct action girls" of the Worker's Militia do not want to be like their mothers, submissive and obedient to men. Tuohy called these young women "Red Carmens", associating them with the destructive heroine of the opera Carmen and with Communism, writing the "Red Carmens" proved the amorality of the Spanish Republic, which had preached gender equality. For Tuohy, women to fight in a war was to reject their femininity, leading him to label these women as monstrous as he accused the "Red Carmens" of "sexual depravity", writing with utter horror at the possibility of these women engaging in premarital sex, which for him marked the beginning of the end of "civilisation" itself. The British historian Caroline Brothers wrote that Tuohy's article said much about the gender politics of The Daily Mail, which ran his photo-essay and presumably of The Daily Mail's readers who were expected to approve of the article.

In a 1937 article, George Ward Price, the special correspondent of The Daily Mail, approvingly wrote: "The sense of national unity—the Volkgemeinschaft—to which the Führer constantly appeals in his speeches is not a rhetorical invention, but a reality". Ward Price was one of the most controversial British journalists of the 1930s, and one of the few British journalists allowed to interview both Benito Mussolini and Adolf Hitler because both fascist leaders knew that Ward Price could be trusted to take a favourable tone and ask "soft" questions. Wickham Steed called Ward Price "the lackey of Mussolini, Hitler and Rothermere". The British historian Daniel Stone called Ward Price's reporting from Berlin and Rome "a mixture of snobbery, name dropping and obsequious pro-fascism of a most genteel 'English' type". In the 1938 crisis over the Sudetenland, The Daily Mail was very hostile in its picture of President Edvard Beneš, whom Rothermere noted disapprovingly in a leader in July 1938 had signed an alliance with the Soviet Union in 1935, leading him to accuse Beneš of turning "Czechoslovakia into a corridor for Russia against Germany". Rothermere concluded his leader: "If Czechoslovakia becomes involved in a war, the British nation will say to the Prime Minister with one voice: 'Keep out of it!'"

During the Danzig crisis, the Daily Mail was inadvertently used by the German Foreign Minister Joachim von Ribbentrop to persuade Hitler that Britain would not go to war for the defence of Poland. Ribbentrop had the German Embassy in London headed by Herbert von Dirksen provide translations from pro-appeasement newspapers like the Daily Mail and the Daily Express for Hitler's benefit, which had the effect of making it seem that British public opinion was more strongly against going to war for Poland than was actually the case. The British historian Victor Rothwell wrote that the newspapers that Ribbentrop used to provide his press summaries for Hitler, such as the Daily Express and the Daily Mail, were out of touch not only with British public opinion, but also with British government policy in regards to the Danzig crisis. The press summaries Ribbentrop provided were particularly important as Ribbentrop had managed to convince Hitler that the British government secretly controlled the British press, and just as in Germany, nothing appeared in the British press that the British government did not want to appear.

=== Post-war history ===
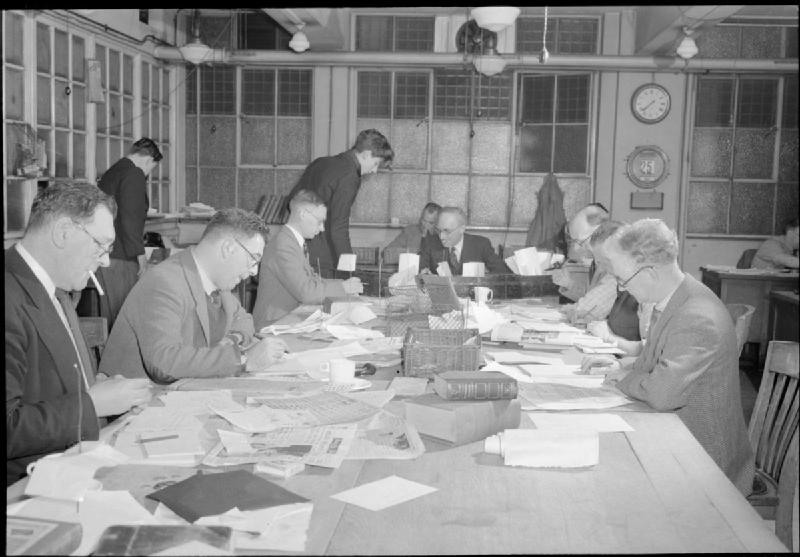
Sub-editor's room at the offices of the Daily Mail newspaper in 1944

On 5 May 1946, the Daily Mail celebrated its Golden Jubilee. Winston Churchill was the chief guest at the banquet and toasted it with a speech. Newsprint rationing in the Second World War had forced the Daily Mail to cut its size to four pages, but the size gradually increased through the 1950s. In 1947, when the Raj ended, the Daily Mail featured a banner headline reading "India: 11 words mark the end of an empire". During the Suez crisis of 1956, the Daily Mail consistently took a hard line against President Gamal Abdel Nasser of Egypt, taking the viewpoint that Britain was justified in invading Egypt to retake control of the Suez canal and topple Nasser.

The Daily Mail was transformed by its editor during the 1970s and 1980s, David English. He had been editor of the Daily Sketch from 1969 to 1971, when it closed. Part of the same group from 1953, the Sketch was absorbed by its sister title, and English became editor of the Mail, a post in which he remained for more than 20 years. English transformed it from a struggling newspaper selling half as many copies as its mid-market rival, the Daily Express, to a formidable publication, whose circulation rose to surpass that of the Express by the mid-1980s. English was knighted in 1982.

The paper enjoyed a period of journalistic success in the 1980s, employing Fleet Street writers such as gossip columnist Nigel Dempster, Lynda Lee-Potter and sportswriter Ian Wooldridge (who unlike some of his colleagues – the paper generally did not support sporting boycotts of white-minority-ruled South Africa – strongly opposed apartheid). In 1982 a Sunday title, the Mail on Sunday, was launched (the Scottish Sunday Mail, now owned by the Mirror Group, was founded in 1919 by the first Lord Rothermere, but later sold).

Knighted in 1982, Sir David English became editor-in-chief and chairman of Associated Newspapers in 1992 after Rupert Murdoch had attempted to hire Evening Standard editor Paul Dacre as editor of The Times. The Evening Standard was then part of the Associated Newspapers group, and Dacre was appointed to succeed English at the Daily Mail as a means of dealing with Murdoch's offer. Dacre retired as editor of the Daily Mail but as of October 2026 remains editor-in-chief of the group.

In late 2013, the paper moved its London printing operation from the city's Docklands area to a new £50 million plant in Thurrock, Essex. There are Scottish editions of both the Daily Mail and Mail on Sunday, with different articles and columnists.

In August 2016, the Daily Mail began a partnership with The People's Daily, the official newspaper of the Chinese Communist Party. This partnership included publishing articles in the MailOnline produced by The People's Daily. The agreement appeared to observers to give the paper an edge in publishing news stories sourced out of China, but it also led to questions of censorship regarding politically sensitive topics.

In November 2016, Lego ended a series of promotions in the paper which had run for years, following a campaign from the group 'Stop Funding Hate', who were unhappy with the Mail's coverage of migrant issues and the EU referendum.

In September 2017, the Daily Mail partnered with Stage 29 Productions to launch DailyMailTV, an international news program produced by Stage 29 Productions in its studios based in New York City with satellite studios in London, Sydney, DC and Los Angeles. Dr. Phil McGraw (Stage 29 Productions) was named as executive producer. The program was nominated for a Daytime Emmy Award for Outstanding Entertainment News Program in 2018.

In May 2020, the Daily Mail ended The Sun's 42-year reign as the United Kingdom's highest-circulation newspaper. The Daily Mail recorded average daily sales of 980,000 copies, with the Mail on Sunday recording weekly sales of 878,000.

In August 2022, the Daily Mail wrote in support of Liz Truss in the July–September 2022 Conservative Party leadership election.

== Scottish, Irish, Continental, and Indian editions ==
=== Scottish Daily Mail ===
The Scottish Daily Mail header

The Scottish Daily Mail was published as a separate title from Edinburgh starting in December 1946. The circulation was poor though, falling to below 100,000 and the operation was rebased to Manchester in December 1968. The Scottish Daily Mail was relaunched in 1995; it is printed in Glasgow. It had an average circulation of 67,900 in the area of Scotland in December 2019.

=== Irish Daily Mail ===
The Daily Mail officially entered the Irish market with the launch of a local version of the paper on 6 February 2006; free copies of the paper were distributed on that day in some locations to publicise the launch. Its masthead differed from that of UK versions by having a green rectangle with the word "IRISH", instead of the Royal Arms, but this was later changed, with "Irish Daily Mail" displayed instead. The Irish version includes stories of Irish interest alongside content from the UK version. According to the Audit Bureau of Circulations, the Irish edition had a circulation of 63,511 for July 2007, falling to an average of 49,090 for the second half of 2009. Since 24 September 2006 Ireland on Sunday, the Irish Sunday newspaper acquired by Associated in 2001, was replaced by an Irish edition of the Mail on Sunday (the Irish Mail on Sunday), to tie in with the weekday newspaper.

=== Continental and Overseas Daily Mail ===
Two foreign editions were begun in 1904 and 1905; the former titled the Overseas Daily Mail, covering the world, and the latter titled the Continental Daily Mail, covering Europe and North Africa.

=== Mail Today ===
The newspaper entered India on 16 November 2007 with the launch of Mail Today, a 48-page compact size newspaper printed in Delhi, Gurgaon and Noida with a print run of 110,000 copies. Based around a subscription model, the newspaper has the same fonts and feel as the Daily Mail and was set up with investment from Associated Newspapers and editorial assistance from the Daily Mail newsroom. The paper alternated between supporting the Congress-led UPA regime as well as the BJP-led NDA regime. Between 2010 and 2014, it supported the Kapil Sibal–led reforms to change the undergraduate structure at the University of Delhi. In 2016, it was the first newspaper to break the controversial story about terror slogans being raised in favour of the hanged terrorist Afzal Guru on his death anniversary at the Jawaharlal Nehru University in Delhi.

== Editorial stance ==
As a right-wing tabloid, the Mail is traditionally a supporter of the Conservative Party. It has endorsed the party in every UK general election since 1945, with the one exception of the October 1974 UK general election, where it endorsed a Liberal and Conservative coalition. While the paper retained its support for the Conservative Party at the 2015 general election, the paper urged conservatively inclined voters to support UKIP in the constituencies of Heywood and Middleton, Dudley North, and Great Grimsby where UKIP was the main challenger to the Labour Party.

On international affairs, regarding the 2008 South Ossetia war between Russia and Georgia, the Mail said that Russia had "behaved with shocking arrogance and brutality", but accused the British government of dragging Britain into an unnecessary confrontation with Russia and of hypocrisy regarding its protests over Russian recognition of Abkhazia and South Ossetia's independence, citing the British government's own recognition of Kosovo's independence from Russia's ally Serbia.

The Mail published an article by Joanna Blythman in 2012 opposing the growing of genetically modified crops in the United Kingdom.

The Daily Mail endorsed voting to leave in the 2016 United Kingdom European Union membership referendum.

== Awards ==
The Daily Mail has been awarded the National Newspaper of the Year for 1994, 1995, 1997, 2000, 2002, 2011, 2016, 2019 and 2020 by the British Press Awards.

Daily Mail journalists have won a range of British Press Awards, including:

- Campaign of the Year (murder of Stephen Lawrence, 2012)
- Website of the Year (Mail Online, 2012)
- News Team of the Year (Daily Mail, 2012)
- Critic of the Year (Quentin Letts, 2010)
- Political Journalist of the Year (Quentin Letts, 2009)
- Specialist Journalist of the Year (Stephen Wright in relation to the Rachel Nickell case, 2009)
- Showbiz Reporter of the Year (Benn Todd, 2012)
- Feature Writer of the Year – Popular (David Jones, 2012)
- Columnist of the Year – Popular (Craig Brown, 2012; Peter Oborne, 2016)
- Best of Humour (Craig Brown, 2012)
- Columnist – Popular (Craig Brown, 2012)
- Sports Reporter of the Year (Jeff Powell, 2005)
- Sports Photographer of the Year (Mike Egerton, 2012; Andy Hooper, 2008, 2010, 2016)
- Cartoonist of the Year (Stanley 'MAC' McMurtry, 2016)
- Interviewer of the Year – Popular (Jan Moir, 2019)
- Columnist of the Year – Popular (Sarah Vine, 2019)
- The Hugh McIlvanney Award for Sports Journalist of the Year (Laura Lambert, 2019)
- Sports News Story (Saracens, 2019)
- News Reporter of the Year (Tom Kelly; jointly with Claire Newell of The Daily Telegraph, 2019)

Other awards include:

- National Political/Government Reporting, Los Angeles Press Club (Josh Boswell, 2023)
- Orwell Prize (Toby Harnden, 2012)
- Hugh Cudlipp Award (2012; Stephen Wright/Richard Pendlebury, 2009; 2007)

== Noted reporting ==
=== Suffragette ===
The term "suffragette" was first used in 1906, as a term of derision by the journalist Charles E. Hands in the Mail to describe activists in the movement for women's suffrage, in particular members of the WSPU. However, the women he intended to ridicule embraced the term, saying "suffraGETtes" (hardening the 'g'), implying not only that they wanted the vote, but that they intended to 'get' it.

=== Zinoviev Letter ===
In 1924, the Daily Mail published a letter before the elections in Britain. The letter was purportedly written by Grigory Zinoviev to call for Bolshevik-like revolution in UK. The letter is now believed to have been a forgery (not by the Mail).

=== Holes in the road ===
On 17 January 1967, the Mail published a story, "The holes in our roads", about potholes, giving the examples of Blackburn where it said there were 4,000 holes. This detail was then immortalised by John Lennon in The Beatles song "A Day in the Life", along with an account of the death of 21-year-old socialite Tara Browne in a car crash on 18 December 1966, which also appeared in the same issue.

=== Unification Church ===
In 1981, the Daily Mail ran an investigation into the Unification Church, nicknamed the Moonies, accusing them of ending marriages and brainwashing converts. The Unification Church, which always denied these claims, sued for libel but lost heavily. A jury awarded the Mail a then record-breaking £750,000 libel payout (equivalent to £2,891,322 in 2025). In 1983 the paper won a special British Press Award for a "relentless campaign against the malignant practices of the Unification Church."

=== Gay gene controversy ===
On 16 July 1993, the Mail ran the headline "Abortion hope after 'gay genes' finding". Of the tabloid headlines which commented on the Xq28 gene, the Mail's was criticised as "perhaps the most infamous and disturbing headline of all".

=== Stephen Lawrence ===
The Mail campaigned vigorously for justice over the murder of Stephen Lawrence in 1993. On 14 February 1997, the Mail front page pictured the five men accused of Lawrence's murder with the headline "MURDERERS", stating "if we are wrong, let them sue us". This attracted praise from Paul Foot and Peter Preston. Some journalists contended the Mail had belatedly changed its stance on the Lawrence murder, with the newspaper's earlier focus being the alleged opportunistic behaviour of anti-racist groups ("How Race Militants Hijacked a Tragedy", 10 May 1993) and alleged insufficient coverage of the case (20 articles in three years).

Two men who the Mail had featured in their "Murderers" headline were found guilty in 2012 of murdering Lawrence. After the verdict, Lawrence's parents and numerous political figures thanked the newspaper for taking the potential financial risk involved with the 1997 headline.

=== Stephen Gately ===
On 16 October 2009, a Jan Moir article criticised aspects of the life and death of Stephen Gately. It was published six days after his death and before his funeral. The Press Complaints Commission received over 25,000 complaints, a record number, regarding the timing and content of the article. It was criticised as insensitive, inaccurate and homophobic. The Press Complaints Commission did not uphold complaints about the article. Major advertisers, such as Marks & Spencer, had their adverts removed from the Mail Online webpage containing Moir's article.

=== Cannabis use ===
On 13 June 2011, a study by Matt Jones and Michal Kucewicz on the effects of cannabinoid receptor activation in the brain was published in The Journal of Neuroscience and the British medical journal The Lancet. The study was used in articles by CBS News and Le Figaro, among others.

In October 2011, the Daily Mail printed an article citing the research, titled "Just ONE cannabis joint can bring on schizophrenia as well as damaging memory." The group Cannabis Law Reform (CLEAR), which campaigns for ending drug prohibition, criticised the Daily Mail report. Matt Jones, co-author of the study, said he was "disappointed but not surprised" by the article, and stated: "This study does NOT say that one spliff will bring on schizophrenia". Dorothy Bishop, professor of neuroscience at Oxford University, in her blog awarded the Daily Mail the "Orwellian Prize for Journalistic Misrepresentation", The Mail later changed the article's headline to: "Just ONE cannabis joint 'can cause psychiatric episodes similar to schizophrenia' as well as damaging memory."

=== Ralph Miliband article ===
In September 2013, the Mail was criticised for an article on Ralph Miliband (late father of then Labour-leader Ed Miliband and prominent Marxist sociologist), titled "The Man Who Hated Britain". Ed Miliband said that the article was "ludicrously untrue", that he was "appalled" and "not willing to see my father's good name be undermined in this way". Ralph Miliband had arrived in the UK from Belgium as a Jewish refugee from the Holocaust. The Jewish Chronicle described the article as "a revival of the 'Jews can't be trusted because of their divided loyalties' genre of antisemitism." Conservative MP Zac Goldsmith linked the article to the Nazi sympathies of the 1st Viscount Rothermere, whose family remain the paper's owners.

The paper defended the article's general content in an editorial, but described its use of a picture of Ralph Miliband's grave as an "error of judgement". In the editorial, the paper further remarked that "We do not maintain, like the jealous God of Deuteronomy, that the iniquity of the fathers should be visited on the sons. But when a son with prime ministerial ambitions swallows his father's teachings, as the younger Miliband appears to have done, the case is different." A spokesman for the paper also described claims that the article continued its history of antisemitism as "absolutely spurious." However, the reference to "the jealous God of Deuteronomy" was criticised by Jonathan Freedland, who said that "In the context of a piece about a foreign-born Jew, [the remark] felt like a subtle, if not subterranean hint to the reader, a reminder of the ineradicable alienness of this biblically vengeful people" and that "those ready to acquit the Mail because there was no bald, outright statement of antisemitism were probably using the wrong measure."

=== Gawker Media lawsuit ===
In March 2015, James King, a former contract worker at the Mail's New York office, wrote an article for Gawker titled 'My Year Ripping Off the Web With the Daily Mail Online'. In the article, King alleged that the Mail's approach was to rewrite stories from other news outlets with minimal credit in order to gain advertising clicks, and that staffers had published material they knew to be false. He also suggested that the paper preferred to delete stories from its website rather than publish corrections or admit mistakes.

In September 2015, the Mail's US company Mail Media filed a $1 million lawsuit against King and Gawker Media for libel. Erik Wemple at The Washington Post questioned the value of the lawsuit, stating that "Whatever the merits of King's story, it didn't exactly upend conventional wisdom" about the website's strategy. In November 2016, Lawyers for Gawker filed a motion to resolve the lawsuit. Under the terms of the motion, Gawker was not required to pay any financial compensation, but agreed to add an Editor's Note at the beginning of the King article, remove an illustration in the post which incorporated the Daily Mail's logo, and publish a statement by DailyMail.com in the same story.

=== Anti-refugee cartoon ===
Following the November 2015 Paris attacks, a cartoon in the Daily Mail by Stanley McMurtry ("Mac") linked the European migrant crisis (with a focus on Syria in particular) to the terrorist attacks, and criticised the European Union immigration laws for allowing Islamist radicals to gain easy access into the United Kingdom. Despite being compared to Nazi propaganda, and criticised as racist, the cartoon received praise on the Mail Online website. A Daily Mail spokesperson told The Independent: "We are not going to dignify these absurd comments which wilfully misrepresent this cartoon apart from to say that we have not received a single complaint from any reader". Kate Allen, director of Amnesty International UK, criticised the Daily Mail's cartoon for being "reckless xenophobia".

=== Anthony Weiner scandal ===
In September 2016, the Mail Online published a lengthy interview and screenshots from a 15-year-old girl who claimed that the American politician Anthony Weiner had sent her sexually explicit images and messages. The revelation led to Weiner and his wife Huma Abedin – an aide of Hillary Clinton – separating. Weiner pleaded guilty in May 2017 to sending obscene material to a minor, and in September he was jailed for 21 months.

=== Campaigns against plastic pollution ===
The paper has campaigned against plastic pollution in various forms since 2008. The paper called for a levy on single use plastic bags. The Daily Mail's work in highlighting the issue of plastic pollution was praised by the head of the United Nations Environment Program, Erik Solheim at a conference in Kenya in 2017. Emily Maitlis, the newscaster, asked Green Party leader Caroline Lucas on Newsnight, 'Is the biggest friend to the Environment at the moment the Daily Mail?' in reference to the paper's call for a ban on plastic microbeads and other plastic pollution, and suggested it had done more for the environment than the Green Party. Environment group ClientEarth has also highlighted the paper's role in drawing attention to the plastic pollution problem along with the Blue Planet II documentary.

=== Gary McKinnon deportation ===
Attempts by the United States government to extradite Gary McKinnon, a British computer hacker, were campaigned against by the paper. In 2002, McKinnon was accused of perpetrating the "biggest military computer hack of all time" although McKinnon himself states that he was merely looking for evidence of free energy suppression and a cover-up of UFO activity and other technologies potentially useful to the public. The Daily Mail began to support McKinnon's campaign in 2009 – with a series of front-page stories protesting against his deportation.

On 16 October 2012, after a series of legal proceedings in Britain, Home Secretary Theresa May withdrew her extradition order to the United States. Gary McKinnon's mother Janis Sharp praised the paper's contribution to saving her son from deportation in her book in which she said: 'Thanks to Theresa May, David Cameron and the support of David Burrowes and so many others – notably the Daily Mail – my son was safe, he was going to live.'

=== Abd Ali Hameed al-Waheed ===
In December 2017, the Daily Mail published a front-page story entitled "Another human rights fiasco!", with the subheading "Iraqi 'caught red-handed with bomb' wins £33,000 – because our soldiers kept him in custody for too long". The story related to a judge's decision to award money to Abd Ali Hameed al-Waheed after he had been unlawfully imprisoned. The headline was printed despite the fact that during the trial itself the judge concluded that claims that al-Waheed had been caught with a bomb were "pure fiction".

In July 2018, the Independent Press Standards Organisation ordered the paper to publish a front-page correction after finding the newspaper had breached rules on accuracy in its reporting of the case. The Daily Mail reported that a major internal investigation was conducted following the decision to publish the story, and as a result, "strongly worded disciplinary notes were sent to seven senior members of staff", which made it clear "that if errors of the same nature were to happen again, their careers would be at risk".

=== Doctored image of Korean soldiers in Ukraine ===
On 4 December 2024, the Daily Mail published an online story about the Russo-Ukrainian War under the headline "Kim Jong Un sends North Korean women to fight as cannon fodder for Putin in Ukraine". The story was accompanied by a photo of what appeared to be two Korean women in combat fatigues. It was later revealed that the photo was an older image of two Russian soldiers whose facial features had been doctored to appear Korean. According to Mediaite, the Daily Mail "received backlash and ridicule on social media before it removed the article and issued a correction notice".

== Lawsuits ==
- 2017, Daily Mail editor Paul Dacre threatened the website Byline Investigates with legal action and insisted on the removal of three articles about the Daily Mail's use of private investigator Steve Whittamore.
- On 15 November 2019, Byline Investigates published court documents of a lawsuit filed by Meghan Markle against the Daily Mail in which she accused the newspaper of a campaign of "untrue" stories.

=== Successful lawsuits against the Mail ===
- 2001, February: Businessman Alan Sugar was awarded £100,000 in damages following a story commenting on his stewardship of Tottenham Hotspur Football Club.
- 2003, October: Actress Diana Rigg was awarded £30,000 in damages over a story commenting on aspects of her personality.
- 2006, May: Musician Elton John received £100,000 damages following false accusations concerning his manners and behaviour.
- 2009, January: £30,000 award to Austen Ivereigh, who had worked for Cardinal Cormac Murphy-O'Connor, following false accusations made by the newspaper concerning abortion.
- 2010, July: £47,500 award to Parameswaran Subramanyam for falsely claiming that he secretly sustained himself with hamburgers during a 23-day hunger strike in Parliament Square to draw attention to the protests against the Sri Lankan Civil War in 2009.
- 2011, November: the former lifestyle adviser Carole Caplin received damages over claims in the Mail that she would reveal intimate details about former clients.
- 2014, May: Author J. K. Rowling received "substantial damages" and the Mail printed an apology. The newspaper had made a false claim about Rowling's story written for the website of Gingerbread, a single parents' charity.
- 2017, April: First Lady of the United States, Melania Trump, received an undisclosed settlement over claims in the Mail that she had worked as an escort in the 1990s. In September 2016, she began litigation against the Daily Mail for an article which discussed escort allegations. The article included rebuttals and said that there was no evidence to support the allegations. The Mail regretted any misinterpretation that could have come from reading the article, and retracted it from its website. Melania Trump filed a lawsuit in Maryland, suing for $150 million. On 7 February 2017, the lawsuit was re-filed in the correct jurisdiction, New York, where the Daily Mail's parent company has offices, seeking damages of at least $150 million.
- 2018, June: Earl Spencer accepted undisclosed libel damages from Associated Newspapers over a claim that he acted in an "unbrotherly, heartless and callous way" towards his sister Diana, Princess of Wales.
- 2019, June: Associated Newspapers paid £120,000 in damages plus costs to Interpal, a UK-based charity which the Mail falsely accused of funding a "hate festival" in Palestine which acted out the murder of Jews.
- 2020, November: The Mail agreed to pay libel damages of £25,000 and apologised for distress caused to University of Cambridge professor Priyamvada Gopal, who they had falsely claimed "was attempting to incite an aggressive and potentially violent race war".
- 2020, December: The Mail paid businessman James Dyson and his wife Lady Deirdre Dyson £100,000 in libel damages after suggesting they had behaved badly towards their former housekeeper.
- 2021, January: Associated Newspapers paid damages and apologised to a British Pakistani couple about whom they had made false allegations in relation to their work as counter-extremism experts.
- 2021, May: Associated Newspapers paid substantial damages and apologised after revealing the identity of a complainant in a rape case against film director Luc Besson.

=== Unsuccessful lawsuits ===
- 1981, April: The Daily Mail won £750,000 from the Unification Church, which had sued for libel due to articles about the Church's recruitment methods. Margaret Singer, professor of psychiatry at the University of California, Berkeley, testified that the Mail's accounts of these methods were accurate. The trial lasted over five months, one of Britain's longest-ever civil trials.
- 2012, February: Nathaniel Rothschild lost his libel case against the Daily Mail, after the High Court agreed that he was indeed the "Puppet Master" for Peter Mandelson, that his conduct had been "inappropriate in a number of respects" and that the words used by the Daily Mail were "substantially true".
- 2012, May: Carina Trimingham, the partner of former Secretary of State for Energy and Climate Change Chris Huhne, was ordered to pay more than £400,000 after she lost her High Court claims for damages for alleged breach of privacy and harassment against the Daily Mail. Huhne, whilst married, had an affair with Trimingham – who herself was in a lesbian civil partnership – and then later left his wife Vicky Pryce for Trimingham. This and a series of other events involving Pryce and Huhne led to his resignation from the Cabinet, and to both of them being arrested for perverting the course of justice and the criminal prosecution R v Huhne and Pryce.
- 2021: Former US congress representative Katie Hill was judicially ordered to reimburse the Daily Mail and others $220,000 for legal fees incurred defending themselves against baseless revenge porn claims raised by Hill.
- 2026: Prince Harry and six others including Elton John and Doreen Lawrence lost a privacy case against the publisher of Daily Mail and Mail on Sunday, with the allegation that the papers used illegal methods to obtain information for their news stories on them. The judge concluded that the claimants relied on suspicion and failed to provide proof of their allegations. The legal bill was expected to cost the claimants up to £50 million.

=== Legal action by the Daily Mail ===
In March 2021, Associated Newspapers issued a letter to ViacomCBS to remove an image of a purported Daily Mail headline from Oprah with Meghan and Harry. The headline seen was "Meghan's seed will taint our Royal Family", which had been edited to remove the context that it was a quotation by an unrelated politician.

== Criticism ==
=== Paying for footage under investigation ===
In 2015, following the November 2015 Paris attacks, the French police viewed the footage of the attacks from the CCTV system of La Casa Nostra. After making a copy on a USB flash drive, the police ordered a technician from the CCTV company that installed the system to encrypt the footage, saying 'this now falls under the confidentiality of the investigation, it must remain here'. Freelance journalist Djaffer Ait Aoudia told The Guardian that he secretly filmed a Daily Mail representative negotiating with the owner to sell the CCTV footage of the attacks. The café owner agreed to supply the footage for €50,000 and asked an IT technician to make the footage accessible again. The Daily Mail responded: "There is nothing controversial about the Mail's acquisition of this video, a copy of which the police already had in their possession." The Guardian also, briefly, embedded the footage on their own website before removing it.

=== Byline removal ===
In 2017, evoke.ie, the Daily Mail's showbiz site, was reported to the internship program of Dublin City University after the bylines of hundreds of articles written by students were changed.

=== Sensationalism ===
The newspaper has also been criticised for its extent of coverage of celebrities, the children of celebrities, property prices, and the depiction of asylum seekers, the latter of which was discussed in the Parliament's Joint Committee on Human Rights in 2007.

=== Reliability ===
The Daily Mail's medical and science journalism has been criticised by some doctors and scientists, accusing it of using minor studies to generate scare stories or being misleading. Ben Goldacre, writing in The Guardian, said that the Daily Mail have an "ongoing project to divide all the inanimate objects in the world into ones that either cause or prevent cancer".

Carbon Brief complained to the Press Complaints Commission about an article published in the Daily Mail titled "Hidden green tax in fuel bills: How a £200 stealth charge is slipped on to your gas and electricity bills" because the £200 figure was unexplained, unreferenced and, according to Ofgem, incorrect. The Daily Mail quietly removed the article from their website.

In 2013, the Met Office criticised an article about climate change in the Daily Mail by James Delingpole for containing "a series of factual inaccuracies". The Daily Mail in response published a letter from the Met Office chairman on its letters page, as well as offering to append the letter to Delingpole's article.

In August 2018, the Mail Online deleted a lengthy news article titled "Powder Keg Paris" by journalist Andrew Malone which focused on "illegal migrants" living in the Paris suburb of Saint Denis, after a string of apparent inaccuracies were highlighted on social media by French activist Marwan Muhammad, including mistaking Saint-Denis, the city, for Seine-Saint-Denis, the department northeast of Paris. Local councillor Majid Messaoudene said that the article had set out to "stigmatise" and "harm" the area and its people. The journalist, Andrew Malone, subsequently deleted his Twitter account. In 2019, the IPSO ruled against the Daily Mail and confirmed in its ruling that the article was inaccurate.

In early 2019, the mobile version of the Microsoft Edge web browser started warning visitors to the MailOnline site, via its NewsGuard plugin, that "this website generally fails to maintain basic standards of accuracy and accountability" and "has been forced to pay damages in numerous high-profile cases". In late January 2019, the status of the MailOnline was changed by the NewsGuard Plugin from Red to Green, updating its verdict to "this website generally maintains basic standards of accuracy and accountability". An Editor's Note from NewsGuard stated that "This label now has the benefit of the dailymail.co.uk's input and our view is that in some important respects their objections are right and we were wrong".

==== Wikipedia determination of unreliability ====
In February 2017, after a formal community discussion, editors on the English Wikipedia banned the use of the Daily Mail as a source in most cases. Its use as a reference is now "generally prohibited, especially when other more reliable sources exist", and it can no longer be used as proof of notability. The Daily Mail can still be used as a source in an about-self fashion, when the Daily Mail itself is the subject of discussion. Support for the ban centered on "the Daily Mail's reputation for poor fact checking, sensationalism, and flat-out fabrication". Some users opposed the decision, arguing that it is "actually reliable for some subjects" and "may have been more reliable historically." The Daily Mail thus became the first deprecated source.

Wikipedia's ban of the Daily Mail generated a significant amount of media attention, especially from the British media. Though the Daily Mail strongly contested this decision by the community, Wikipedia's co-founder Jimmy Wales backed the community's choice, saying: "I think what [the Daily Mail has] done brilliantly in this ad funded world, they've mastered the art of clickbait, they've mastered the art of hyped-up headlines. They've also mastered the art of—I'm sad to say—of running stories that simply aren't true. And that's why Wikipedia decided not to accept them as a source anymore. It's very problematic, they get very upset when we say this, but it's just fact." A February 2017 editorial in The Times on the decision said: "Newspapers make errors and have the responsibility to correct them. Wikipedia editors' fastidiousness, however, appears to reflect less a concern for accuracy than dislike of the Daily Mail's opinions." Slate writer Will Oremus said the decision "should encourage more careful sourcing across Wikipedia while doubling as a richly deserved rebuke to a publication that represents some of the worst forces in online news."

In 2018, the Wikipedia community reaffirmed the Daily Mail's deprecation as a source. In November 2020, Daily Mail sister paper The Mail on Sunday was also deprecated.

=== Racism accusations ===
There have been accusations of racism against the Daily Mail. In 2012, in an article for The New Yorker, former Mail reporter Brendan Montague criticised the Mail's content and culture, stating: "None of the front-line reporters I worked with were racist, but there's institutional racism [at the Daily Mail]".

In August 2020, a group of Palm Islanders in Queensland, Australia, lodged a complaint with the Australian Human Rights Commission under Section 18C of the Racial Discrimination Act 1975 against the Daily Mail and 9News, alleging that they had broadcast and published reports that were inaccurate and racist about the Indigenous Australian recipients of compensation after the Palm Island Class Action.

== Supplements and features ==
- City & Finance: The business part of the Daily Mail, featuring City news and the results from the London Stock Exchange. It also has its own award-winning website called This is Money, which describes itself as the "money section of the MailOnline."
- Travelmail: Contains travel articles, advertisements etc.
- Femail: Femail is an extensive part of the Daily Mail's newspaper and website, being one of four main features on MailOnline others being News, TV & Showbiz and Sport. It is designed for women.
- Weekend: The Daily Mail Weekend is a TV guide published by the Daily Mail, included free with the Mail every Saturday. Weekend magazine, launched in October 1993, is issued free with the Saturday Daily Mail. The guide does not use a magazine-type layout but chooses a newspaper style similar to the Daily Mail itself. In April 2007, the Weekend had a major revamp. A feature changed during the revamp was a dedicated Freeview channel page.

=== Regular cartoon strips ===
- Garfield
- I Don't Believe It (discontinued)
- Odd Streak
- The Strip Show
- Chloe and Co. (by Knight Features)
- Up and Running (by Knight Features)
- Fred Basset

Up and Running is a strip distributed by Knight Features and Fred Basset has followed the life of the dog of the same name in a two-part strip in the Daily Mail since 8 July 1963.

The long-running Teddy Tail cartoon strip, was first published on 5 April 1915 and was the first cartoon strip in a British newspaper. It ran for over 40 years to 1960, spawning the Teddy Tail League Children's Club and many annuals from 1934 to 1942 and again from 1949 to 1962. Teddy Tail was a mouse, with friends Kitty Puss (a cat), Douglas Duck and Dr. Beetle. Teddy Tail is always shown with a knot in his tail.

=== Year Book ===
The Daily Mail Year Book first appeared in 1901, summarising the news of the past year in one volume of 200 to 400 pages. Among its editors were Percy L. Parker (1901–1905), David Williamson (1914–1951), G. B. Newman (1955–1977), Mary Jenkins (1978–1986), P.J. Failes (1987), and Michael and Caroline Fluskey (1991).

=== Online media ===
The majority of content appearing in the Daily Mail and Mail on Sunday printed newspapers also forms part of that included in the MailOnline website. MailOnline is free to read and funded by advertising. In 2011 MailOnline was the second most visited English-language newspaper website worldwide. It has since then become the most visited newspaper website in the world, with over 189.5 million visitors per month, and 11.7 million visitors daily, as of January 2014.

Thailand's military junta blocked the MailOnline in May 2014 after the site revealed a video of Thailand's Crown Prince and his wife, Princess Srirasmi, partying. The video appears to show the allegedly topless princess, a former waitress, in a tiny G-string as she feeds her pet dog cake to celebrate its birthday.

== The Daily Mail in pop culture ==
In 1966 The Beatles released the song Paperback Writer in which the protagonist worked for the Daily Mail. Discussing Paperback Writer with Alan Smith of the NME that year, McCartney recalled that he and John Lennon wrote the lyrics in the form of a letter beginning with "Dear Sir or Madam", but that the song was not inspired by "any real-life characters". However, according to a 2007 piece in The New Yorker, McCartney said he started writing the song in 1965 after reading in the Daily Mail about an aspiring author, "possibly Martin Amis" (who would have been a teenager at the time). The Daily Mail was Lennon's regular newspaper and copies were in Lennon's Weybridge home when Lennon and McCartney were writing songs.

The Daily Mail has appeared in several novels. These include Evelyn Waugh's 1938 novel Scoop which was based on Waugh's experiences as a writer for the Daily Mail. In the book the newspaper is renamed The Daily Beast.

The newspaper appeared in Nicci French's 2008 novel The Memory Game, a psychological thriller.

In 2015, it featured in Laurence Simpson's comic novel about the tabloid media, According to The Daily Mail.

== Editors ==
- 1896: S. J. Pryor
- 1899: Thomas Marlowe
- 1922: W. G. Fish
- 1930: Oscar Pulvermacher
- 1930: William McWhirter
- 1931: W. L. Warden
- 1935: Arthur Cranfield
- 1939: Bob Prew
- 1944: Sidney Horniblow
- 1947: Frank Owen
- 1950: Guy Schofield
- 1955: Arthur Wareham
- 1959: William Hardcastle
- 1963: Mike Randall
- 1966: Arthur Brittenden
- 1971: David English
- 1992: Paul Dacre
- 2018: Geordie Greig
- 2021: Ted Verity

== See also ==
- 1910 London to Manchester air race
- Ideal Home Show
- News Chronicle, formed by the merger of the Daily Chronicle and The Daily News, absorbed by the Daily Mail in 1960
