= Arthur Wareham =

British newspaper editor

Arthur Wareham (24 April 1908 – 10 May 1988) was a British newspaper editor.

Wareham attended Queen's College, Taunton, then entered journalism with the Western Morning News. In 1935 he moved to the Daily Mail, rising to become editor in 1955. As editor, he reversed the drive of previous editor Guy Schofield to imitate The Daily Telegraph, instead taking the paper in a more populist direction.

He was replaced as editor in 1959 and left the newspaper the following year to found a public relations company, Arthur Wareham Associates Ltd.

Media offices
Preceded by Guy Schofield	Editor of the Daily Mail; 1955–1959	Succeeded by William Hardcastle
