= George Ward Price =

British journalist (1886–1961)

G. Ward Price
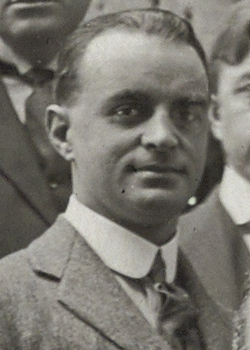
- Ward Price in May 1919
- Born: 17 February 1886
- Died: 22 August 1961 (aged 75)
- Education: St Catharine's College, Cambridge
- Occupation: Journalist
- Employer: Daily Mail
- Father: Rev. H. Ward Price

George Ward Price (17 February 1886 – 22 August 1961) was a journalist who worked as a foreign correspondent for the Daily Mail newspaper.

== Early life and career ==
Price was born to the Reverend Henry Ward Price in 1886 and attended St Catharine's College, Cambridge.

== Journalism ==
After having some articles published by The Captain magazine, Price wrote to the Daily Mail asking to have a proposed walk across Europe financed. The proposed articles were turned down but Price was taken on as a reporter, "paid by results". After a year this arrangement resulted in him being given a five-year contract.

Colonel Sherbrooke-Walker recalled Price in this period when he came to report on a Scout camp at Wisley:

Tall, bronzed, handsome and monocled, with his duelling scar, the soul of kindness and with a delightfully dry sense of humour he at once became a boyhood's hero and the fun and entertainment he contrived for his friends' young brother will never be forgotten.

== Foreign correspondent ==
In 1910 he reported from Turkey and the First Balkan War. Following this, Price became the Daily Mail's Paris correspondent at the age of 26. His reporting of the Balkan wars made his reputation as a journalist. The assassination of Archduke Franz Ferdinand saw Price dispatched to Vienna to report on the funeral.

== First World War ==
The outbreak of the First World War saw Price return to Turkey to cover the Gallipoli campaign on behalf of the Newspaper Proprietors Association members.

Following the evacuation, he wrote:

Although Suvla and Anzac have cost us much in blood, it would be a mistake to regard this withdraw as a confession of entire failure there. Both are names that will take a proud place in the list of the Battle Honours of our Imperial Army, for British troops from the farthest separated parts of the Empire there met and fought, not Turk and German alone, but disease and thirst, the heat of summer and the deadly bitter blizzards of winter.

After covering the evacuation which ended the campaign he moved to the Salonika front. The Armée d'Orient based in Thessaloniki was one of the more colourful forces in World War One, being made up of French, British, Indian, Vietnamese, Serb, Italian, Senegalese, Russian and Greek soldiers. Feeling things had quietened there he redeployed to the Italian Front and witnessed the retreat from Caporetto. In 1918, Ward Price published his first book, The Story of the Salonica Army, recounting his adventures with the Armée d'Orient.

He turned down a CBE for his wartime reporting, preferring to wait until combatants had been honoured.

== Extra-Special Correspondent ==
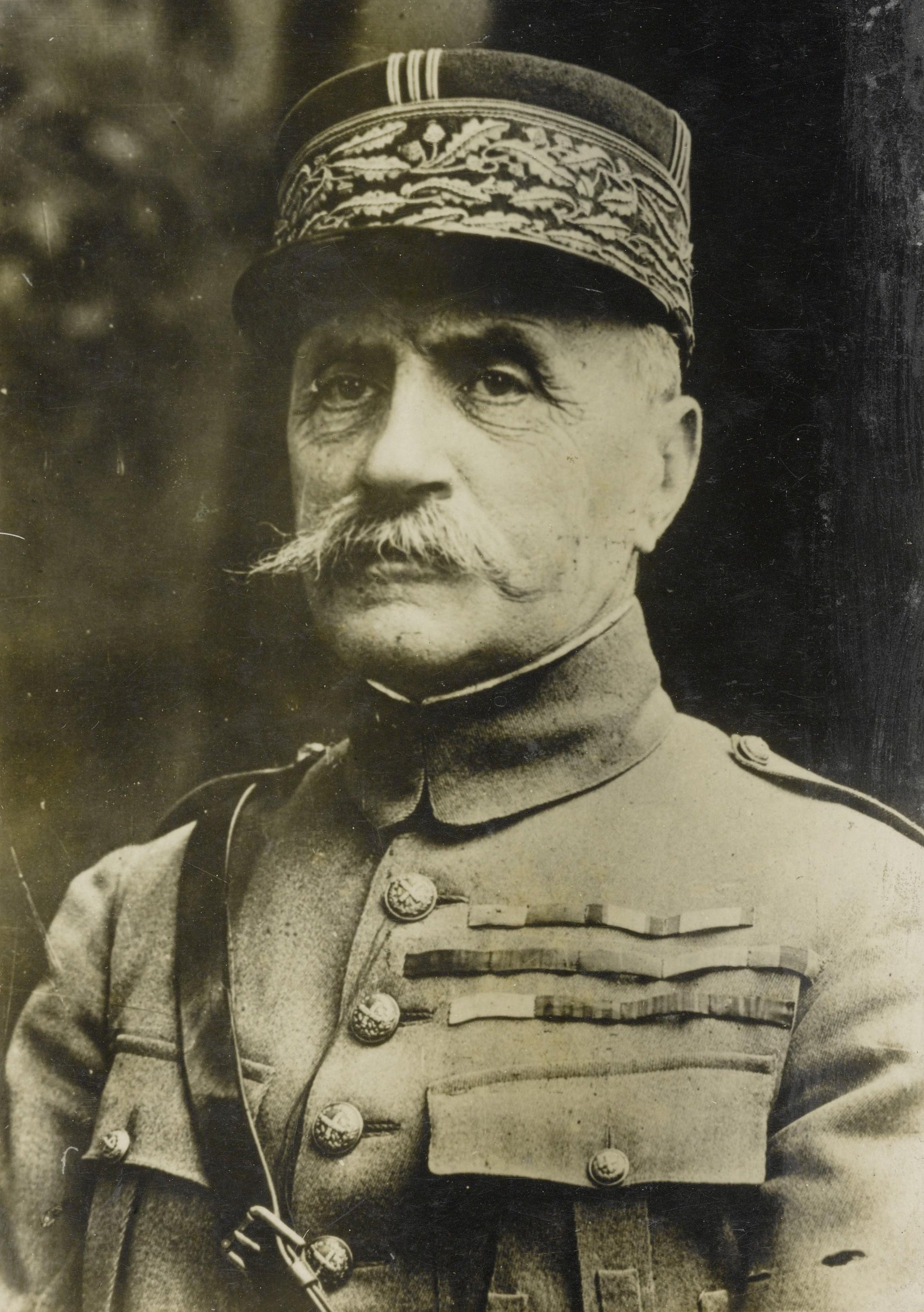
French general and statesman Marshal Foch (photographed between 1914 and 1918), whom Ward Price interviewed in 1919

In November 1918, in the coffee room in the Pera Palace hotel in Constantinople (modern Istanbul), Ward Price first met General Mustafa Kemal of the Ottoman Army. Kemal's role as a commander of a division at the Battle of Gallipoli in 1915 had made him into a popular Ottoman war hero, and Ward Price was the first British journalist to interview the future president of Turkey. Kemal, who already had political ambitions, wanted to appeal directly to the people of Britain via Ward Price to seek a "soft peace" with the recently defeated Ottoman Empire. In his 1957 memoirs Extra Special Correspondent, Ward Price claimed that Kemal offered his services to the British against the French in exchange for a magnanimous peace. The British historian Andrew Mango wrote that if this offer was indeed made, it was as an attempt to divide the Allies as it known that the British, French, Greeks and Italians all had rival ambitions to seize as much of Asia Minor for themselves as possible. Through the British government ignored the interview, the connection with Kemal was to prove beneficial to Ward Price's career. Refusing to accept the Allied plans to partition Asia Minor, Kemal went in May 1919 to the interior of Anatolia to organise the Ottoman army, which had been defeated, but not destroyed, to wage a war of resistance. As the only British journalist who knew Kemal, Ward Price enjoyed access to the leader of the Turkish National Movement.

In 1919, Price attended the meetings in Paris that paved the way for the Treaty of Versailles. Here he interviewed French general and statesman Marshal Foch for what became a four-column piece. In 1920–1922, Britain supported Greece during the Greco-Turkish War. Sir Nevile Henderson, the British Deputy Commissioner for the British occupied zone in Turkey, complained about Ward Price's pro-Turkish articles, charging he "dropped like a vulture from the sky" on any news story. Kemal chose as his capital Ankara, which rapidly became overcrowded with his supporters. The first Western journalist to go to Ankara was the French journalist Berthe Georges-Gaulis who went there in 1920 to interview Kemal, for which she was formally thanked by the Turkish government. Ward Price was the first British journalist to go to Ankara, where he complained that "mutton was the invariable dish and it had the unmistakable flavour of goat...For three weeks, I lived almost entirely on eggs and yoghurt, the highest point of my egg consumption reaching the figure of a dozen per day".

In September 1922, following the victory of Turkey over Greece, the mostly Greek city of Smyrna (modern İzmir) was taken by the Turks, and starting on 13 September 1922 the city was destroyed in an orgy of looting, arson, rape and murder as part of the "homogenisation" of Asia Minor. Ward Price from the safety of a British warship anchored in the Aegean Sea witnessed the sack of Smyrna, writing in the Daily Mail:

"What I see as I stand on the deck of the Iron Guard is an unbroken wall of fire, two miles long, in which twenty distinct volcanoes of raging fire are throwing up jagged, writhing tongues to a height of hundred feet...The sea glows a deep, copper red and, worst of all, from the densely pack mob of thousands of refugees huddled on the narrow quay, between the advancing fiery death behind and the deep water in front, comes continuously such frantic screaming of sheer terror as can be head miles away".

After the Turks defeated the Greeks in September 1922, Kemal turned his victorious army in the direction of the British occupation zone, making it very clear that he wanted to the British to leave Anatolia immediately. On 12 September 1922, Ward Price interviewed Kemal in French (their only common language as Kemal spoke no English while Ward Price spoke no Turkish). Kemal's main point in the interview was that he wanted the British to leave Asia Minor, but that he was otherwise well disposed towards Britain. Kemal told Ward Price: "The frontiers we claim for Turkey exclude Syria and Mesopotamia but compose all the areas principally populated by the Turkish race. Our demands remain the same after our recent victory as they were before. We ask for Asia Minor, Thrace up to the river Maritza and Constantinople...We must have our capital and I should in that case be obliged to march on Constantinople with my army, which will be an affair of only a few days. I must prefer to obtain possession by negotiation though, naturally I cannot wait indefinitely."

The flashpoint was the Chanak Crisis where Kemal demanded the British garrison leave Chanak, pushing Britain to the brink of war with Turkey. The British Prime Minister David Lloyd George, supported by the War Secretary Winston Churchill, were determined to go to war over the issue with Churchill sending out telegrams asking for Canada, Australia and New Zealand to all send troops for the expected war. Ward Price's reporting paid tribute to the bravery of the British garrison at Chanak, but were also favourable to the Turks. Ward Price reported that Kemal did not have wider ambitions to restore the lost frontiers of the Ottoman Empire and only wanted the Allies to leave his homeland. Sir Horace Rumbold, the British Chief Commissioner for the occupied zone in Turkey wrote to London that Ward Price's pro-Turkish articles were "beneath contempt".

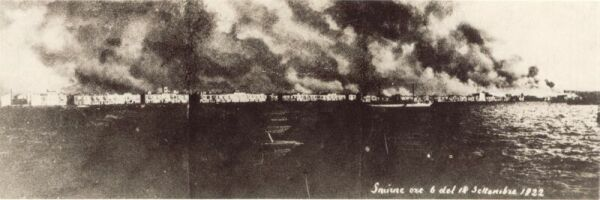
Panoramic view of the burning of Smyrna. In 1922, Ward Price covered the sack of Smyrna for the Daily Mail.

Ward Price's reporting affected the editorial policy of the Daily Mail which ran a banner headline on 21 September 1922 reading "Get Out Of Chanak!" In a leader (editorial), the Daily Mail wrote that Churchill's bellicose viewpoint towards the Turks was "bordering on insanity". The same leader noted that the Canadian Prime Minister William Lyon Mackenzie King had refused the British request for troops, leading for the Daily Mail to argue that Churchill's efforts to call upon the Dominions for help was endangering the unity of the British empire. Lloyd George was the leader of a Liberal–Conservative coalition, and the opposition of the Daily Mail, which normally supported the Conservatives, caused many Tories to reconsider continuing the coalition. The Chanak crisis ended with the Conservatives pulling out of the coalition, causing Lloyd George's downfall and with Britain backing down as the British agreed to pull their troops out of Turkey.

He attended further conferences in Cannes, Genoa and Lausanne. During a stall in the peace conference in Lausanne in February 1923, Ward Price travelled with İsmet İnönü – who had headed the Turkish delegation – from Lausanne back to Ankara, the new capital of Turkey. Ward Price complained that the train that İnönü took had "broken windows, no heating and no electric light", making for an uncomfortable train ride through the mountains of Anatolia in winter. Upon İnönü's arrival in Eskişehir on 18 February 1923 to meet President Kemal, Ward Price wrote: "The Ghazi [Kemal] – a Turkish military title conferred on 'Conquerors of the Infidel' – was dressed in a tweed suit, breeches, and cycling stockings, which contrasted oddly with his patent leather shoes". The picture of Kemal as presented by Ward Price was that of a soldier turned politician who, now that he was president of Turkey, was turning his attention to peaceful pursuits as reflected in his change of wardrobe from his uniform to civilian clothes. About Kemal's wife, Lâtife, Ward Price wrote she was unveiled while wearing "riding breeches with high boots and spurs". Ward Price wrote "Turkish onlookers were startled by this costume which no other women in Turkey would had dared to adopt".

In March 1923, Ward Price published an article about an interview with Kemal where he noted that his wife had much influence with him. Ward Price wrote about Lâtife Kemal that: "Her face had a wilful expression and she was obviously well aware of the importance of her position. 'If I tell you anything you may consider it just as authoritative as you heard it from the Ghazi himself' she said, rather condescendingly." After talking in the tea room at length with Lâtife Kemal, Ward Price finally met Kemal who refused to speak French as in the previous interviews and instead spoke in Turkish with his wife (who was fluent in English) translating. Ward Price wrote that the general guise of the interview was that: "Wives and daughters of the peasantry had always freely mixed with their menfolk, said Mustafa Kemal. The harem and the veil were snobbish innovations copied from the Arabs". The main issue at the peace conference in Lausanne was the Turkish demand for the Mosul region in Iraq, which the British refused to cede on the grounds that the peoples living there were Kurds and Arabs, not Turks. The Treaty of Lausanne when finally signed in July 1923 largely reflected the military realities with the Allies pulling out of Anatolia while the British continued to occupy the Mosul region with the understanding that the League of Nations would arbitrate about the dispute. In 1926, the League of Nations ruled in favour of Britain. Other than the Mosul issue, the Treaty of Lausanne was highly favourable to Turkish interests and Ward Price reported the mood in Turkey was joyous.

In April 1924, Ward Price scored a scoop when he visited Morocco to interview Abd el-Krim, the president of the Riffian Republic who had united the Berber tribes of the Rif mountains to successfully resist the Spanish in the Rif War. In 1921, Krim became internationally famous when his Berber tribesmen destroyed a Spanish army in the Battle of Annual, which astonished public opinion in Europe. Ward Price was the first Western journalist allowed to interview Krim. Much to his own surprise, Ward Price reported that the Berbers of the Rif were friendly and hospitable with the only unfriendly incident occurring when a group of armed tribesmen stopped his automobile to ask who he was. Krim had permitted the interview out of the belief that Ward Price had influence with the British government. Krim asked for Ward Price to take a letter to the British Prime Minister Ramsay MacDonald asking for Britain to mediate the Rif war with the understanding that Spain would recognize the Rif republic and cease trying to subject the Rif. Krim did not understand that MacDonald belonged to the Labour Party while the Daily Mail supported the Conservatives, limiting any influence that Ward Price might have with MacDonald. More importantly, MacDonald was unwilling to strain Anglo-Spanish relations for the sake of the people of the Rif.

From 1919 to 1928, the Prince of Wales (who would become the future King Edward VIII) undertook several tours throughout the British Empire. In 1925, he toured through the dominion of South Africa, and in the same year the prince undertook tours of Britain's colonies in West Africa. These tours, which British historian John MacKenzie describes as being "endlessly featured in the press and in newsreels", were always followed by the publication of a book describing the contents of the tour. For the Prince of Wales' South and West African tours, Ward Price was chosen to write the post-tour books. These publications, which were the second and third published by Ward Price, were titled With the Prince In West Africa (1925) and Through South Africa With The Prince (1926). The prefaces of the two publications, as with all post-tour books about the prince's travels, "contained prefaces by the prince extolling the wonders of the empire and the ways in which the public, not least boys and girls, should be aware of its importance and unity." MacKenzie considers both publications (along with all other post-tour books, including those written about the prince's brother) an indication of the "continuation of the traditions of late Victorian and Edwardian times." To add colour to the books, there were many photographs of the Prince of Wales meeting African peoples in their traditional costumes. MacKenzie noted that Ward Price presented the Prince of Wales as having a loving attitude towards his future subjects, but that in fact the prince had views "...so racist as to be barely printable".

A 1928 advertisement for a share offering in Northcliffe Newspapers Limited lists Price as a Company Director. He is also listed as Director of the Associated Newspapers Ltd arm of the company. In October 1932, Sir Oswald Mosley converted his New Party into the British Union of Fascists (BUF) following a visit to Rome. Much of the British press treated Mosley's movement as something of a joke, regarding his uniformed followers as absurd. Ward Price in his articles reporting on the BUF in the Daily Mail was one of the few British journalists to take the BUF seriously, writing that fascism was "a worldwide modern creed" that offered the solution to the problems of the modern world and gave a favourable review of Mosley's book The Greater Britain. In 1933, he followed the French Foreign Legion in Morocco. In 1937, he published his second book, In Morocco with the Legion, a romantic account of the French Foreign Legion.

== 'Enthusiast' for fascism ==
The 1930s saw Price carry out several interviews with Adolf Hitler and Benito Mussolini. The British historian Daniel Stone called Ward Price's reporting from Berlin and Rome "a mixture of snobbery, name dropping and obsequious pro-fascism of a most genteel 'English' type". In his articles, Ward Price consistently sought to belittle those who criticised the fascist regimes for human rights abuses, downplaying such reports and attacking the motives of the critics as self-interested and biased. In several of his articles, he argued that Jews and Ethiopians who criticised the Third Reich and the Third Italian Civilisation were only doing so to "play the victim" by garnering sympathy that they did not deserve. Stone described Ward Price as a crypto-fascist who professed to be an objective journalist who was taking a "just the facts" approach in his reporting, but in fact clearly admired and liked fascist regimes. Ward Price was very close to Lord Rothermere, the proprietor of the Daily Mail. The journalist Wickham Steed called Ward Price "the lackey of Mussolini, Hitler and Rothermere".

The British historian Richard Griffiths made a distinction between "enthusiasts" for fascism, which were a group of mostly upper class British people who favoured closer ties with Nazi Germany and usually (but not always) also favoured having Britain adopt fascism vs. the "appeasers" who were government officials who favoured concessions to the Third Reich for a variety of economic and strategical reasons. Griffiths noted it was possible to be both an "enthusiast" and an "appeaser", but that the two groups were not one and the same, and it was unhelpful to lump the two groups together as one. Griffiths classified Ward Price as an "enthusiast" for Nazi Germany as his work as the "extra special correspondent" for the Daily Mail more reflected the views of Lord Rothermere than the National Government. Ward Price had a unique status as one of the very few British journalists allowed to interview Hitler, and a result his interviews which were published in The Daily Mail were widely read in Britain.

In January 1934, Lord Rothermere ended the Daily Mail's support of the Conservative Party and instead endorsed the British Union of Fascists (BUF) led by Sir Oswald Mosley. In common with other Daily Mail journalists, Ward Price wrote favourably of the BUF and he joined the January Club, an upper class group of BUF supporters. After the violence during a BUF rally at Olympia Stadium on 8 June 1934 when a group of hecklers from the British Communist Party were violently ejected by the Blackshirts, Ward Price wrote in the Daily Mail: "If the Blackshirts movement had any need of justification, the Red Hooligans who savagely and systematically tried to wreck Sir Oswald Mosley's huge and magnificently successful meeting at Olympia last night would have supplied it. They got what they deserved. Olympia has been the scene of many assemblies and many great fights, but never had it offered the spectacle of so many fights mixed up with a meeting."

On 19 December 1934 during a visit to Berlin, Lord Rothermere, his son Esmond, Ward Price and the merchant banker Sir Ernest Tennant all had dinner with Hitler at the Reich Chancellery. Ward Price was close to two of the Mitford sisters, Diana and Unity. In the Daily Mail, Ward Price praised the beauty of the two sisters, writing "For Herr Hitler, the society of these two young Englishwomen has an attraction which can be readily imagined". About Unity Mitford, he wrote approvingly: "No one could sit long in a room as Miss Unity Mitford without noticing her. She had golden hair, fair skin, and blue eyes that attain the highest standard of that Nordic beauty which the Germans especially admire". Typical of Ward Price's reporting was a 1937 article, where he wrote:: "The sense of national unity—the Volkgemeinschaft—to which the Führer constantly appeals in his speeches is not a rhetorical invention, but a reality".

In January 1935, the German cruiser Emden visited Cape Town, where the South African Defence Minister Oswald Pirow – who was easily the most pro-Nazi member of the South African cabinet – gave a speech to the crew of the Emden calling for Germany to once again be a colonial power in Africa to help South Africa resist the "rising tide of the colored races". Pirow's speech attracted little attention in either South Africa or abroad until Ward Price brought it up in an interview with Hitler. Hitler's response was to state: "Until it has been confirmed I should not like to pass any opinion. I will only say that if South Africa or any other government would offer to give us back any of our colonies we would accept them willingly". The interview caused a great deal of alarm in the Foreign Office, which believed that Pirow was offering to return Southwest Africa (modern Namibia) to Germany and that Hitler was "testing the weaker vessel first" as part of his wider campaign to force the British, French and Belgian governments to return all of the former German African colonies to the Reich.

On 7 March 1936, Germany remilitarised the Rhineland, violating both the Treaty of Versailles and the Treaty of Locarno, both of which stated the Rhineland was to be demilitarised permanently. Unlike the Treaty of Versailles, Germany had signed the Treaty of Locarno voluntarily while both Italy and Britain had "guaranteed" that the Rhineland was to stay demilitarised. On 9 March 1936 in a bid to influence British public opinion, Hitler had an exclusive interview with Ward Price, where he gave his reasons for remilitarising the Rhineland. In his interview, Hitler stated that it was "unfair" that a part of Germany should be demilitarised, but stated that he was willing to accept this status as part of the price of peace and because it was mandated by the Treaty of Locarno. Hitler claimed to Ward Price that it was the ratification of the Franco-Soviet pact that had "forced" him to remilitarise the Rhineland. Hitler ended the interview by giving what the American historian Gerhard Weinberg called vague "sweet assurances" that the remilitarisation did not mean war and he was still willing to work for the peace of Europe.

On 5 May 1936, Ward Price interviewed Mussolini in Rome, and the interview was published in the Daily Mail on 7 May 1936. The main theme of the interview concerned the Italo-Ethiopian war, and Mussolini vehemently denied that Italians had used poison gas against the defenceless peoples of Ethiopia together with denying that the Regia Aeronautica had bombed Ethiopian hospitals and strafed Red Cross ambulances. Ward Price was sufficiently friendly towards Mussolini, asking only "soft" questions, that the interview was translated into Italian and published on 8 May 1936 in Il Popolo d'Italia, the official newspaper of the Grand Fascist Party.

In 1937, Ward Price published the book I Know These Dictators, where he portrayed himself as a close friend of Mussolini and Hitler. He wrote about Hitler: "Behind the forceful character he displays in public, he had a human, pleasant personality...He had the artistic, visionary tendencies of the South German type...and there was a strong strain of sadness and tenderness in his disposition...Hitler had a fondness for children and dogs...His personality and prestige were so strong that without any effort on his part, he is surrounded by much awe on the part of his entourage...Hitler is a widely read man...familiar with the works of the leading German philosophers who had mastered the history, geography and social and economic conditions of the chief European countries.". Ward Price boasted that he was "Hitler's friend" in his book, and proudly stated that he was regarded by Hitler as "the only foreign journalist who reported on him without prejudice".

In his book Ward Price wrote: "To law-abiding citizens the Nazi Government brought public order, political peace, better living-conditions, and the promise, some fulfilled, to make Germany once more a great nation...Upon the people who opposed, or looked like opposing, its plans, it laid a heavy hand... The rulers of Germany were stern because they believed the fate of their country was at stake. If they failed, the gates would be open wide to Bolshevism – the same bloodthirsty Bolshevism which had ravaged and liquidated in Russia, tortured and massacred in Hungary...The tolerant attitude of the average Anglo-Saxon towards Jews, Communists, and those deluded intellectuals indulgently termed 'parlour-Bolshevists' appears in Nazi eyes as stupid apathy in the presence of real danger".

Along the same lines Ward Price defended the Nazi concentration camps, writing in his book that the "German nation conceived of itself as in a state of siege" in 1933, which justified the "vigorous" use of concentration camps against a "ruthless and treacherous enemy". Ward Price wrote: "Great capital has been made by enemies of Germany out of the concentration camps, just as it was made by enemies of Britain out of alleged abuses in the concentration camps of the Boer War. In both cases gross and reckless exaggerations were made. That there would have been far more cruelty in Germany had the Communists been the guardians instead of the inmates of the concentration camps is proved by the horrors that went on wherever the Bolsheviks have gained the upper hand".

During Anschluss, the German annexation of Austria, Price accompanied Hitler's party as they entered Vienna. Of his interviews with Hitler, journalist John Simpson noted:

George Ward Price and Tom Sefton Delmer didn't interview Hitler in the sense that a modern journalist is expected to interview a political leader, putting alternative points of view and bringing up instances where the facts run counter to political rhetoric. Instead, they simply steered him towards a particular subject, then recorded his answers. Getting in to speak to the great man in the first place was the hard part: the actual business of interviewing him was relatively easy.

— John Simpson, We Chose to Speak of War and Strife: The World of the Foreign Correspondent

In newsreel footage of the scenes in Vienna, Price can be seen near Hitler on the balcony of the Hofburg Palace.

With the Munich Crisis, he covered the visit of Neville Chamberlain to Berchtesgaden and witnessed the entry of German troops in the Sudetenland.

Reporting on the concentration camps Price wrote:

To blacken the whole Nazi régime because a few subordinates may have abused their powers is as unfair as it would be to condemn the Government of the United States for the brutalities of some warder in charge of a chain-gang in the mountains of West Virginia.

== The Danzig crisis ==
On 15 March 1939, Germany violated the Munich Agreement by occupying the Czech half of Czecho-Slovakia as Czechoslovakia had been renamed in October 1938. Ward Price was dismayed by this action, writing that Hitler had lost much sympathy in Britain by a move that he deemed dangerous and reckless. Ward Price whose articles during the Sudetenland crisis had been very pro-German took a slightly more critical approach during the Danzig crisis of 1939. In an article, Ward Price wrote that after 15 March 1939, the "possibility of cordial relations" between Germany and Britain had "now passed away". During the Danzig crisis, Ward Price expressed his support for a peaceful solution of the crisis, writing that he wanted a Munich-type deal that would have seen Britain pressure Poland into allowing the Free City of Danzig (modern Gdańsk) to rejoin Germany.

However, though he warned in his articles in the spring and summer of 1939 that Germany should not attack Poland, he cast Poland as the principal problem, arguing that the Danzig crisis would end peacefully the moment the Free City went "home to the Reich" as Hitler kept demanding. Griffiths summarised the thesis of Ward Price and the other 'enthusiasts' as beginning "...with a ritual objection to Germany's aggressive stance, which was causing the danger to Europe. The tendency was, now, to accept this as aggression, but to call for concessions which would assure Germany that she did not need to adopt such a stance; above all, the cry was now that we should not go to war to support the cause of those who were of no real interest to us, particularly the Jews. If we destroyed Nazism, something far worse was likely to emerge. Hitler remained the bulwark against Communism". For Ward Price's friend, Admiral Barry Domvile, even this was too much, and Domvile in an article in July 1939 blasted Ward Price for having "gone yellow".

Griffiths noted that one of the peculiarities of the Danzig crisis that pushed Germany and Britain to the brink of war was that the spring and summer of 1939 actually saw a surge in support for fascist groups in Britain, which Griffiths attributed to a desire to find a way to save the peace. Griffiths noted that the Right Club, an anti-Semitic group headed by the Conservative MP Archibald Maule Ramsay was founded in May 1939 after the Danzig crisis had begun. In the summer of 1939 Ward Price attended a dinner hosted by Sir Oswald and Diana Mosley whose other attendees included the Conservative MPs Jocelyn Lucas, John Moore-Brabazon and Archibald Maule Ramsay; the scientist Arthur Pillans Laurie; Philip Farrar, the private secretary to Lord Salisbury; Admiral Barry Domvile, the leader of a pro-Nazi group, The Link; the journalist A. K. Chesterton; and the historian J. F. C. Fuller. The main theme of the dinner was trying to find a way to stop the Danzig crisis from escalating into war, with those present at the dinner feeling it was the British Jewish community who were the ones pushing for a war. Admiral Domvile's group, The Link, which as its name suggests was intended to be a link to the NSDAP, was the far-right group most suspect to British officials. Domvile's phone was tapped by MI5, and MI5 records show that despite his article in July that Domvile was in regular phone contact with Ward Price in August 1939 about The Link.

== Second World War ==
Price returned to his work as a war correspondent at the start of the Second World War, working for three months at Arras. However, with the conditions of the time there was little to report, so Price toured 1938 through south-east Europe. He visited Turkey, Romania, Yugoslavia and Italy. During the Phoney War, Ward Price in his articles constantly accused refugees from Germany and Austria of being spies and fifth columnists as he demanded that the British government "intern the lot". In an article in the Daily Mail in October 1939, Ward Price first raised the issue of the refugees as being potentially spies. In the same article he claimed that he "disliked the Nazi persecution of that race [Jews]", but went on to blame anti-Semitism in Germany on the Jews themselves, saying that German Jews had "asked for much of what they had got". Ward Price ended his article with the statement it was up to German Jewish and Austrian Jewish refugees in Britain "not to arouse" prejudice against themselves. Although Ward Price's anti-refugee articles were framed as ostensibly anti-Nazi, there was a strong undercurrent of anti-Semitism to his articles as he hinted darkly that Jewish refugees were a people supposedly lacking in morality and scruples. The subtext of his articles was that Jewish refugees were allegedly so amoral that they would work as spies for Nazi Germany. In July 1940, as Britain was facing a German invasion expected anytime that summer, a moral panic in part stocked by Ward Price's articles led for the British government to intern all Germans, Austrians and Italians living in the United Kingdom with the internees being sent to internment camps in Australia and Canada.

He did not return to the war until 1942, when he covered the fighting in North Africa. In 1942–43, there was a power struggle in Algiers between General Henri Giraud and General Charles de Gaulle for the leadership of the Free French movement, and with it Algeria (considered to be a part of France at the time). The British historian Julian Jackson stated in an interview: "Once Vichyite Algeria had been conquered by the Allies, de Gaulle was finally allowed to go there, in May 1943. Now Algiers replaced London and Brazzaville as the capital of the Free French. Even more important was the fact that Algeria contained an important reservoir of North African troops. At the end of 1942 de Gaulle's total forces never numbered more than 50,000, but now, in 1943, thanks to Algeria, he had an army of about half a million men. This multi-racial army was first thrown into battle in Italy in 1943 - it fought at the Battle of Monte Cassino - then landed with Americans in southern France in August 1944...The French were quick to forget that it was thanks to their colonial soldiers that they had any claim to have re-entered the war in 1944 as a great power." Ward Price backed Giraud and in 1944 published the book Giraud and the African Scene arguing the case for Giraud. In a review of Giraud and the African Scene, the American journalist Robert Gale Woolbert wrote: "This would appear to be an authorized defense of the general's career, with emphasis on his role in North Africa. Mr. Price, formerly a confessed appeaser, still evinces a preference for Pétain and treats his subject most sympathetically."

== Post-war period ==
On 28 February 1949 Ward Price had an interview in Tokyo with General Douglas MacArthur who was in charge of the American occupation of Japan, which was published on 1 March 1949 in the Daily Mail. MacArthur had a reputation as an Anglophobe, but in the interview, MacArthur insisted that he was really an Anglophile, saying he was very proud of his Scots heritage as his paternal grandfather had immigrated from Scotland to the United States. In the same interview, MacArthur spoke of the Cold War in Asia, saying: "Our line of defense starts in the Philippines and continues through the Ryukyu archipelago, which includes its main bastion, Okinawa, and then backs through Japan and the Aleutian island chain to Alaska". Notably, MacArthur excluded South Korea from the "line of defense". MacArthur told Ward Price that he envisioned Japan as neutral in the Cold War, but stated that the United States would to go to war to defend Japan from the Soviet Union. However, MacArthur went on to say: "Even if the Soviet government had aggressive intentions towards her [Japan], it would be incapable of carrying them out, unless it could secure mastery of the air and either had a Far Eastern fleet of its own or possessed the means of neutralising any action by our own fleet".

Believing it might be the beginning of a Third World War, Price travelled to the Korean War in 1950 after learning of the outbreak while in Canada. Ward Price had a marked tendency towards hero worship, always seeking some "great man" for him to glorify. In the Korean War, he found his hero in General MacArthur, a megalomaniac U.S. Army general of extreme right-wing views, whom he gloried as a great military genius, and as result was allowed to interview MacArthur on a regular basis.

In 1957, he published his memoir Extra-Special Correspondent, which has been widely criticised for its dishonesty as he retroactively sought to portray himself as an anti-fascist. In Extra-Special Correspondent, Ward Price wrote: "The many meetings that I had with Hitler...always filled me with astonishment that a man of his neurotic character and limited perceptions should be able to maintain personal domination over a race possessing such varied and conspicuous qualities as the Germans...I was surprised to see the deference displayed towards him by so many Germans who were his superiors in education, intellect and experience." Griffiths noted that in his 1937 book I Know These Dictators, Ward Price took a fawning tone towards both Fascist Italy and Nazi Germany, portraying himself as a close friend of both Mussolini and Hitler, which was very difficult to reconcile with the self-portrayal of himself as a determined opponent of fascism that he made in Extra-Special Correspondent.

Price died on 22 August 1961 at the age of 75.

== Images ==
George Ward Price and Henry Nevinson at Gallipoli – Imperial War Museum

George Ward Price in Germany, 1938 – National Portrait Gallery

== Books and articles ==
- Çalislar, Ipek (2013). Madam Atatürk The First Lady of Modern Turkey. London: Saqi. ISBN 9780863568473.
- Crozier, Andrew (1988). Appeasement And Germany's Last Bid For Colonies. Oxford: Springer. ISBN 1349192554.
- Dack, Janet (2010). "'It certainly wasn't cricket!': Media responses to Mosely and the BUF". In Nigel Copsey, A. J. Olechnowicz (ed.). Varieties of Anti-Fascism Britain in the Inter-War Period. London: Macmillan. pp. 140–161. ISBN 9780230282674.
- Forgacs, David (2014). Italy's Margins Social Exclusion and Nation Formation Since 1861. Cambridge: Cambridge University Press. ISBN 9781107052178.
- Furneaux, Rupert (1967). Abdel Krim: Emir of the Rif. London: Secker & Warburg.
- Gerwarth, Robert (2016). The Vanquished Why the First World War Failed to End. New York: Farrar, Straus and Giroux. ISBN 9780374710682.
- Griffiths, Richard (1980). Fellow Travellers of the Right: British Enthusiasts for Nazi Germany, 1933-1939. London: Faber and Faber. ISBN 0571271324.
- Griffiths, Richard (1998). Patriotism Perverted Captain Ramsay, the Right Club, and British Anti-Semitism, 1939-1940. London: Faber & Faber. ISBN 9780571310456.
- Lowe, Peter (1997). The Origins of the Korean War. London: Taylor & Francis. ISBN 9781317890935.
- Mango, Andrew (2002). Ataturk. New York: Harry N. Abrams. ISBN 9781585673346.
- Mango, Andrew (2009). From the Sultan to Atatürk Turkey. London: Haus Publishing. ISBN 9781907822063.
- MacKenzie, John (2016). "The First World War and the cultural, political and environmental transformation of the British empire". In Andrekos Varnava, Michael J. K. Walsh (ed.). The Great War and the British Empire Culture and Society. London: Taylor & Francis. pp. 23–38. ISBN 9781317029830.
- Pugh, Martin (2013). Hurrah For The Blackshirts! Fascists and Fascism in Britain Between the Wars. New York: Random House. ISBN 9781448162871.
- Robin, Antony; Kushner, Jeremy (1989). Traditions of Intolerance Historical Perspectives on Fascism and Race Discourse in Britain. Manchester: Manchester University Press. ISBN 9780719028984.
- Stone, Daniel (2003). Responses to Nazism in Britain, 1933-1939 Before War and Holocaust. London: Palgrave Macmillan. ISBN 9780230505537.
- Stone, Daniel (2019). Concentration Camps: A Very Short Introduction. Oxford: Oxford University Press. ISBN 9780191035029.
- Wainstock, Denis (1959). Truman, MacArthur, and the Korean War. Westport: Greenwood Press. ISBN 9780313308376.
- Weinberg, Gerhard (1970). The Foreign Policy of Hitler's Germany Diplomatic Revolution in Europe 1933–36. Chicago: University of Chicago Press.
- Woolman, David (1968). Rebels in the Rif Abd El Krim and the Rif Rebellion. Redwood City: Stanford University Press. ISBN 9780196903767.
- Evans, Richard (2025). Interviewing Hitler: How George Ward Price Became the World's Most Famous Journalist. United Kingdom: The History Press. ISBN 9781803999135.
