= Oscar Pulvermacher =

British journalist

Oscar Pulvermacher (1882–1958) was an editor-in-chief and member of the board of directors for The Daily Mail, a popular English tabloid.

== Family ==
Oscar Pulvermacher was born in London. His parents were Isaac Pulvermacher and Augusta Pulvermacher (née Fiedler).

== Career ==
Oscar was born into comparative wealth, but on the death of his father, everything changed. His mother Augusta remarried, and her late husband's fortune passed to her second husband. Oscar, then just shy of 14 years old, was forced to leave school and earn his keep. He worked first as a delivery boy, and then found a small job as a messenger boy for the Daily Mail. He ascended the ranks year after year, until he became editor (1929–1930) and earned himself a place on the board of directors. Pulvermacher left the Mail eventually to work for The Daily Telegraph. He left London with his wife Marie Barnett Pulvermacher and emigrated to Johannesburg, South Africa, where he died in 1958.

Media offices
Preceded by W. G. Fish	Editor of the Daily Mail; 1930	Succeeded by William McWhirter
