= Thomas Marlowe =

British newspaper editor

Thomas Marlowe (18 March 1868 – 5 December 1935) was a British newspaper editor.

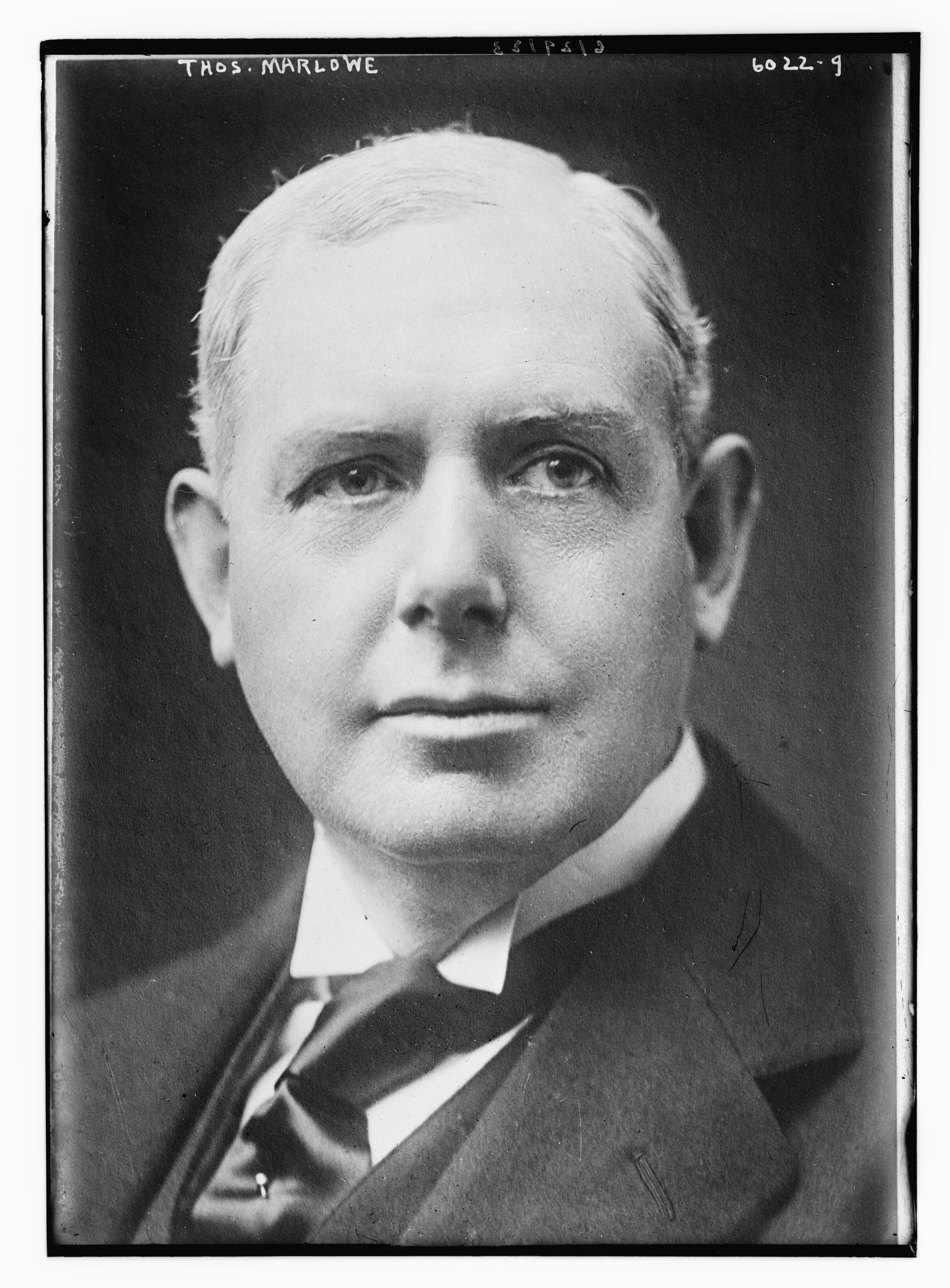

Born in Portsmouth, Marlowe studied medicine at Queen's College, Galway, and then at the London Hospital. Around this time, he was associated with the Social Democratic Federation. He left his studies, without graduating, when he was offered the chance to train as a journalist at The Star.

In 1896, the Daily Mail was founded, and Marlowe was appointed by Alfred Harmsworth as its News Editor and chief-of-staff, then in 1899, he was appointed as the newspaper's editor. Marlowe occasionally came into conflict with Northcliffe, in particular at the start of World War I when Northcliffe opposed sending British troops overseas, but Marlowe persuaded him to change his mind.

Ahead of the 1924 UK general election, Marlowe published the Zinoviev letter, a fake document purporting to show Soviet interference in British politics. For the rest of his life, Marlowe claimed that the letter was genuine, and that if he had not published it, the Foreign Office would have kept it secret until after the election.

From 1918, Marlowe was additionally the chair of Associated Newspapers. He retired from all his posts in 1926, and died nine years later.

Media offices
Preceded by S. J. Pryor	Editor of the Daily Mail; 1899–1926	Succeeded by W. G. Fish
