= Harold Perrin =

British aviator (c.1878–1948)

Lieutenant-Commander Harold Perrin CBE
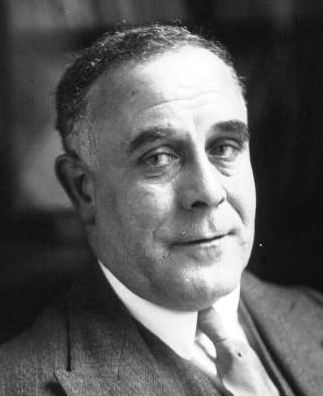
- Perrin in 1928

Secretary, Royal Aero Club
- In office 1903–1945

Personal details
- Born: Harold Ernest Perrin c. 1878
- Died: 9 April 1948 (aged 69–70)

Lieutenant-Commander Harold Ernest Perrin CBE (c.1878 – 9 April 1948) was a British aviation pioneer.

Perrin served as secretary of the Royal Aero Club from 1903 to 1945, and in this capacity signed more than 20,000 private pilots' licences. As secretary of the Aero Club, he dedicated himself to growing the society. His "bluff manner" was said to have offended those who did not know him, but "all respected his undoubted abilities".

In 1922, Perrin was a co-founder of the Aero Golfing Society. From 1922 to 1947, Perrin served as first Honorary Secretary to the Society.

Perrin was appointed Commander of the Order of the British Empire (CBE) in 1936.

On 9 April 1948 Perrin died suddenly at age 70.
