= Paul Grof =

Paul Grof is a Czech-born psychiatrist in Canada who was a member of the World Health Organization committee that evaluated ecstasy. Rick Doblin notes:

The person appointed chairman of WHO's Expert Committee was Dr. Paul Grof, brother of Stanislav Grof, the LSD researcher. [Through him] I was able to send information about MDMA to Paul Grof. Though the committee did make MDMA illegal, they did so over the objections of the chairman, with the objections being formally noted in the committee's recommendation. Even more importantly, the committee explicitly encouraged the signatory nations to the international drug control treaty to facilitate research into MDMA, which they called a most interesting substance.(Saunders, 1994, Appendix 1, note 94)

Following his graduation in medicine, Paul Grof took his psychiatric training and became specialized in psychiatry in 1962. He worked as a research psychiatrist in the Psychiatric Research Institute in Prague, and as a fellow in psychoendocrinology of affective disorders in West Germany. In the fall of 1968 Dr. Grof was recruited as research psychiatrist and faculty member at McMaster University, Canada. Between 1974 and 1977 he helped develop and run Affective disorder Clinics at the Sunnybrook Medical Center at the University of Toronto, and several other Canadian universities. Dr. Grof spent 1977 and 1978 as a visiting scientist at the National Institute of Mental Health in Washington, initially in a clinical neuropharmacology branch with Dennis Murphy and later in the psychobiology branch with Fred Goodwin. In 1982 Dr. Grof became Director of Research and Education at the Hamilton Psychiatric Hospital, a teaching hospital of McMaster University where he expanded research activities in psychobiology, and established a psychopharmacology research and training center. 1985–2000 he was active as Expert of the World Health Organization, Mental Health section and chaired both an Expert committee and a Working Group on psychotropic drugs. In 1988 Dr. Grof was recruited as Clinical Director of the Royal Ottawa Hospital. He was recently Professor of Psychiatry at the University of Ottawa, and remains so with the University of Toronto, and directs a Mood Disorders Center. He has published over 350 articles and two books, and received several national and international research awards.
