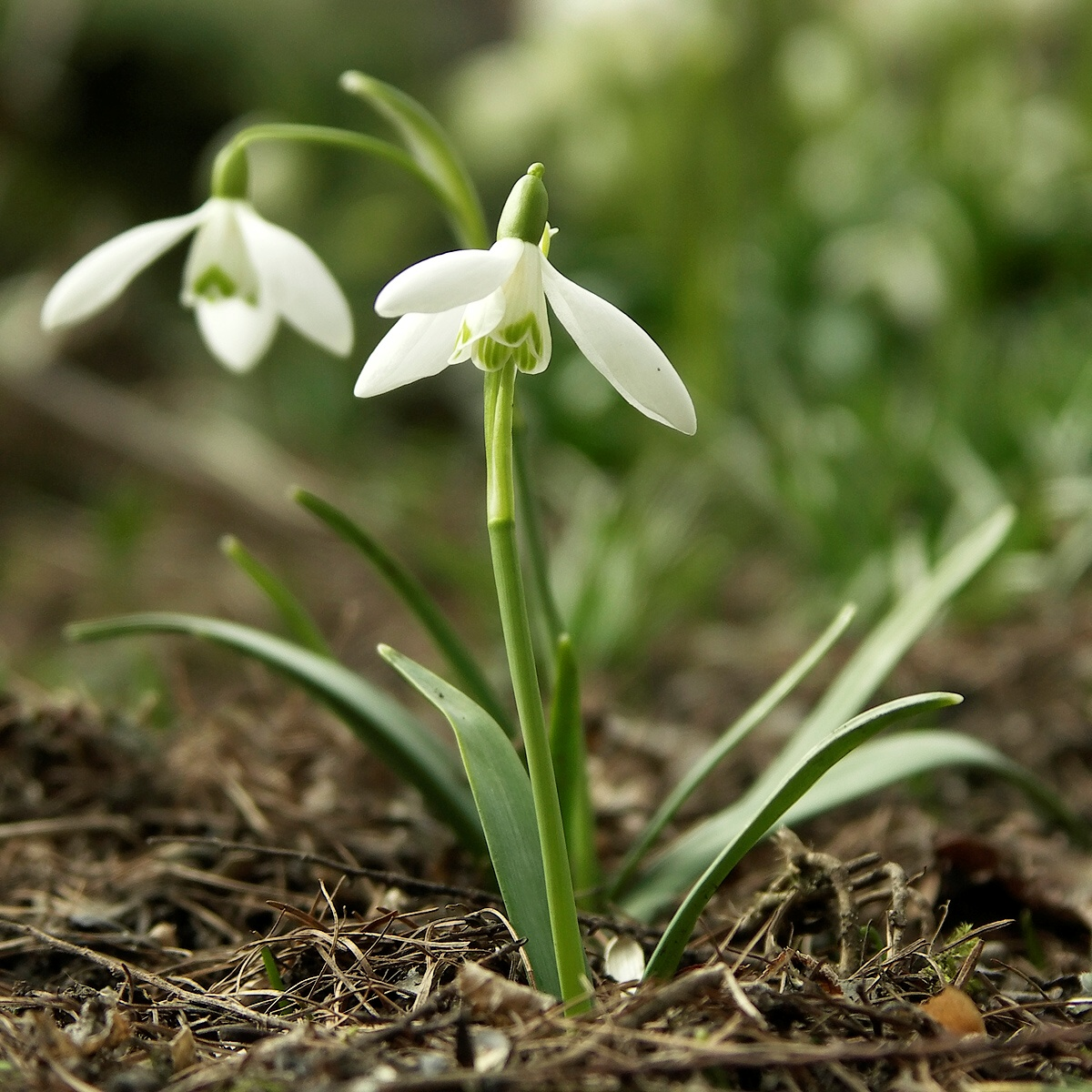
- Galanthus nivalis common snowdrop
- CITES Appendix II

Scientific classification
- Kingdom: Plantae
- Clade: Tracheophytes
- Clade: Angiosperms
- Clade: Monocots
- Order: Asparagales
- Family: Amaryllidaceae
- Subfamily: Amaryllidoideae
- Tribe: Galantheae
- Genus: Galanthus; L.

Type species
- Galanthus nivalis L.

Synonyms
- Erangelia Reneaulme ex L.; Acrocorion Adans.; Chianthemum Siegert ex Kuntze

= Galanthus =

Snowdrop

Genus of flowering plants

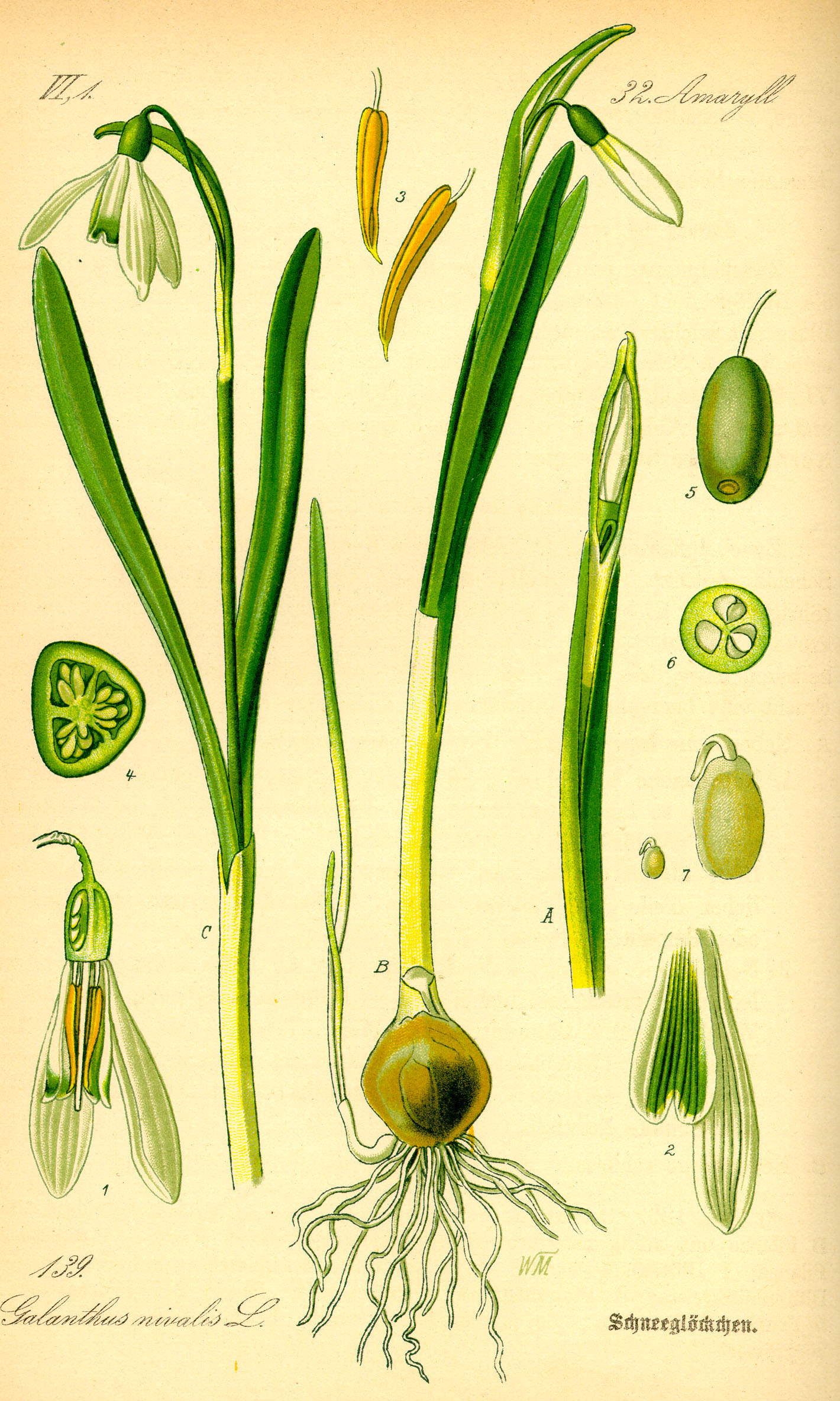
Galanthus nivalis: Flora von Deutschland, Österreich und der Schweiz, 1885

Galanthus (from Ancient Greek γάλα, (gála, "milk") + ἄνθος (ánthos, "flower")), or snowdrop, is a small genus of approximately 20 species of bulbous perennial herbaceous plants in the family Amaryllidaceae. The plants have two linear leaves and a single small white drooping bell-shaped flower with six petal-like (petaloid) tepals in two circles (whorls). The smaller inner petals have green markings.

Snowdrops have been known since the earliest times under various names, but were named Galanthus in 1753. As the number of recognised species increased, various attempts were made to divide the species into subgroups, usually on the basis of the pattern of the emerging leaves (vernation). In the era of molecular phylogenetics this characteristic has been shown to be unreliable and now seven molecularly defined clades are recognised that correspond to the biogeographical distribution of species. New species continue to be discovered.

Most species flower in winter, before the vernal equinox (20 or 21 March in the Northern Hemisphere), but some flower in early spring and late autumn. Sometimes snowdrops are confused with the two related genera within the tribe Galantheae, snowflakes Leucojum and Acis.

== Description ==
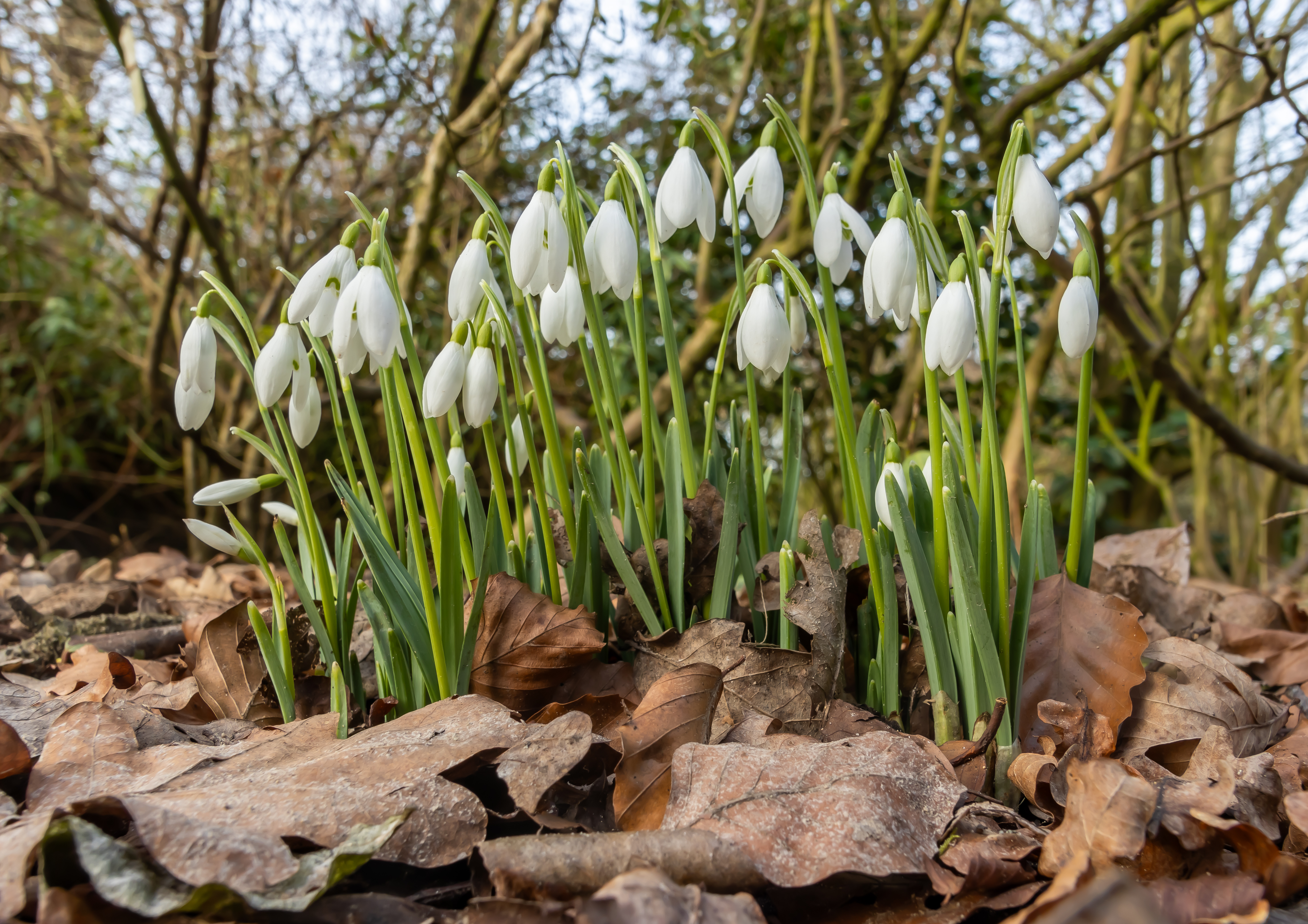
Snowdrops growing through autumn leaves

=== General ===
All species of Galanthus are perennial petaloid herbaceous bulbous (growing from bulbs) monocot plants. The genus is characterised by the presence of two leaves, pendulous white flowers with six free perianth segments in two whorls. The inner whorl is smaller than the outer whorl and has green markings.

=== Vegetative ===
Leaves

These are basal, emerging from the bulb initially enclosed in a tubular membranous sheath of cataphylls. Generally, these are two (sometimes three) in number and linear, strap-shaped, or oblanceolate. Vernation, the arrangement of the emerging leaves relative to each other, varies among species. These may be applanate (flat), supervolute (conduplicate), or explicative (pleated). In applanate vernation, the two leaf blades are pressed flat to each other within the bud and as they emerge; explicative leaves are also pressed flat against each other, but the edges of the leaves are folded back (externally recurved) or sometimes rolled; in supervolute plants, one leaf is tightly clasped around the other within the bud and generally remains at the point where the leaves emerge from the soil (for illustration, see Stearn and Davis). In the past, this feature has been used to distinguish between species and to determine the parentage of hybrids, but now has been shown to be homoplasious, and not useful in this regard.

The scape (flowering stalk) is erect, leafless, terete, or compressed.

=== Reproductive ===
Inflorescence

At the top of the scape is a pair of bract-like spathes (valves) usually fused down one side and joined by a papery membrane, appearing monophyllous (single). From between the spathes emerges a solitary (rarely two), pendulous, nodding, bell-shaped white flower, held on a slender pedicel. The flower bears six free perianth segments (tepals) rather than true petals, arranged in two whorls of three, the outer whorl being larger and more convex than the inner whorl. The outer tepals are acute to more or less obtuse, spathulate or oblanceolate to narrowly obovate or linear, shortly clawed, and erect spreading. The inner tepals are much shorter (half to two thirds as long), oblong, spathulate or oblanceolate, somewhat unguiculate (claw like); tapering to the base and erect. These tepals also bear green markings at the base, the apex, or both, that when at the apex, are bridge-shaped over the small sinus (notch) at the tip of each tepal, which are emarginate. Occasionally, the markings are either green-yellow, yellow, or absent, and the shape and size varies by species.

Androecium

The six stamens are inserted at the base of the perianth, and are very short (shorter than the inner perianth segments), the anthers basifixed (attached at their bases) with filaments much shorter than the anthers; they dehisce (open) by terminal pores or short slits.

Gynoecium, fruit and seeds

The inferior ovary is three-celled. The style is slender and longer than the anthers; the stigma is minutely capitate. The ovary ripens into a three-celled capsule fruit. This fruit is fleshy, ellipsoid or almost spherical, opening by three flaps, with seeds that are light brown to white and oblong with a small appendage or tail (elaiosome) containing substances attractive to ants, which distribute the seeds.

The chromosome number is 2n=24.

Floral formula: $\star\; P_{3+3} \; A_{3+3} \; G_{\overline{(3)}}$

== Distribution and habitat ==
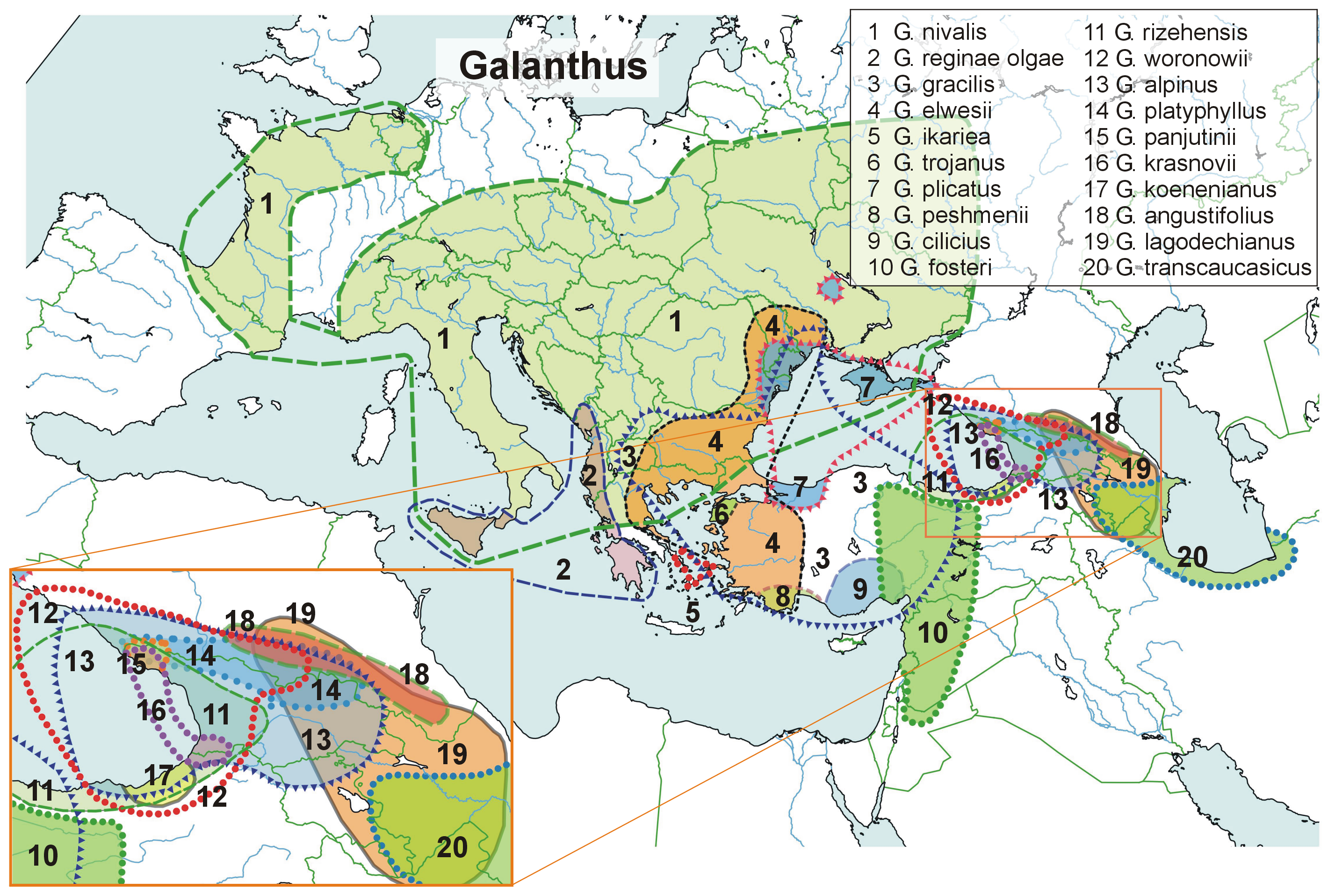
Distribution map of Galanthus species in Europe and Western Asia

The genus Galanthus is native to Europe and the Middle East, from the Spanish and French Pyrenees in the west through to the Caucasus and Iran in the east, and south to Sicily, the Peloponnese, the Aegean, Turkey, Lebanon, and Syria. The northern limit is uncertain because G. nivalis has been widely introduced and cultivated throughout Europe. G. nivalis and some other species valued as ornamentals have become widely naturalised in Europe, North America, and other regions. In the Udmurt republic of Russia, Galanthus are found even above the 56th parallel.

Galanthus nivalis is the best-known and most widespread representative of the genus Galanthus. It is native to a large area of Europe, stretching from the Pyrenees in the west, through France and Germany to Poland in the north, Italy, northern Greece, Bulgaria, Romania, Ukraine, and European Turkey. It has been introduced and is widely naturalised elsewhere. Although it is often thought of as a British native wild flower, or to have been brought to the British Isles by the Romans, it most likely was introduced around the early sixteenth century, and is currently not a protected species in the UK. It was first recorded as naturalised in the UK in Worcestershire and Gloucestershire in 1770. Most other Galanthus species are from the eastern Mediterranean, while several are found in the Caucasus, in southern Russia, Georgia, Armenia, and Azerbaijan. Galanthus fosteri is found in Jordan, Lebanon, Syria, Turkey, and, perhaps, Palestine.

Most Galanthus species grow best in woodland, in acid or alkaline soil, although some are grassland or mountain species.

== Taxonomy ==
=== History ===
==== Early ====
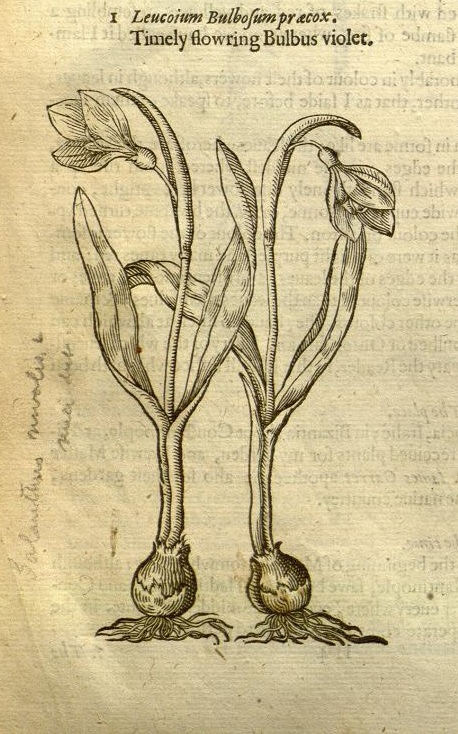
G. nivalis from John Gerard's Herball, 1597

Snowdrops have been known since early times, being described by the classical Greek author Theophrastus, in the fourth century BCE, in his Περὶ φυτῶν ἱστορία (Latin: Historia plantarum, Enquiry into plants). He gave it, and similar plants, the name λευκόἲον (λευκος, leukos "white" and ἰόν, ion "violet") from which the later name Leucojum was derived. He described the plant as "ἑπεἰ τοῖς γε χρώμασι λευκἂ καἱ οὐ λεπυριώδη" (in colour white and bulbs without scales) and of their habits "Ἰῶν δ' ἁνθῶν τὀ μἑν πρῶτον ἑκφαἱνεται τὁ λευκόἲον, ὅπου μἑν ό ἀἠρ μαλακώτερος εὐθὑς τοῦ χειμῶνος, ὅπου δἐ σκληρότερος ὕστερον, ἑνιαχοῡ τοῡ ἣρος" (Of the flowers, the first to appear is the white violet. Where the climate is mild, it appears with the first sign of winter, but in more severe climates, later in spring).

Rembert Dodoens, a Flemish botanist, described and illustrated this plant in 1583 as did Gerard in England in 1597 (probably using much of Dodoens' material), calling it Leucojum bulbosum praecox (Early bulbous violet). Gerard refers to Theophrastus's description as Viola alba or Viola bulbosa, using Pliny's translation, and comments that the plant had originated in Italy and had "taken possession" in England "many years past". The genus was formally named Galanthus and described by Carl Linnaeus in 1753, with the single species, Galanthus nivalis, which is the type species. Consequently, Linnaeus is granted the botanical authority. In doing so, he distinguished this genus and species from Leucojum (Leucojum bulbosum trifolium minus), a name by which it previously had been known.

==== Modern ====
In 1763 Michel Adanson began a system of arranging genera in families. Using the synonym Acrocorion (also spelt Akrokorion), he placed Galanthus in the family Liliaceae, section Narcissi. Lamarck provided a description of the genus in his encyclopedia (1786), and later, Illustrations des genres (1793). In 1789 de Jussieu, who is credited with the modern concept of genera organised in families, placed Galanthus and related genera within a division of Monocotyledons, using a modified form of Linnaeus' sexual classification, but with the respective topography of stamens to carpels rather than just their numbers. In doing so, he restored the name Galanthus and retained their placement under Narcissi, this time as a family (known as Ordo, at that time) and referred to the French vernacular name, Perce-neige (Snow-pierce), based on the plants tendency to push through early spring snow (see Ecology for illustration). The modern family of Amaryllidaceae, in which Galanthus is placed, dates to Jaume Saint-Hilaire (1805) who replaced Jussieu's Narcissi with Amaryllidées. In 1810, Brown proposed that a subgroup of Liliaceae be distinguished on the basis of the position of the ovaries and be referred to as Amaryllideae, and in 1813, de Candolle separated them by describing Liliacées Juss. and Amaryllidées Brown as two quite separate families. However, in his comprehensive survey of the Flora of France (Flore française, 1805–1815) he divided Liliaceae into a series of Ordres, and placed Galanthus into the Narcissi Ordre. This relationship of Galanthus to either liliaceous or amaryllidaceaous taxa (see Taxonomy of Liliaceae) was to last for another two centuries until the two were formally divided at the end of the twentieth century. Lindley (1830) followed this general pattern, placing Galanthus and related genera such as Amaryllis and Narcissus in his Amaryllideae (which he called The Narcissus Tribe in English). By 1853, the number of known plants was increasing considerably and he revised his schema in his last work, placing Galanthus together, and the other two genera in the modern Galantheae in tribe Amarylleae, order Amaryllidaceae, alliance Narcissales. These three genera have been treated together taxonomically by most authors, on the basis of an inferior ovary. As the number of plant species increased, so did the taxonomic complexity. By the time Bentham and Hooker published their Genera plantarum (1862–1883) ordo Amaryllideae contained five tribes, and tribe Amarylleae three subtribes (see Bentham & Hooker system). They placed Galanthus in subtribe Genuinae and included three species.

=== Phylogeny ===
Cladogram of evolutionary lines in Galanthus sensu Ronsted et al.

- Galantheae
  - Galanthus
  - - Acis
    - Leucojum

Galanthus is one of three closely related genera making up the tribe Galantheae within subfamily Amaryllidoideae (family Amaryllidaceae). Sometimes snowdrops are confused with the other two genera, Leucojum and Acis (both called snowflakes). Leucojum species are much larger and flower in spring (or early summer, depending on the species), with all six tepals in the flower being the same size, although some "poculiform" (goblet- or cup-shaped) Galanthus species may have inner segments similar in shape and length to the outer ones. Galantheae are likely to have arisen in the Caucusus.

=== Subdivision ===
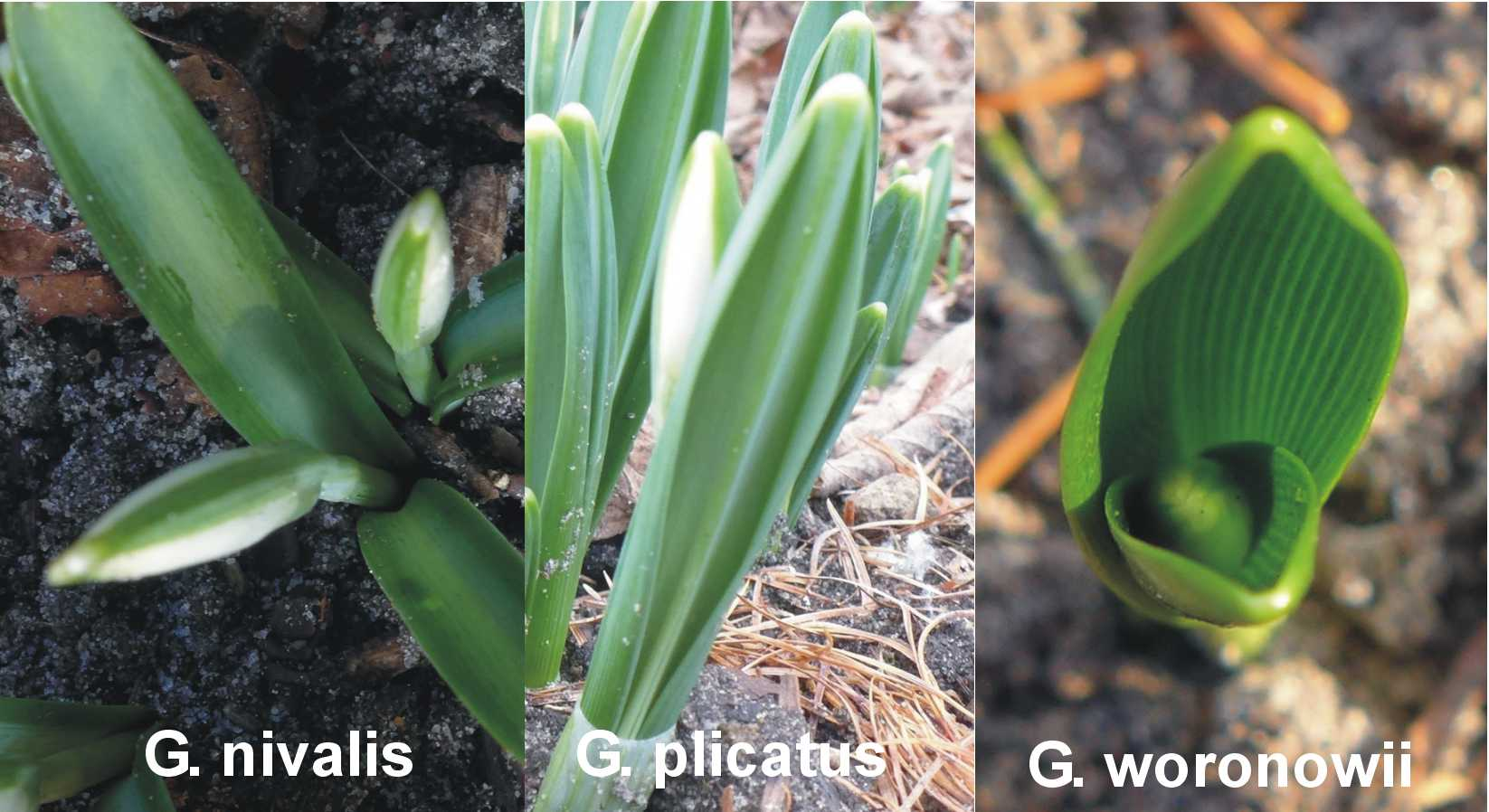
The three different forms of leaf shoots from the bulb: flat (applanate), folded (explicative) rolled up (convolute) (left to right)

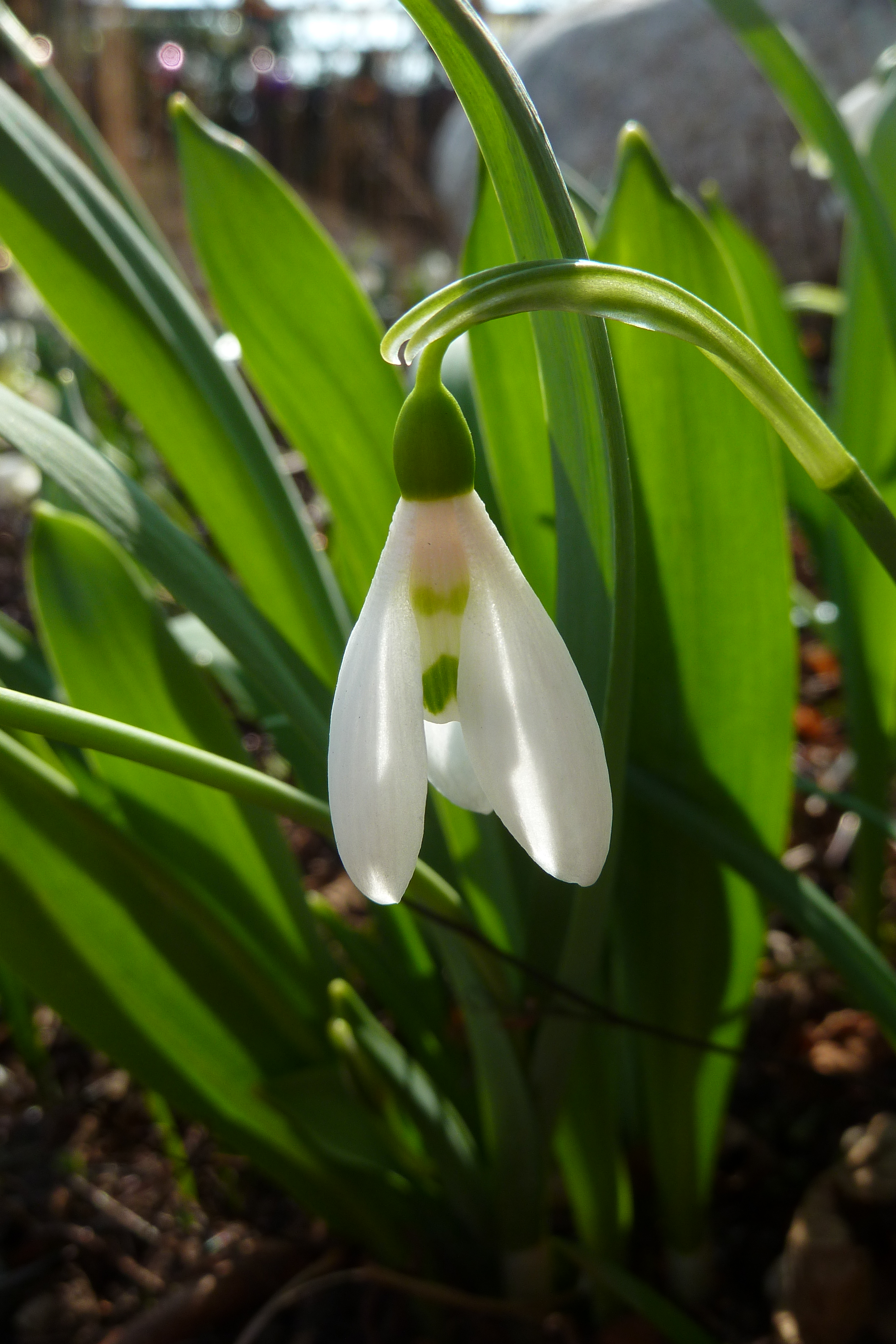
Galanthus elwesii

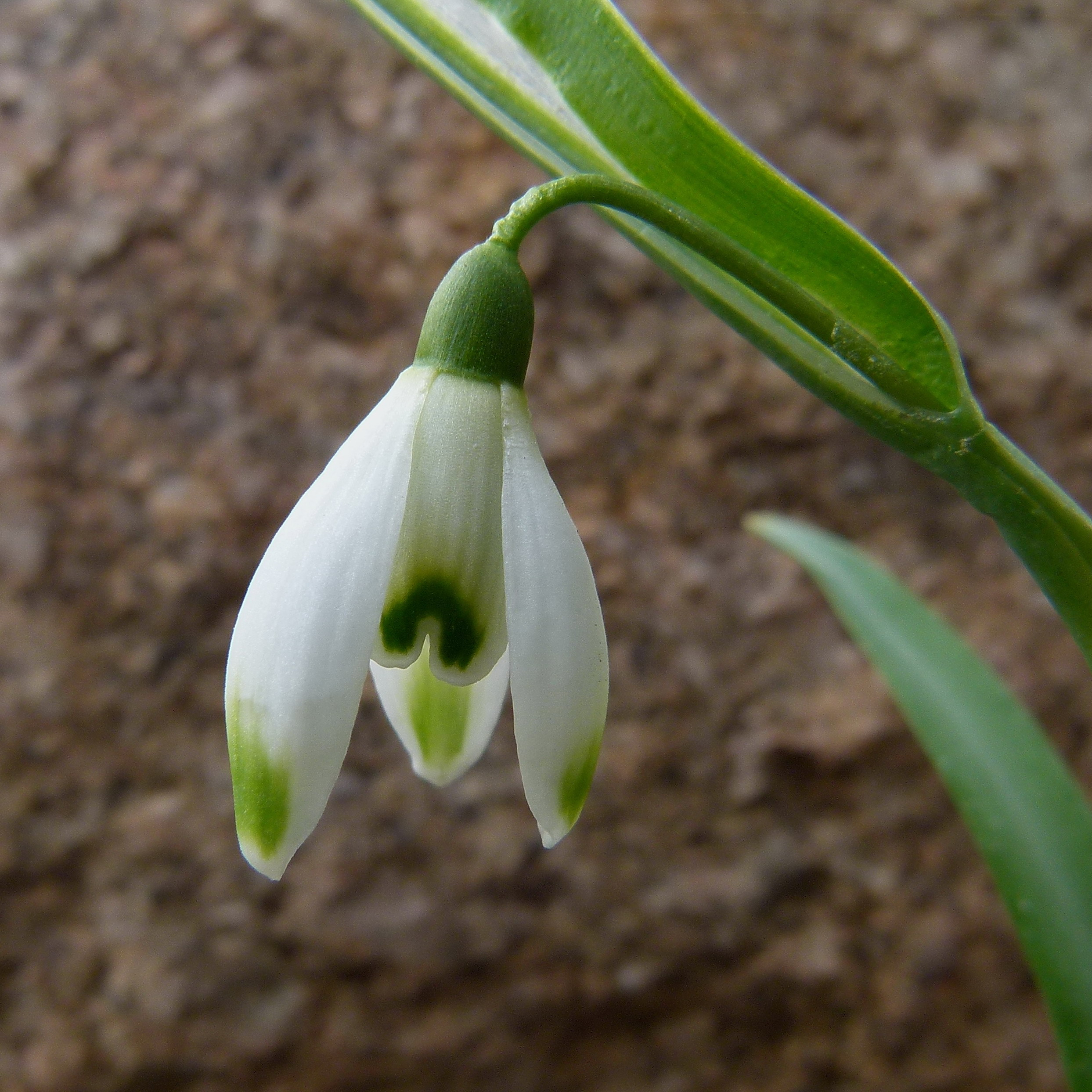
Galanthus nivalis 'Viridapice'

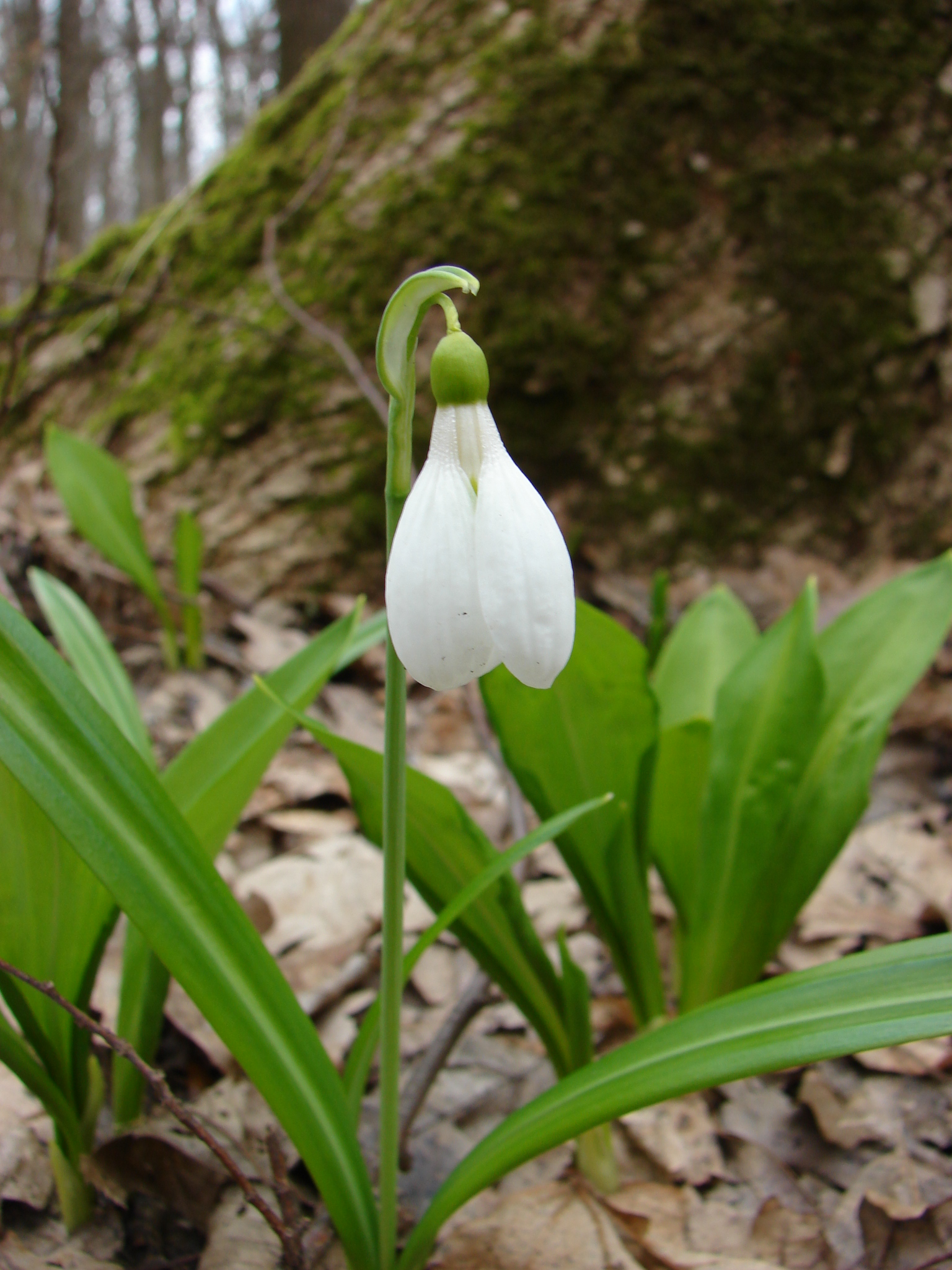
Galanthus plicatus

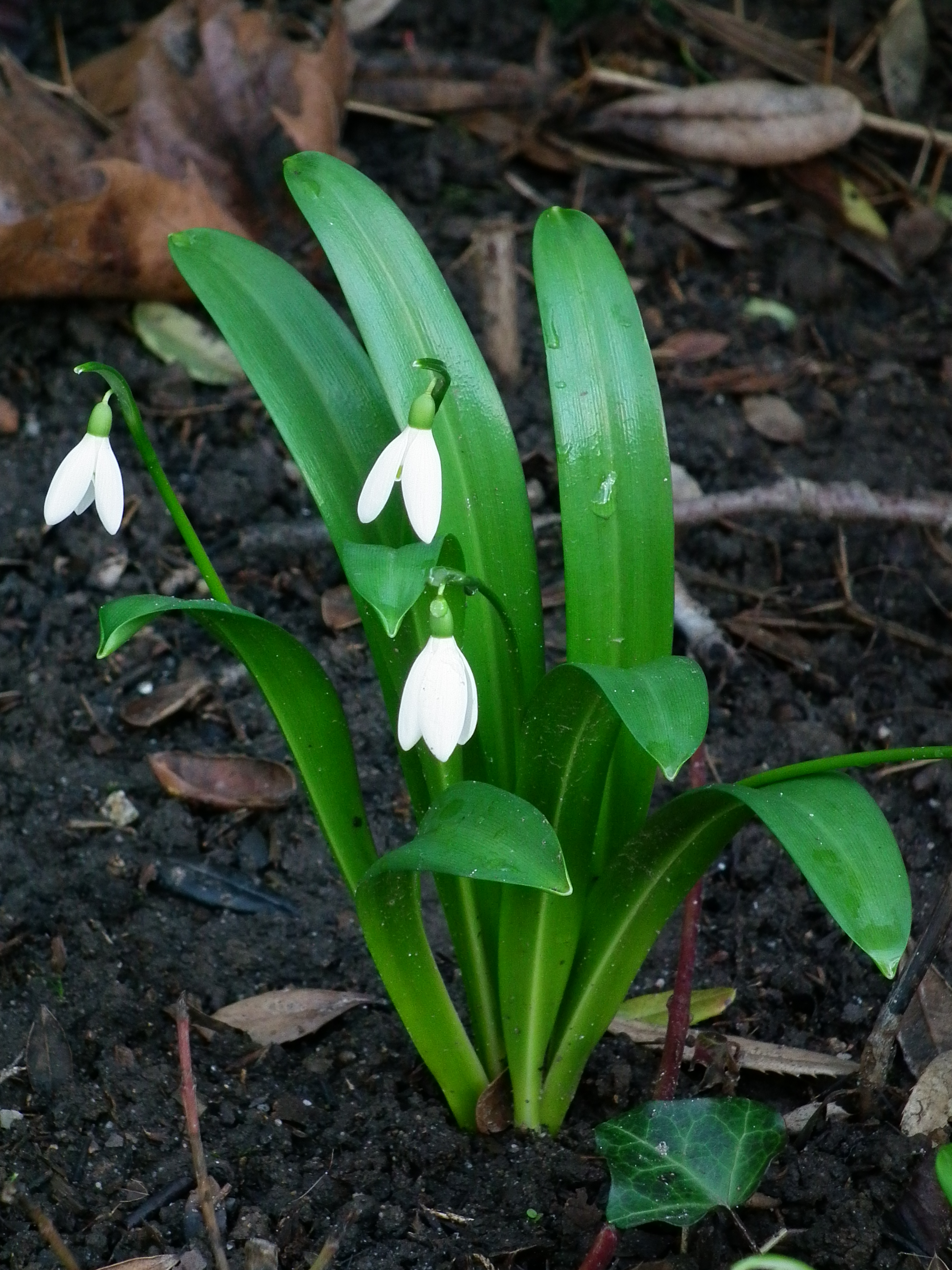
Galanthus woronowii

Galanthus has approximately 20 species, but new species continue to be described. G. trojanus was identified in Turkey in 2001. G. panjutinii (Panjutin's snowdrop) was discovered in 2012 in five locations in a small area (estimated at 20 km^{2} (7.7 sq mi)) of the northern Colchis area (western Transcaucasus) of Georgia and Russia. G. samothracicus was identified in Greece in 2014. Since it has not been subjected to genetic sequencing, it remains unplaced. It resembles G. nivalis, but is outside the distribution of that species.

Many species are difficult to identify, however, and traditional infrageneric classification based on plant morphology alone, such as those of Stern (1956), Traub (1963) and Davis (1999, 2001), has not reflected what is known about its evolutionary history, due to the morphological similarities among the species and relative lack of easily discernible distinguishing characteristics. Stern divided the genus into three series according to leaf vernation (the way the leaves are folded in the bud, when viewed in transverse section, see Description);

- section Nivales Beck (flat leaves)
- section Plicati Beck (plicate leaves)
- section Latifolii Stern (convolute leaves)

Stern further utilised characteristics such as the markings of the inner segments, length of the pedicels in relation to the spathe, and the colour and shape of the leaves in identifying and classifying species.

Traub considered them as subgenera;

- subgenus Galanthus
- subgenus Plicatanthus Traub & Moldk.
- subgenus Platyphyllanthe Traub

By contrast Davis, with much more information and specimens, included biogeography in addition to vernation, forming two series. He used somewhat different terminology for vernation, namely applanate (flat), explicative (plicate), and supervolute (convolute). He merged Nivalis and Plicati into series Galanthus, and divided Latifolii into two subseries, Glaucaefolii (Kem.-Nath) A.P.Davis and Viridifolii (Kem.-Nath) A.P.Davis.

Early molecular phylogenetic studies confirmed the genus was monophyletic and suggested four clades, which were labelled as series, and showed that Davis' subseries were not monophyletic. An expanded study in 2013 demonstrated seven major clades, corresponding to biogeographical distribution. This study used nuclear encoded nrITS (Nuclear ribosomal internal transcribed spacer), and plastid encoded genes matK (Maturase K), trnL-F, ndhF, and psbK–psbI, and examined all species recognised at the time, as well as two naturally occurring putative hybrids. The morphological characteristic of vernation that earlier authors had mainly relied on was shown to be highly homoplasious. A number of species, such as G. nivalis and G. elwesii demonstrated intraspecific biogeographical clades, indicating problems with speciation and there may be a need for recircumscription. These clades were assigned names, partly according to Davis' previous groupings. In this model clade, the group containing G. platyphyllus is sister to the rest of the genus.

By contrast, another study performed at the same time, using both nuclear and chloroplast DNA, but limited to the 14 species found in Turkey, largely confirmed Davis' series and subseries, and with biogeographical correlation. Series Galanthus in this study corresponded to clade nivalis, subseries Glaucaefolii with clade Elwesii and subseries Viridifolii with clades Woronowii and Alpinus. However, the model did not provide complete resolution.

==== Clades ====
Cladogram of evolutionary lines in Galanthus sensu Ronsted et al.

- Galanthus
  - Platyphyllus
  - - Trojanus
    - - - Ikariae
        - Elwesii
      - - Nivalis
        - - Woronowii
          - Alpinus

sensu Ronsted et al. 2013

- Platyphyllus clade (Caucasus, W. Transcaucasus, NE Turkey)
  - Galanthus krasnovii Khokhr. 1963
  - Galanthus platyphyllus Traub & Moldenke 1948
  - Galanthus panjutinii Zubov & A.P.Davis 2012
- Trojanus clade (NW Turkey)
  - Galanthus trojanus A.P.Davis & Özhatay 2001
- Ikariae clade (Aegean Islands)
  - Galanthus ikariae Baker 1893
- Elwesii clade (Turkey, Aegean Islands, SE Europe)
  - Galanthus cilicicus Baker 1897
  - Galanthus elwesii Hook.f. 1875 (2 variants)
  - Galanthus gracilis Celak. 1891
  - Galanthus peshmenii A.P.Davis & C.D.Brickell 1994
- Nivalis clade (Europe, NW Turkey)
  - Galanthus nivalis L. 1753
  - Galanthus plicatus M.Bieb. 1819 (2 subspecies)
  - Galanthus reginae-olgae Orph. 1874 (2 subspecies)
- Woronowii clade (Caucasus, E. and NE Turkey, N. Iran)
  - Galanthus fosteri Baker 1889
  - Galanthus lagodechianus Kem.-Nath. 1947
  - Galanthus rizehensis Stern 1956
  - Galanthus woronowii Losinsk. 1935
- Alpinus clade (Caucasus, NE Turkey, N.Iran)
  - Galanthus × allenii Baker 1891
  - Galanthus angustifolius Koss 1951
  - Galanthus alpinus Sosn. (2 variants) 1911
  - Galanthus koenenianus Lobin 1993
  - Galanthus transcaucasicus Fomin 1909
- Unplaced
  - Galanthus bursanus Zubov, Konca & A.P.Davis 2019 (NW Turkey)
  - Galanthus samothracicus Kit Tan & Biel 2014 (Greece)

Cladogram of evolutionary lines in Galanthus sensu Margoz et al.

- Galanthus
  - Viridifolii
  - - Glaucaefolii
    - Galanthus

Selected species

- Common snowdrop, Galanthus nivalis, grows to around 7–15 cm tall, flowering between January and April in the northern temperate zone (January–May in the wild). Applanate vernation. Grown as ornamental.
- Crimean snowdrop, Galanthus plicatus, 30 cm tall, flowering January/March, white flowers, with broad leaves folded back at the edges (explicative vernation).
- Giant snowdrop, Galanthus elwesii, a native of the Levant, 23 cm tall, flowering January/February, with large flowers, the three inner segments of which often have a much larger and more conspicuous green blotch (or blotches) than the more common kinds; supervolute vernation. Grown as ornamental.
- Galanthus reginae-olgae, from Greece and Sicily, is quite similar in appearance to G. nivalis, but flowers in autumn before the leaves appear. The leaves, which appear in the spring, have a characteristic white stripe on their upper side; applanate vernation.
  - G. reginae-olgae subsp. vernalis, from Sicily, northern Greece and the southern part of former Yugoslavia, blooms at the end of the winter with developed young leaves and is thus easily confused with G. nivalis.

=== Etymology ===
Galanthus is derived from the Greek γάλα (gala), meaning "milk" and ἄνθος (anthos) meaning "flower", alluding to the colour of the flowers. The epithet nivalis is derived from the Latin, meaning "of the snow". The word "Snowdrop" may be derived from the German Schneetropfen (snow-drop), the tear drop shaped pearl earrings popular in the sixteenth and seventeenth centuries. Other, earlier, common names include Candlemas bells, fair maids of February, and white ladies (see Symbolism).

== Ecology ==
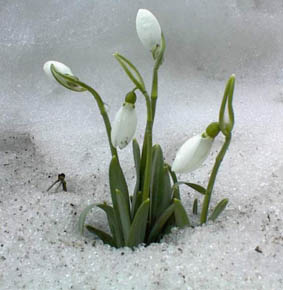
G. nivalis piercing snow cover

Snowdrops are hardy herbaceous plants that perennate by underground bulbs. They are among the earliest spring bulbs to bloom, although a few forms of G. nivalis are autumn flowering. In colder climates, they will emerge through snow (see illustration). To help against the cold and possible damage caused by ice crystals forming on the plant, they are coated in an enzyme that inhibits the creation of these crystals. They naturalise relatively easily forming large drifts. These are often sterile, found near human habitation, and also former monastic sites. The leaves die back a few weeks after the flowers have faded. Galanthus plants are relatively vigorous and may spread rapidly by forming bulb offsets. They also spread by dispersal of seed, animals disturbing bulbs, and water if disturbed by floods.

== Conservation ==
Some snowdrop species are threatened in their wild habitats, due to habitat destruction, illegal collecting, and climate change. In most countries collecting bulbs from the wild is now illegal. Under CITES regulations, international trade in any quantity of Galanthus, whether bulbs, live plants, or even dead ones, is illegal without a CITES permit. This applies to hybrids and named cultivars, as well as species. CITES lists all species, but allows a limited trade in wild-collected bulbs of just three species (G. nivalis, G. elwesii, and G. woronowii) from Turkey and Georgia. A number of species are on the IUCN Red List of threatened species, with the conservation status being G. trojanus as critically endangered, four species vulnerable, G. nivalis is near threatened and several species show decreasing populations. G. panjutinii is considered endangered. One of its five known sites, at Sochi, was destroyed by preparations for the 2014 Winter Olympics.

== Cultivation ==
Galanthus species and cultivars are extremely popular as symbols of spring and are traded more than any other wild-source ornamental bulb genus. Millions of bulbs are exported annually from Turkey and Georgia. For instance export quotas for 2016 for G. elwesii were 7 million for Turkey. Quotas for G. worononowii were 5 million for Turkey and 15 million for Georgia. These figures include both wild-taken and artificially propagated bulbs.

=== Snowdrop gardens ===
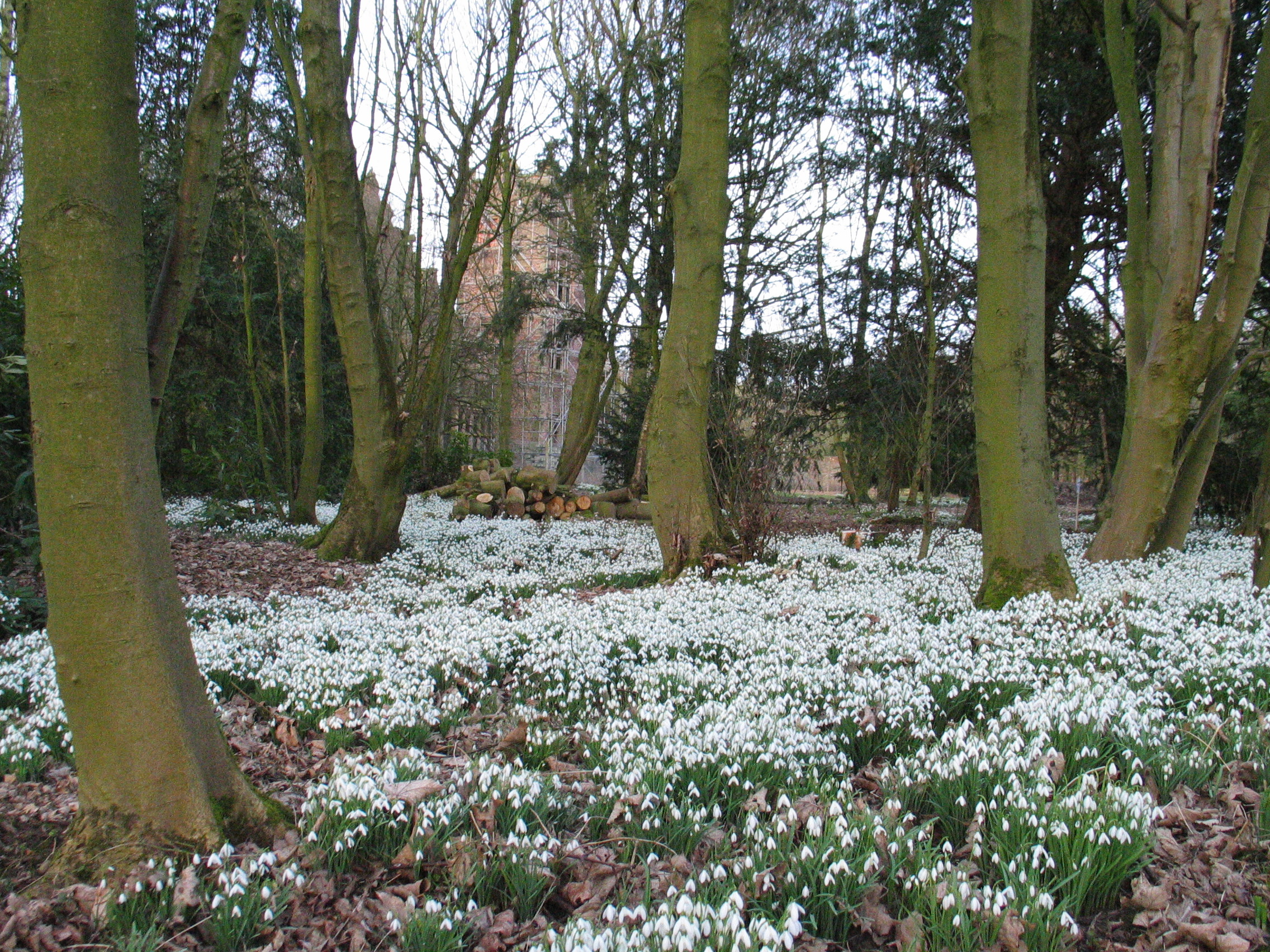
Snowdrop carpet at Bank Hall, Bretherton, Lancashire in February 2009

Celebrated as a sign of spring, snowdrops may form impressive carpets of white in areas where they are native or have been naturalised. These displays may attract large numbers of sightseers. There are a number of snowdrop gardens in England, Wales, Scotland, and Ireland. Several gardens open specially in February for visitors to admire the flowers. Sixty gardens took part in Scotland's first Snowdrop Festival (1 Feb–11 March 2007). Several gardens in England open during snowdrop season for the National Gardens Scheme (NGS) and in Scotland for Scotland's Gardens. Colesbourne Park in Gloucestershire is one of the best known of the English snowdrop gardens, being the home of Henry John Elwes, a collector of Galanthus specimens, and after whom Galanthus elwesii is named.

=== Cultivars ===
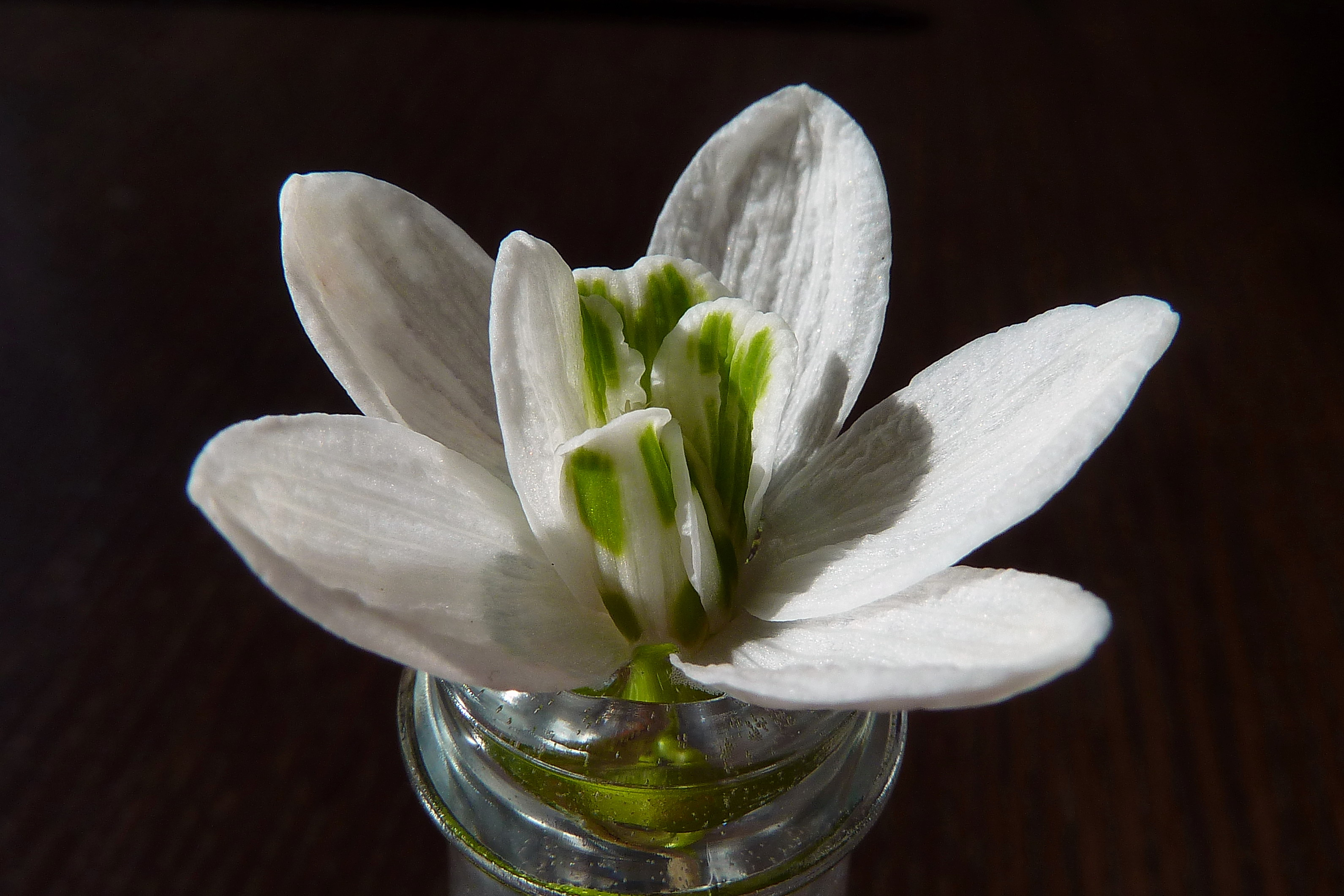
Snowdrop with extra tepals (mutation)

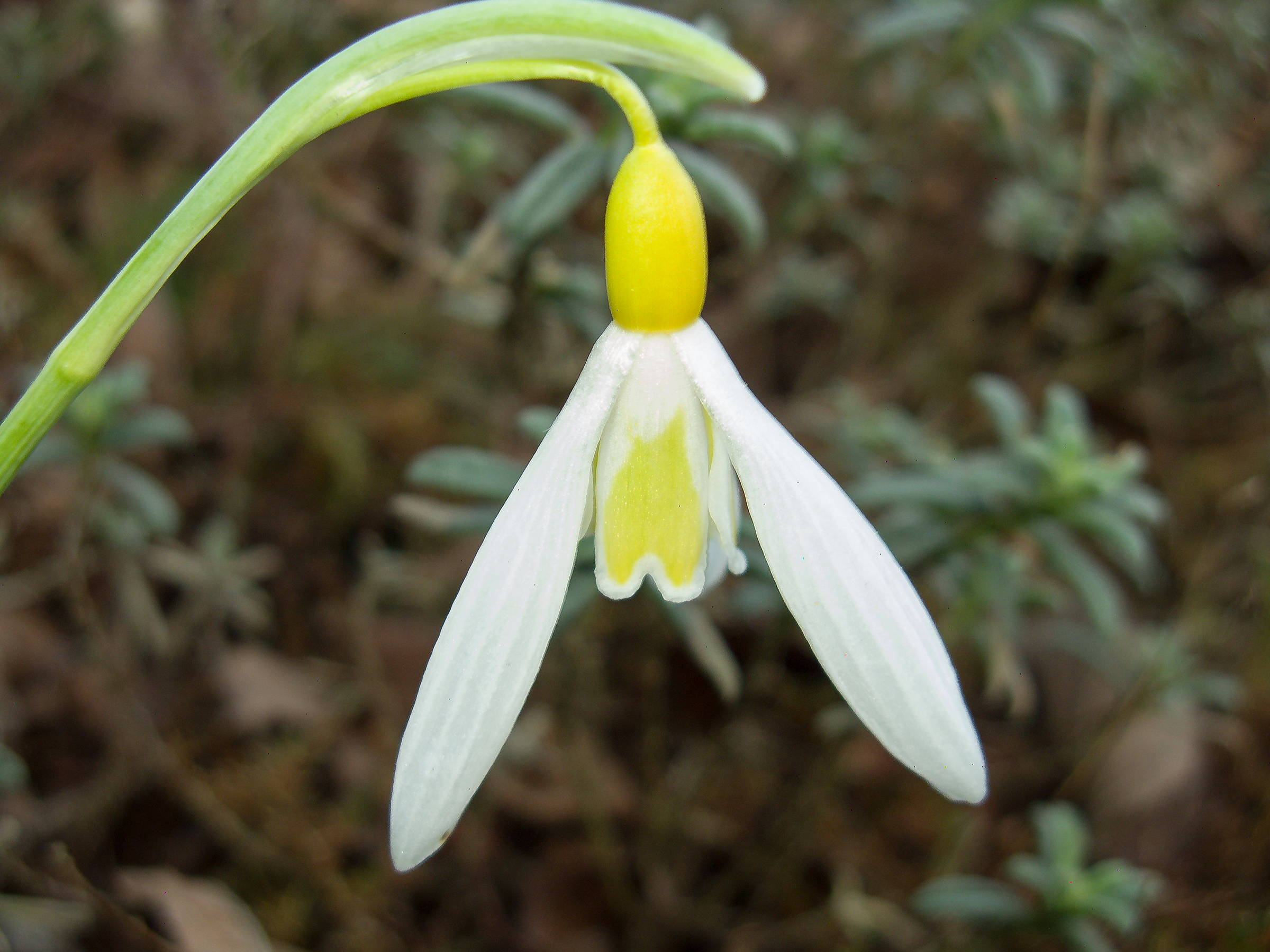
Galanthus plicatus 'Wendy's Gold' has yellow markings and ovary.

Numerous single- and double-flowered cultivars of Galanthus nivalis are known, and also of several other Galanthus species, particularly G. plicatus and G. elwesii. Also, many hybrids between these and other species exist (more than 500 cultivars are described in Bishop, Davis, and Grimshaw's book, plus lists of many cultivars that have now been lost, and others not seen by the authors). They differ particularly in the size, shape, and markings of the flower, the period of flowering, and other characteristics, mainly of interest to the keen (even fanatical) snowdrop collectors, known as "galanthophiles", who hold meetings where the scarcer cultivars change hands. Double-flowered cultivars and forms, such as the extremely common Galanthus nivalis f. pleniflorus 'Flore Pleno', may be less attractive to some people, but they can have greater visual impact in a garden setting. Cultivars with yellow markings and ovaries rather than the usual green are also grown, such as 'Wendy's Gold'. Many hybrids have also occurred in cultivation.

=== Awards ===
As of July 2017, the following have gained the Royal Horticultural Society's Award of Garden Merit:

- Galanthus 'Ailwyn'
- Galanthus 'Atkinsii'
- Galanthus 'Bertram Anderson'
- Galanthus elwesii
- Galanthus elwesii 'Comet'
- Galanthus elwesii 'Godfrey Owen'
- Galanthus elwesii 'Mrs Macnamara'
- Galanthus elwesii var. monostictus
- Galanthus 'John Gray'
- Galanthus 'Lady Beatrix Stanley'
- Galanthus 'Magnet'
- Galanthus 'Merlin'
- Galanthus nivalis
- Galanthus nivalis f. pleniflorus 'Flore Pleno'
- Galanthus nivalis 'Viridapice'
- Galanthus plicatus
- Galanthus plicatus 'Augustus'
- Galanthus plicatus 'Diggory'
- Galanthus plicatus 'Three Ships'
- Galanthus reginae-olgae subsp. reginae-olgae
- Galanthus 'S. Arnott'
- Galanthus 'Spindlestone Surprise'
- Galanthus 'Straffan'
- Galanthus 'Trumps'
- Galanthus woronowii

=== Propagation ===
Propagation is by offset bulbs, either by careful division of clumps in full growth ("in the green"), or removed when the plants are dormant, immediately after the leaves have withered; or by seeds sown either when ripe, or in spring. Professional growers and keen amateurs also use such methods as "twin-scaling" to increase the stock of choice cultivars quickly.

== Toxicity ==
Snowdrops contain an active lectin or agglutinin named GNA for Galanthus nivalis agglutinin.

== Medicinal use ==
In 1983, Andreas Plaitakis and Roger Duvoisin suggested that the mysterious magical herb, moly, that appears in Homer's Odyssey is the snowdrop. One of the active principles present in the snowdrop is the alkaloid galantamine, which, as an acetylcholinesterase inhibitor, could have acted as an antidote to Circe's poisons. Further supporting this notion are notes made during the fourth century BC by the Greek scholar Theophrastus who wrote in Historia plantarum that moly was "used as an antidote against poisons" although which specific poisons it was effective against remains unclear. Galantamine (or galanthamine) may be helpful in the treatment of Alzheimer's disease, although it is not a cure; the substance also occurs naturally in daffodils and other narcissi.

== In popular culture ==
Blow, Northern Wind

low, northern wind; fall snow;
And thou—my loved and dear,
See, in this waste of burthened cloud
How Spring is near!

— Walter de la Mare (1950)

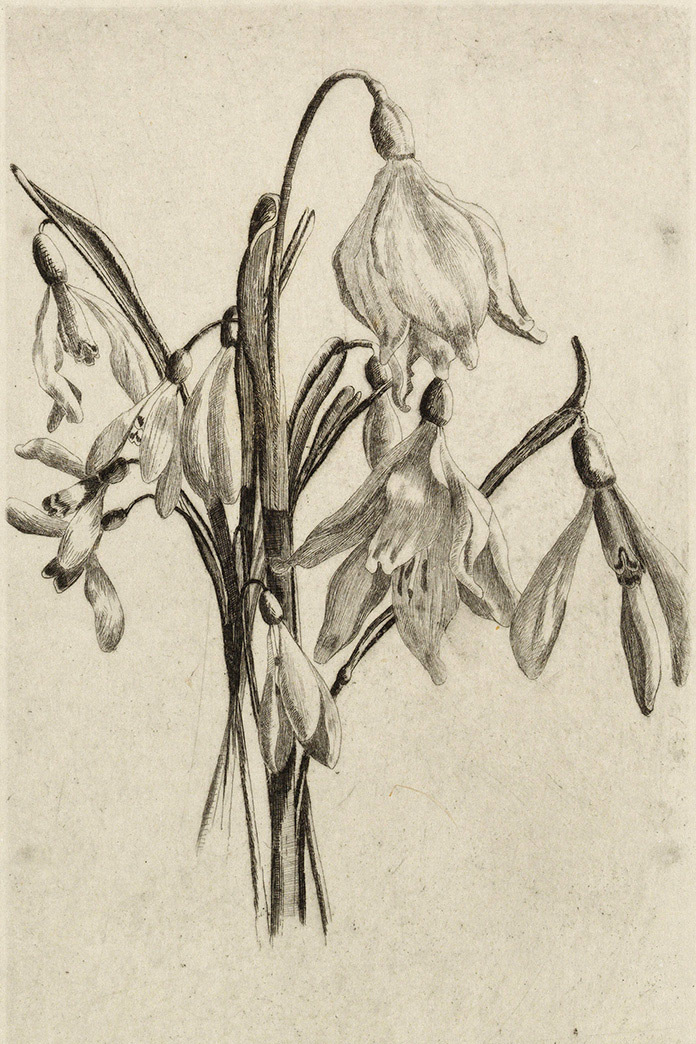

Snowdrops figure prominently in art and literature, often as a symbol in poetry of spring, purity, and religion (see Symbols), such as Walter de la Mare's poem The Snowdrop (1929). In this poem, he likened the triple tepals in each whorl ("A triplet of green-pencilled snow") to the Holy Trinity. He used snowdrop imagery several times in his poetry, such as Blow, Northern Wind (1950) – see Box. Another instance is the poem The Snowdrop. by Letitia Elizabeth Landon in which she asks "Thou fairy gift from summer, Why art thou blooming now?"

- In the fairy-tale play The Twelve Months by Russian writer Samuil Marshak, a greedy queen decrees that a basket of gold coins shall be rewarded to anyone who can bring her galanthus flowers in the dead of winter. A young orphan girl is sent out during a snow storm by her cruel stepmother to find the spirits of the 12 months of the year, who take pity on her and not only save her from freezing to death, but also make it possible for her to gather the flowers even in winter. The Soviet traditionally animated film The Twelve Months (1956), Lenfilm film The Twelve Months (1972), and the anime film Twelve Months (1980) (Sekai meisaku dowa mori wa ikiteiru in Japan), are based on this fairy-tale play.
- "Snowdrops" was the nickname that the British people gave during the Second World War to the military police of the United States Army (who were stationed in the UK preparatory to the invasion of the continent) because they wore a white helmet, gloves, gaiters, and Sam Browne belt against their olive drab uniforms.
- In the German fairy tale, Snow White and the Seven Dwarfs, "Snowdrop" is used as an alternate name for the Princess Snow White.
- The short story The Snowdrop by Hans Christian Andersen follows the fate of a snowdrop from a bulb striving toward the light to a picked flower placed in a book of poetry.
- Russian composer Tchaikovsky wrote a series of 12 piano pieces, each one named after a month of the year with a second name suggesting something associated with that month. His "April" piece is subnamed "Snow Drop". The Russian climate having a later spring, and winter ending a bit later than in other places.
- Johann Strauss II named his very successful waltz Schneeglöckchen (Snowdrops) op. 143 after this flower. The inspiration is especially evident in the cello introduction and in the slow unfurling of the opening waltz. Strauss composed this piece for a Russian Embassy dinner given at the Sperl ballroom in Vienna on 2 December 1853, but did not perform it publicly until the year 1854. The Sperl banquet was given in honour of her Excellency Frau Maria von Kalergis, daughter of the Russian diplomat and foreign minister Count Karl Nesselrode, and Strauss also dedicated his waltz to her.
- In the 2007 film, Stardust, a glass snowdrop flower is gifted to the female protagonist, and serves to protect the bearer from all Witches' magic and bring them good luck.

=== Symbolism ===
Early names refer to the association with the religious feast of Candlemas (February 2) – the optimum flowering time of the plant – at which young women, robed in white, would walk in solemn procession in commemoration of the Purification of the Virgin, an alternative name for the feast day. The French name of violette de la chandaleur refers to Candlemas, while an Italian name, fiore della purificazione, refers to purification. The German name of Schneeglöckchen (little snow bells) invokes the symbol of bells.

In the language of flowers, the snowdrop is synonymous with 'hope' (and the goddess Persephone's/Proserpina's return from Hades), as it blooms in early springtime, just before the vernal equinox, and so, is seen as 'heralding' the new spring and new year.

In more recent times, the snowdrop was adopted as a symbol of sorrow and of hope following the Dunblane massacre in Scotland, and lent its name to the subsequent campaign to restrict the legal ownership of handguns in the UK.

== See also ==
- List of snowdrop gardens
- 1250 Galanthus, an asteroid named after Galanthus.

== Bibliography ==
=== Books ===
- Bishop, Matt; Davis, Aaron; Grimshaw, John (2001). Snowdrops: a Monograph of Cultivated Galanthus. Griffin Press. ISBN 978-0-9541916-0-3.
- Church, Arthur Harry (1908). Types of floral mechanism; a selection of diagrams and descriptions of common flowers arranged as an introduction to the systematic study of angiosperms. Oxford University Press. ISBN 978-1-313-22387-4.
- Cox, Freda (2013). Gardener's Guide to Snowdrops. Ramsbury: Crowood. p. 256. ISBN 978-1-84797-562-1.
- Cullen, James; Knees, Sabina G.; Cubey, H. Suzanne Cubey, eds. (2011). The European Garden Flora, Flowering Plants: A Manual for the Identification of Plants Cultivated in Europe, Both Out-of-Doors and Under Glass (vol. 1. Alismataceae to Orchidaceae) (2nd ed.). Cambridge: Cambridge University Press. ISBN 978-0-521-76147-5.
- Dahlgren, R.M.; Clifford, H.T.; Yeo, P.F. (1985). The families of the monocotyledons. Berlin: Springer-Verlag. ISBN 978-3-642-64903-5.
- Davis, Aaron (1999). The genus Galanthus. A Botanical Magazine monograph. Portland, OR: Timber Press. ISBN 978-0-88192-431-2.
  - Harvey, M.J. (21 May 2000). "Davis: The genus Galanthus" (Book Review). Botanical Electronic News (250).
- de la Mare, Walter (1950). Inward Companion. London: Faber and Faber. p. 39.
- Ellacombe, Henry Nicholson (1895). In a Gloucestershire Garden. London: Edward Arnold.
- Harland, Gail (2016). Snowdrop. London: Reaktion Books. ISBN 978-1-78023-628-5.
- Hyam, R. & Pankhurst, R.J. (1995). Plants and their names: a concise dictionary. Oxford: Oxford University Press. pp. 202, 342. ISBN 978-0-19-866189-4.
- Kubitzki, K., ed. (1998). The families and genera of vascular plants. Vol.3. Berlin: Springer-Verlag. ISBN 978-3-540-64060-8.
- Rina Kamenetsky; Hiroshi Okubo, eds. (2012). Ornamental Geophytes: From Basic Science to Sustainable Production. CRC Press. ISBN 978-1-4398-4924-8.
  - Chapter 2. Alan Meerow. Taxonomy and Phylogeny. pp. 17–55
- Kaplan, Matt (27 October 2015). Science of the magical: from the Holy Grail to love potions to superpowers (First Scribner hardcover ed.). New York. ISBN 978-1-4767-7710-8. OCLC 904813040.
- Pavord, Anna (2005). The naming of names the search for order in the world of plants. New York: Bloomsbury. ISBN 978-1-59691-965-5.
- Slade, Naomi (2014). The Plant Lover's Guide to Snowdrops. Timber Press. ISBN 978-1-60469-607-3.
- Stern, Frederick Claude (1956). Snowdrops and Snowflakes – a study of the genera Galanthus and Leucojum. Royal Horticultural Society.
- Stearn, William T (1992) [1966]. Botanical Latin: history, grammar, syntax, terminology and vocabulary (4th ed.). Portland, OR: Timber Press. ISBN 978-0-88192-321-6.
- Traub, H.P. (1963). Genera of the Amaryllidaceae. Genera of organisms. La Jolla, CA: American Plant Life Society. Archived from the original on 1 October 2018.
- Waldorf, Gunter (2012). Snowdrops. London: Frances Lincoln. p. 160. ISBN 978-0-7112-3385-0.

==== Chapters ====
- Brickell, CD. "Galanthus". In Cullen et al. (2011), pp. 222–225.
- Davis, AP. "The genus Galanthus – snowdrops in the wild". In Bishop et al. (2001), pp. 9–63.
- Meerow, AW; Snijman, DA. "Flowering Plants · Monocotyledons". In Kubitzki (1998), pp. 83–110.

==== Historical (chronological) ====
- Theophrastus (1916) [4th century BC]. Hort, Arthur (ed.). Περὶ φυτῶν ἱστορία [Historia plantarum (Theophrastus: Enquiry into Plants &c.)]. Vol. ii. London and New York: William Heinemann and G.P. Putnam's Sons: Loeb Classical Library. ISBN 978-0-674-99077-7.
- Plinius Secundus, Gaius (Pliny the Elder) (1906) [77–79 AD]. Mayhoff, Karl Friedrich Theodor (ed.). "Naturalis Historia". Perseus Digital Library. Leipzig: Teubner. (see also, Naturalis Historia)
- Vergilius Maro, Publius (Virgil) (1770). Davidson, Joseph (ed.). The Works of Virgil: Translated Into English Prose, as Near the Original as the Different Idioms of the Latin and English Languages Will Allow & etc (5th ed.). London: J Beecroft et al.
  - Martyn, John (1820) [1749]. P. Virgilii Maronis Bucolicorum eclogæ decem: The Bucolicks of Virgil, with an English translation and notes (4th ed.). London: G. and W.B. Whittaker. (see also, Bucolics)
- Gerard, John (1597). The Herball or Generall Historie of Plantes (1st ed.). London: John Norton.
- Linnaeus, Carl (1753). Species Plantarum: exhibentes plantas rite cognitas, ad genera relatas, cum differentiis specificis, nominibus trivialibus, synonymis selectis, locis natalibus, secundum systema sexuale digestas. Stockholm: Impensis Laurentii Salvii. see also Species Plantarum
- Adanson, Michel (1763). Familles des plantes. Paris: Vincent.
- Jussieu, Antoine Laurent de (1789). Genera Plantarum, secundum ordines naturales disposita juxta methodum in Horto Regio Parisiensi exaratam. Paris: apud viduam Herissant et Theophilum Barrois.
- Lamarck, Jean-Baptiste (1783–1808). Encyclopédie méthodique. Botanique. Paris: Panckoucke. (see Encyclopédie méthodique)
- Lamarck, Jean-Baptiste (1793). Tableau encyclopédique et méthodique des trois règnes de la nature. Botanique. Illustrations des genres II. Paris: Panckoucke.
- Historia et commentationes Academiae Electoralis Scientiarvm et Elegantiorvm Litterarvm Theodoro-Palatinae, Volume 6. Manheim: Typis Academicis. 1790.
- Jaume Saint-Hilaire, Jean Henri (1805). Exposition de familles naturales. Paris: Treutel et Würtz.
- Brown, Robert (1810). Prodromus florae Novae Hollandiae et Insulae Van-Diemen, exhibens characteres plantarum. London: Taylor.
- de Candolle, Augustin Pyramus (1813). Théorie élémentaire de la botanique, ou exposition des principes de la classification naturelle et de l'art de décrire et d'etudier les végétaux (in French).
- de Lamarck, Jean-Baptiste; de Candolle, Augustin Pyramus (1815). Flore française ou descriptions succinctes de toutes les plantes qui croissent naturellement en France disposées selon une nouvelle méthode d'analyse; et précédées par un exposé des principes élémentaires de la botanique. vol. III (3rd ed.). Paris: Desray.
- Lindley, John (1830). An introduction to the natural system of botany: or, A systematic view of the organisation, natural affinities, and geographical distribution, of the whole vegetable kingdom: together with the uses of the most important species in medicine, the arts, and rural or domestic economy. London: Longman.
- Lindley, John (1853) [1846]. The Vegetable Kingdom: or, The structure, classification, and uses of plants, illustrated upon the natural system (3rd ed.). London: Bradbury & Evans.
- Bentham, G.; Hooker, J. D. (1883). Genera plantarum ad exemplaria imprimis in herbariis kewensibus servata definita (3 vols. 1865–1883) (in Latin). London: L Reeve & Co.

=== Articles ===
- Clos, M.D. (June 1862). "Discussion de quelques points de glossologie botanique: revue critique des dénominations françaises des plantes". Bulletin de la Société Botanique de France. 9 (9): 652–666. doi:10.1080/00378941.1862.10836554.
- Davis, Aaron P; Özhatay, Neriman (2001). "Galanthus trojanus: a new species of Galanthus (Amaryllidaceae) from north-western Turkey" (PDF). Botanical Journal of the Linnean Society. 137 (4): 409–412. doi:10.1111/j.1095-8339.2001.tb02335.x. Archived (PDF) from the original on 9 October 2022.
- Ewen, Stanley W. B. & Pusztai, Árpád (1999). "Effect of diets containing genetically modified potatoes expressing Galanthus nivalis lectin on rat small intestine". The Lancet. 354 (9187): 1353–1354. doi:10.1016/S0140-6736(98)05860-7. PMID 10533866. S2CID 17252112.
- Fishchuk, Oksana & Odintsova, A. (August 2020). "Micromorphology and anatomy of the flowers of Galanthus nivalis and Leucojum vernum (Amaryllidaceae)". Regulatory Mechanisms in Biosystems. 11 (3): 463–468. doi:10.15421/022071. S2CID 229370844.
- Hester, Gerko; Kaku, Hanae; Goldstein, Irwin J. & Schubert Wright, Christine (1995). "Structure of mannose-specific snowdrop (Galanthus nivalis) lectin is representative of a new plant lectin family". Nature Structural Biology. 2 (6): 472–479. doi:10.1038/nsb0695-472. PMID 7664110. S2CID 45031999.
- Larsen, Maja Mellergaard; Adsersen, Anne; Davis, Aaron P.; Lledó, M. Dolores; Jäger, Anna K.; Rønsted, Nina (October 2010). "Using a phylogenetic approach to selection of target plants in drug discovery of acetylcholinesterase inhibiting alkaloids in Amaryllidaceae tribe Galantheae". Biochemical Systematics and Ecology. 38 (5): 1026–1034. Bibcode:2010BioSE..38.1026L. doi:10.1016/j.bse.2010.10.005.
- Lledó, Ma D.; Davis, A. P.; Crespo, M. B.; Chase, M. W.; Fay, M. F. (14 June 2004). "Phylogenetic analysis of Leucojum and Galanthus (Amaryllidaceae) based on plastid matK and nuclear ribosomal spacer (ITS) DNA sequences and morphology". Plant Systematics and Evolution. 246 (3–4): 223. Bibcode:2004PSyEv.246..223L. doi:10.1007/s00606-004-0152-0. S2CID 43826738.
- Loy, C; Schneider, L (25 January 2006). "Galantamine for Alzheimer's disease and mild cognitive impairment". Cochrane Database of Systematic Reviews. 2009 (1). CD001747. doi:10.1002/14651858.CD001747.pub3. PMC 8961200. PMID 16437436.
- Meerow, A. W.; Fay, M.F.; Guy, C.L.; Li, Q.-B.; Zaman, F.Q.; Chase, M.W. (1999). "Systematics of Amaryllidaceae based on cladistic analysis of plastid rbcL and trnL-F sequence data". Am. J. Bot. 86 (9): 1325–1345. doi:10.2307/2656780. JSTOR 2656780. PMID 10487820.
- Meerow, AW; Francisco-Ortega, J; Schnell, RJ (2006). "Phylogenetic relationships and biogeography within the Eurasian clade of Amaryllidaceae based on plastid ndhF and nrDNA ITS sequences: lineage sorting in a reticulate area?". Systematic Botany. 31 (1): 42–60. Bibcode:2006SysBo..31...42M. doi:10.1600/036364406775971787. JSTOR 25064128. S2CID 85953035. Archived from the original on 25 February 2021.
- Mi, Xiaoxiao; Liu, Xue; Yan, Haolu; Liang, Lina; Zhou, Xiangyan; Yang, Jiangwei; Si, Huaijun; Zhang, Ning (January 2017). "Expression of the Galanthus nivalis agglutinin (GNA) gene in transgenic potato plants confers resistance to aphids". Comptes Rendus Biologies. 340 (1): 7–12. doi:10.1016/j.crvi.2016.10.003. PMID 27938939.
- Plaitakis, Andreas & Duvoisin, Roger C. (1983). "Homer's moly identified as Galanthus nivalis L.: physiologic antidote to stramonium poisoning". Clinical Neuropharmacology. 6 (1): 1–6. doi:10.1097/00002826-198303000-00001. PMID 6342763. S2CID 19839512.
- Rønsted, Nina; Zubov, Dimitri; Bruun-Lund, Sam; Davis, Aaron P. (October 2013). "Snowdrops falling slowly into place: An improved phylogeny for Galanthus (Amaryllidaceae)". Molecular Phylogenetics and Evolution. 69 (1): 205–217. Bibcode:2013MolPE..69..205R. doi:10.1016/j.ympev.2013.05.019. PMID 23747523.
- Semerdjieva, Ivanka; Sidjimova, Boryana; Yankova-Tsvetkova, Elina; Kostova, Milena; Zheljazkov, Valtcho (December 2019). "Study on Galanthus species in the Bulgarian flora". Heliyon. 5 (12) E03021. Bibcode:2019Heliy...503021S. doi:10.1016/j.heliyon.2019.e03021. PMC 7191607. PMID 32373724.
- Taşci Margoz, Nivart; Yüzbaşioğlu, İbrahim Sırrı; Çelen, Zeynep; Ekim, Tuna; Bilgin, Ayşe Neşe (2013). "Molecular phylogeny of Galanthus (Amaryllidaceae) of Anatolia inferred from multiple nuclear and chloroplast DNA regions". Turkish Journal of Botany. 37: 993–1007. Bibcode:2013TJBot..37..993T. doi:10.3906/bot-1209-41.
- Tan, Kit; Siljak-Yakovlev, Sonja; Biel, Burkhard (2014). "Galanthus samothracicus (Amaryllidaceae) from the island of Samothraki, northeastern Greece". Phytologica Balcanica. 20 (1): 6570.
- Zubov, Dmitriy A.; Davis, Aaron P. (20 April 2012). "Galanthus panjutinii sp. nov.: a new name for an invalidly published species of Galanthus (Amaryllidaceae) from the northern Colchis area of Western Transcaucasia" (PDF). Phytotaxa. 50 (1): 55. Bibcode:2012Phytx..50...55Z. doi:10.11646/phytotaxa.50.1.5. Archived (PDF) from the original on 9 October 2022.

=== Websites ===
- de la Mare, Walter (1929). "The Snowdrop" – via Poetry Nook.
- Ellis, Siân (1 May 2010). "Snowdrops and Strange Galanthophiles". British Heritage Travel. British Heritage Society.
- Hollinger, Jason. "Plant Latin". Archived from the original on 13 October 2016.
- Kemp, Peter (1989). "STRAUSS II, J.: Edition - Vol. 7". Naxos.
- McGivern, Mark (12 March 2016). "Dunblane 20 years on: Scotland unites to pay tribute". Daily Record.
- Randerson, James (15 January 2008). "Árpád Pusztai: Biological Divide". The Guardian. London.

==== Images ====
- "Digital Collections: Galanthus" (Botanical illustrations). New York Public Library. 2016.
- "Vernation patterns in Galanthus" (Figure). hort.net., in Stearn (1992)
- "Leaf vernation" (Figure). Kehan Harman: An Interactive Key to the Genus Galanthus L., in Davis (1999)

==== Organisations ====
- Convention on International Trade in Endangered Species of Wild Fauna and Flora (Report). 3 March 1973 [Amended on 22 June 1979, Amended on 30 April 1983]. Convention (PDF) (Report). Archived (PDF) from the original on 9 October 2022.
  - "Appendices". 1973 [valid from 14 February 2021]. "Appendices" (PDF). Archived (PDF) from the original on 9 October 2022.
- MBG. "Missouri Botanical Garden".
  - Stevens, P.F. (2016) [2001], Angiosperm Phylogeny Website, Missouri Botanical Garden
- RBG. "Royal Botanic Gardens Kew". Board of Trustees of the Royal Botanic Gardens, Kew.
  - "World Checklist of Selected Plant Families". The Board of Trustees of the Royal Botanic Gardens, Kew.
  - "Davis, Aaron P". Royal Botanical Gardens Kew.
  - "Galanthus nivalis (common snowdrop)". Royal Botanic Garden Kew.
- HPS. "Hardy Plant Society". Kent.
- "Shepton Mallet Horticultural Society". Shepton Mallet, Somerset. 2011. Archived from the original on 16 February 2020.
