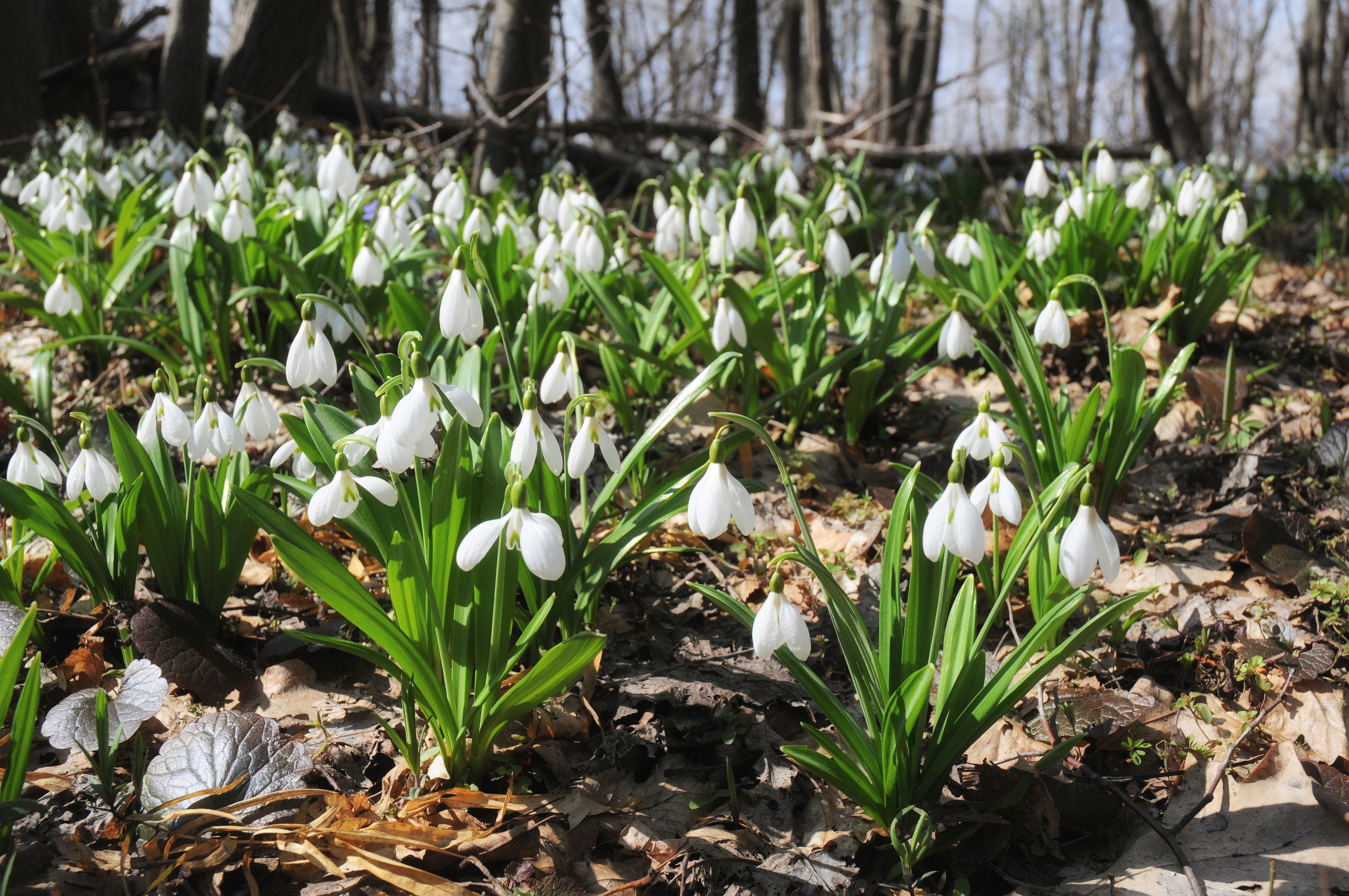
- In habitat in Ukraine

Conservation status
- Least Concern (IUCN 3.1)
- CITES Appendix II

Scientific classification
- Kingdom: Plantae
- Clade: Embryophytes
- Clade: Tracheophytes
- Clade: Spermatophytes
- Clade: Angiosperms
- Clade: Monocots
- Order: Asparagales
- Family: Amaryllidaceae
- Subfamily: Amaryllidoideae
- Genus: Galanthus
- Species: G. plicatus

Binomial name
- Galanthus plicatus M.Bieb.

= Galanthus plicatus =

Species of flowering plant

Galanthus plicatus, the pleated snowdrop, is a species of flowering plant in the family Amaryllidaceae, native to eastern Europe and western Asia. It is a spring flowering bulbous herbaceous perennial.

== Description ==
Galanthus plicatus grows to about 15 cm (5.9 in) tall. Its leaves are bluish or greyish green, broader than those of many other species of Galanthus, up to 2 cm (0.79 in) wide. The leaf edges are folded back away from the upper surface of the leaf, both in bud and after they expand. The nodding white flowers appear in very early spring, and are among the very first plants to flower. They have six white tepals. The outer three are all white, 2–3 cm (0.79–1.18 in) long; the inner three are shorter and notched, with a green mark above the notch, often extending to beyond the middle of the tepal. In G. plicatus subsp. byzantinus, the inner tepals also have a green mark at the base.

== Taxonomy ==
Galanthus plicatus was first described by the German biologist Friedrich Marschall von Bieberstein in 1819. In 1893, Baker described Galanthus byzantinus from north-western Turkey as a separate species, differing in possessing green marks at the base as well as the tip of the inner three tepals. It is now usually treated as a subspecies of G. plicatus.

=== Subspecies ===
Two subspecies are recognized:

- Galanthus plicatus subsp. byzantinus (Baker) D.A.Webb – north-west Turkey
- Galanthus plicatus subsp. plicatus – throughout the range of the species

== Distribution and habitat ==
Galanthus plicatus occurs from eastern Europe (Romania, Ukraine and Crimea) through Turkey to the north-west Caucasus. G. plicatus subsp. plicatus is found throughout the range of the species, G. plicatus subsp. byzantinus only in north-west Turkey. The species is found in woodland and scrub, usually in shade. Ii is a red book species in Ukraine, and in the Crimean Tatar language it is called aqbardaq 'white cup'.

== Cultivation ==
Galanthus plicatus and the cultivar 'Three Ships' are both recipients of the Royal Horticultural Society's Award of Garden Merit. The cultivar 'Wendy's Gold' has a yellow ovary and yellow markings on the inner petals.

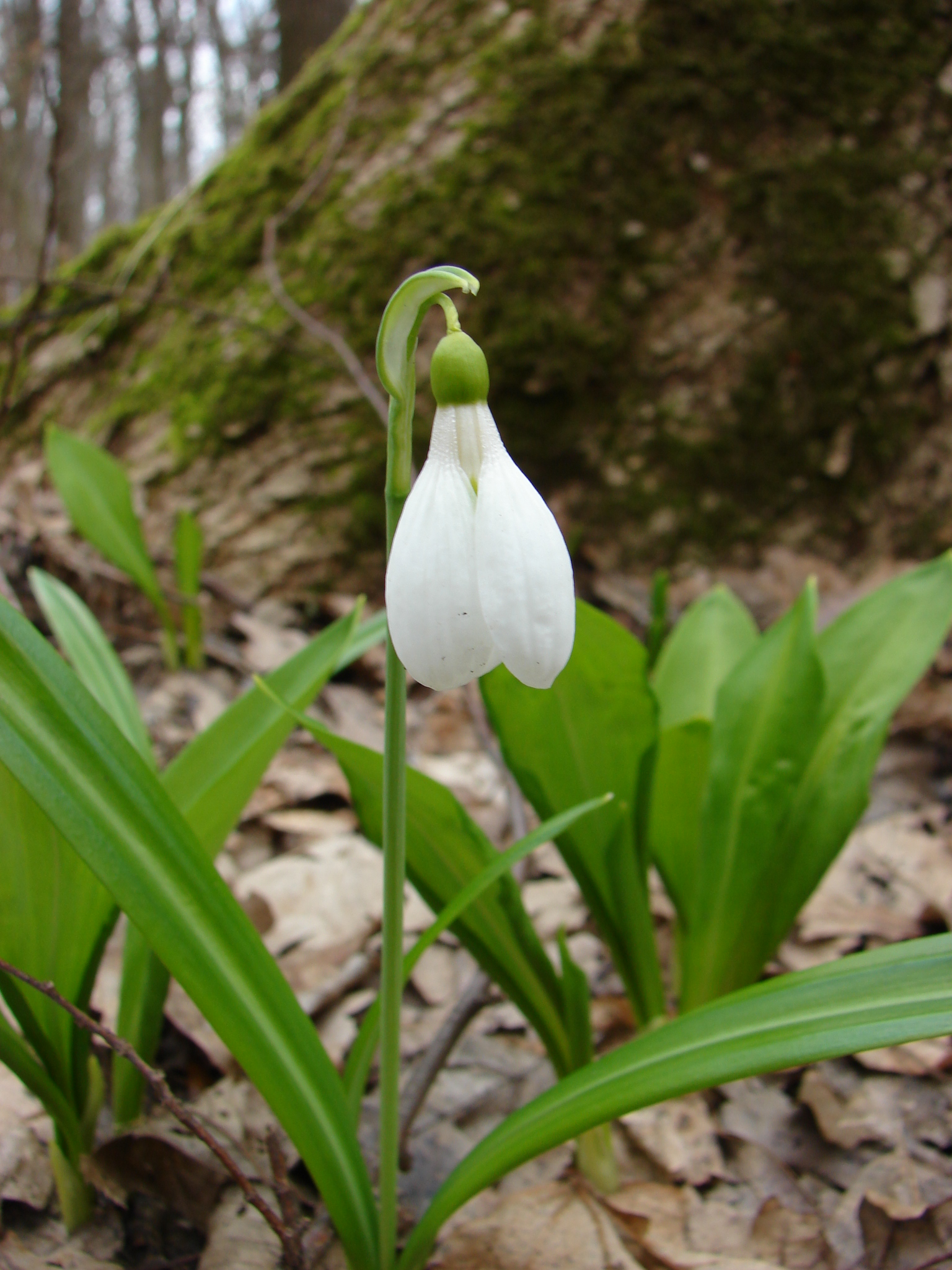
Flower and leaves

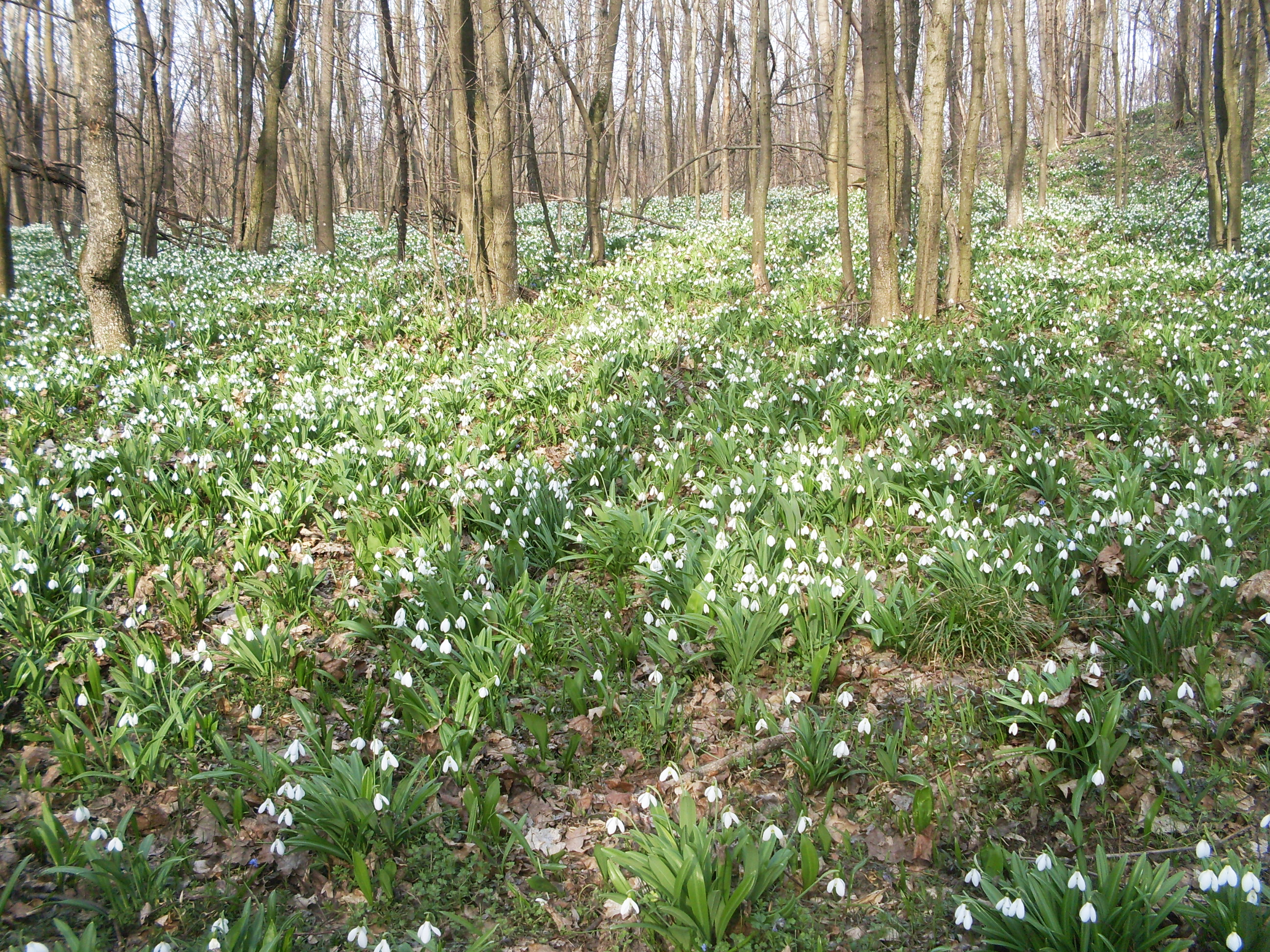
In habitat in Ukraine

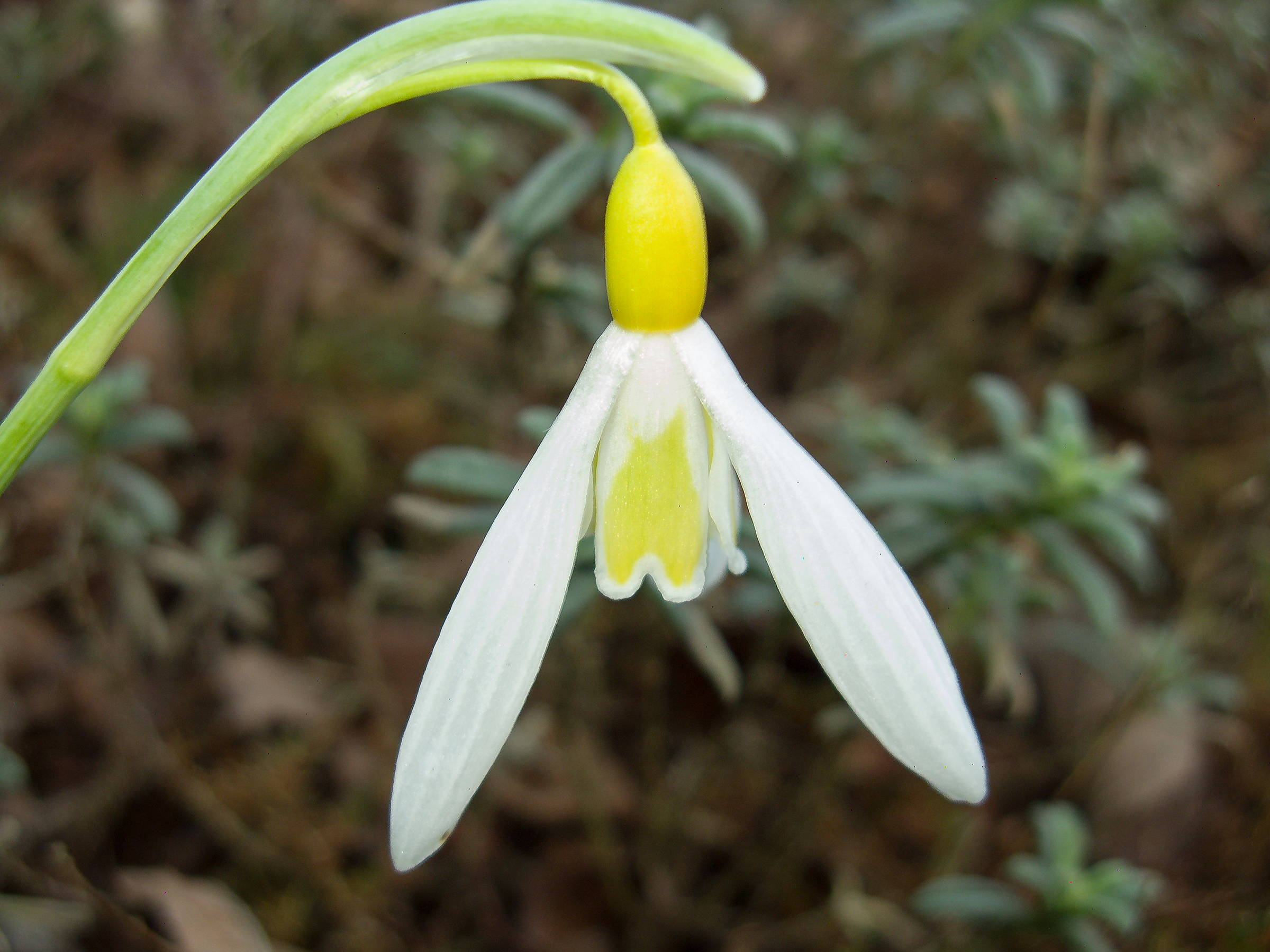
'Wendy's Gold'
