= 1250 Galanthus =

Main-belt asteroid

Discovery
- Discovered by: K. Reinmuth
- Discovery site: Heidelberg Obs.
- Discovery date: 25 January 1933

Designations
- Pronunciation: /ɡəˈlænθəs/
- Named after: Galanthus (snowdrop) (herbaceous plants)
- Alternative designations: 1933 BD · 1971 OQ
- Minor planet category: main-belt · (middle) background

Orbital characteristics
- Epoch 4 September 2017 (JD 2458000.5)
- Uncertainty parameter 0
- Observation arc: 84.84 yr (30,987 days)
- Aphelion: 3.2465 AU
- Perihelion: 1.8560 AU
- Semi-major axis: 2.5513 AU
- Eccentricity: 0.2725
- Orbital period (sidereal): 4.08 yr (1,488 days)
- Mean anomaly: 249.60°
- Mean motion: 0° 14^{m} 30.84^{s} / day
- Inclination: 15.169°
- Longitude of ascending node: 292.02°
- Argument of perihelion: 217.17°

Physical characteristics
- Dimensions: 17.18±5.39 km 19.394±0.152 km 19.54±0.36 km 20.062±0.112 km 20.33±4.93 km 21.00±2.9 km
- Synodic rotation period: 3.918±0.0009 h 3.92 h
- Geometric albedo: 0.04±0.02; 0.0443±0.0069; 0.0500±0.017; 0.055±0.011; 0.058±0.002; 0.06±0.04
- Spectral type: C (assumed)
- Absolute magnitude (H): 12.233±0.001 (R) · 12.26 · 12.52

1250 Galanthus, provisional designation 1933 BD, is a dark background asteroid from the central regions of the asteroid belt, approximately 20 kilometers in diameter. It was discovered on 25 January 1933, by German astronomer Karl Reinmuth at the Heidelberg Observatory. The asteroid was named for the herbaceous plant Galanthus, also known as "snowdrop".

== Orbit and classification ==
Galanthus is a non-family asteroid from the main belt's background population. It orbits the Sun in the central main-belt at a distance of 1.9–3.2 AU once every 4 years and 1 month (1,488 days; semi-major axis of 2.55 AU). Its orbit has an eccentricity of 0.27 and an inclination of 15° with respect to the ecliptic. The body's observation arc begins at Heidelberg the night after its official discovery observation.

== Physical characteristics ==
Galanthus is an assumed carbonaceous C-type asteroid.

=== Rotation period ===
In the early 1980s, a rotational lightcurve of Galanthus was obtained during a survey conducted by Richard P. Binzel at the McDonald Observatory, Texas. Lightcurve analysis gave a well-defined rotation period of 3.92 hours with a brightness variation of 0.28 magnitude (U=3). The period was confirmed from photometric observations by astronomers at the Palomar Transient Factory in October 2015, which gave a similar period of 3.918 hours and an amplitude of 0.22 magnitude (U=2).

=== Diameter and albedo ===
According to the surveys carried out by the Infrared Astronomical Satellite IRAS, the Japanese Akari satellite and the NEOWISE mission of NASA's Wide-field Infrared Survey Explorer, Galanthus measures between 17.18 and 21.00 kilometers in diameter and its surface has an albedo between 0.04 and 0.06.

The Collaborative Asteroid Lightcurve Link adopts the results obtained by IRAS, that is, an albedo of 0.0500 and a diameter of 21.0 kilometers based on an absolute magnitude of 12.26.

== Naming ==
This minor planet was named after the herbaceous plant Galanthus, also known as "snowdrop". The official naming citation was mentioned in The Names of the Minor Planets by Paul Herget in 1955 (H 115).

=== Reinmuth's flowers ===
Due to his many discoveries, Karl Reinmuth submitted a large list of 66 newly named asteroids in the early 1930s. The list covered his discoveries with numbers between (1009) and (1200). This list also contained a sequence of 28 asteroids, starting with 1054 Forsytia, that were all named after plants, in particular flowering plants (also see list of minor planets named after animals and plants).
