= Galanthus bursanus =

- CITES Appendix II (CITES)

Scientific classification
- Kingdom: Plantae
- Clade: Tracheophytes
- Clade: Angiosperms
- Clade: Monocots
- Order: Asparagales
- Family: Amaryllidaceae
- Subfamily: Amaryllidoideae
- Genus: Galanthus
- Species: G. bursanus

Binomial name
- Galanthus bursanus Zubov, Konca & A.P.Davis

Species of flowering plant

Galanthus bursanus is a species of snowdrop described in 2019 from populations in Bursa Province, Northwest Turkey. This flower is classified as endangered due to factors including climate change, illegal collection, and habitat loss from quarrying and the expansion of agriculture.

The species is autumn-flowering, with narrow, glaucous, foliage only partly developed at flowering time.
