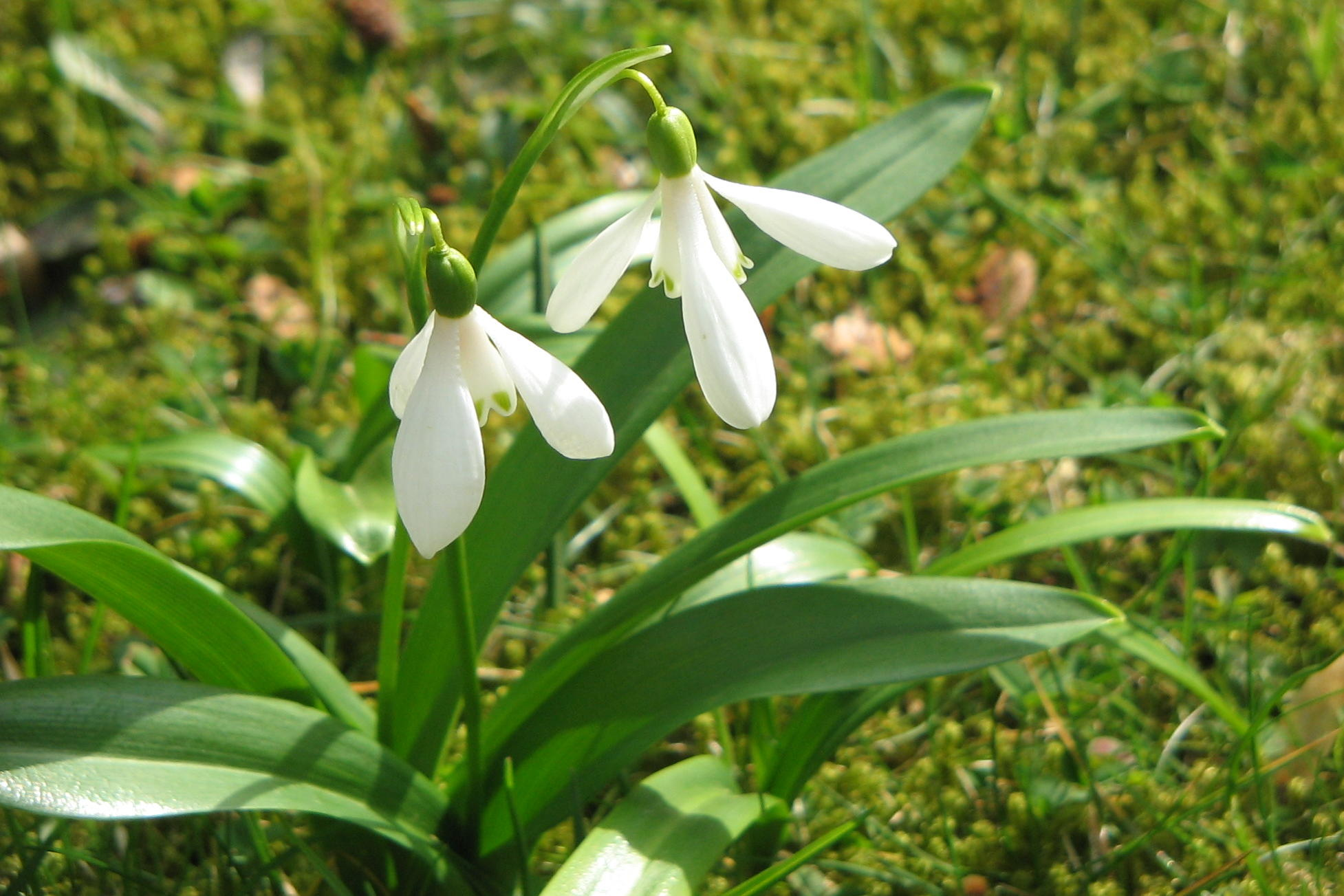
- CITES Appendix II

Scientific classification
- Kingdom: Plantae
- Clade: Embryophytes
- Clade: Tracheophytes
- Clade: Spermatophytes
- Clade: Angiosperms
- Clade: Monocots
- Order: Asparagales
- Family: Amaryllidaceae
- Subfamily: Amaryllidoideae
- Genus: Galanthus
- Species: G. woronowii

Binomial name
- Galanthus woronowii Losinsk.

= Galanthus woronowii =

Species of flowering plant

Galanthus woronowii, the green snowdrop or Woronow's snowdrop, is a bulbous plant native to north-east Turkey and the west and central Caucasus. In cultivation particularly, it has often been confused with two other species with broad green leaves and a single green mark on the inner tepals: Galanthus ikariae and Galanthus platyphyllus (usually under its synonym G. latifolius).

== Description ==
Galanthus woronowii grows from a bulb. The leaves are "supervolute", i.e. one leaf is tightly clasped around the other within the bud, usually remaining like this at the base of the plant as it grows. The leaves are generally 13–25 cm (5–10 in) long, sometimes up to 41 cm (16 in), and around 13–21 mm (0.5–0.8 in) wide, although they may be narrower or wider. The leaf narrows at the base with widest part of the leaf in the upper third. The leaf is light to medium green; the lower surface is somewhat more shiny than the upper. The midrib of the leaf is prominent; there are also often two to four visible fold marks running along the length of the leaf.

The usually solitary flowers are born on a leafless green stem (scape), 4–19 cm (1.6–7.5 in) long. The pedicel (stalk) of the flower is 15–26 mm (0.6–1.0 in) long. The outer three tepals are considerably longer than the inner three, usually about 16–24 mm (0.6–0.9 in) long compared to 7–12 mm (0.3–0.5 in). Since the flower hangs downwards, the apex of the tepals is at the lowest point. The apex of the inner tepals has a "sinus" (i.e. it has a notch in the middle). There is a green mark around the sinus, either U-shaped or split into two parts on either side. The seed capsule is green, more or less spherical with brown seeds about 5 mm (0.2 in) long.

== Taxonomy ==
Galanthus woronowii was first described in 1935 by the Russian botanist Agnia Losina-Losinskaja. The specific epithet commemorates the botanist and plant collector Yury Nikolaevich Voronov.

Particularly in cultivation, it has frequently been confused with two other species, Galanthus platyphyllus (usually under its synonym G. latifolius) and Galanthus ikariae. All three species have broad green leaves arranged in a supervolute pattern (i.e. wrapped round one another at the base), and inner tepals with a green mark only at the apex. The inner tepals of G. platyphyllus lack a sinus at the apex, i.e. they do not have a notched edge. G. ikariae and G. woronowii are similar, although molecular studies have shown that they are distinct species. Some differences are:

- The green mark at the tips of the inner tepals is smaller and less bold in G. woronowii compared to G. ikariae, in which it typically occupies half or more of the area of the tepal.
- The leaves of G. woronowii are bright green; those of G. ikariae are duller, being described as "dark matt-green".
- A transverse section of a leaf shows differences in the air spaces. In G. woronowii the air spaces are small and generally invisible to the naked eye. In G. ikariae there are large air spaces, clearly visible to the naked eye.

== Cultivation ==
Galanthus woronowii has gained the Royal Horticultural Society's Award of Garden Merit.
