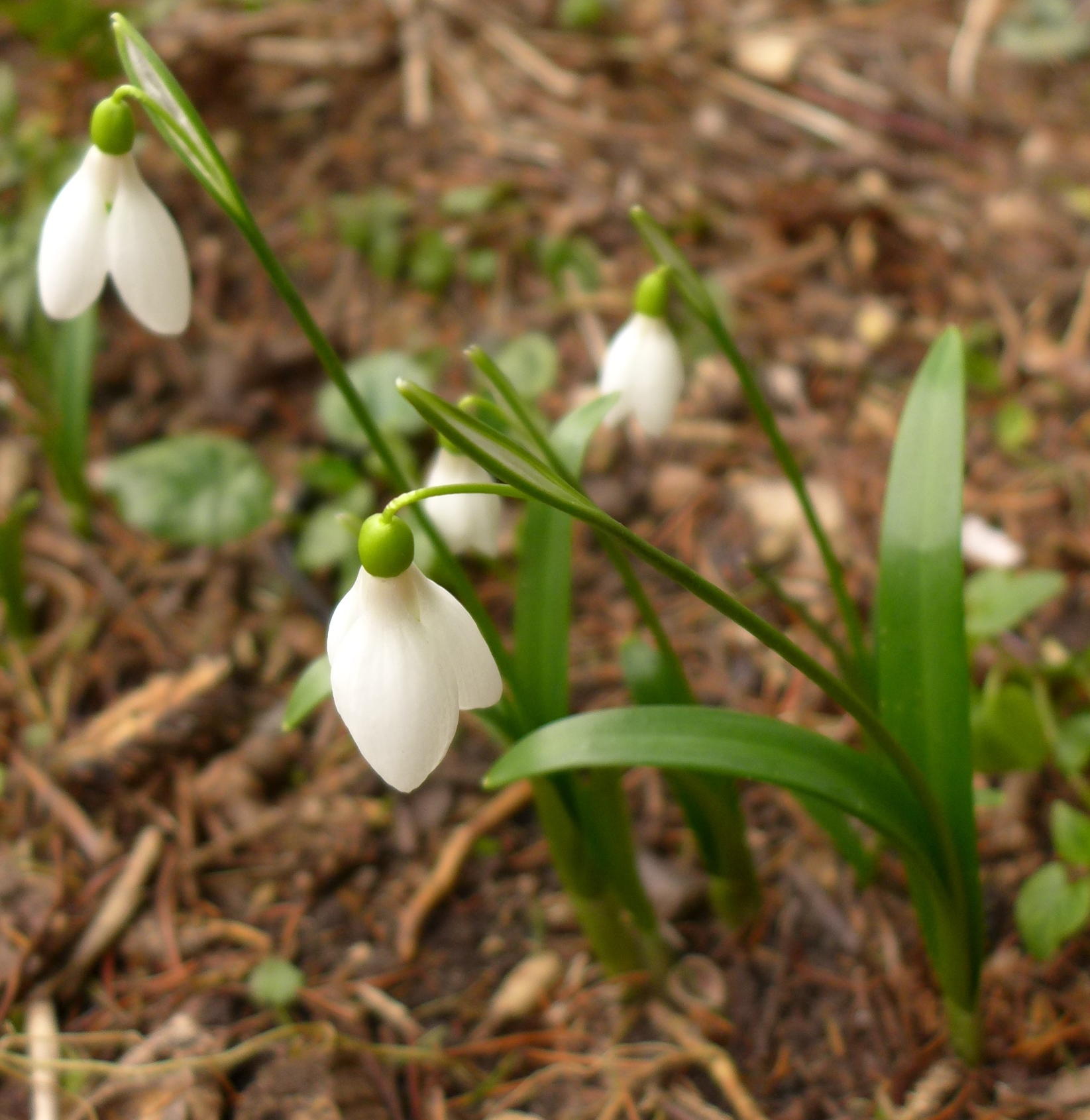
- CITES Appendix II (CITES)

Scientific classification
- Kingdom: Plantae
- Clade: Tracheophytes
- Clade: Angiosperms
- Clade: Monocots
- Order: Asparagales
- Family: Amaryllidaceae
- Subfamily: Amaryllidoideae
- Genus: Galanthus
- Species: G. lagodechianus

Binomial name
- Galanthus lagodechianus Kem.-Nath.

= Galanthus lagodechianus =

Species of flowering plant

Galanthus lagodechianus is a species of snowdrop in the family Amaryllidaceae, native to Armenia, Azerbaijan, east Georgia and the Russian Federation (Kabardino-Balkaria and North Ossetia).

It is a bulbous herbaceous perennial, growing to 10 cm (3.9 in) in leaf and 20 cm (7.9 in) in flower. The erect green leaves appear in early spring, followed by a single, bell-shaped, pendent white inflorescence. The inner perianth segments are marked with a green inverted v-shape.

It prefers moist conditions in sun or partial shade.

Galanthus lagodechianus was described by the Georgian botanist Kemularia-Nathadze in 1947. The specific epithet lagodechianus refers to the Lagodekhi nature reserve in east Georgia. It occurs at 1,800–2,400 m (5,900–7,900 ft) elevation, in mixed deciduous forests. It is also widely cultivated as an ornamental, and is notable for being the latest flowering of all snowdrop species (often at the end of February or the beginning of March).
