= Clinical Neuropharmacology =

- Discipline: Pharmacology
- Language: English
- Edited by: Peter A. LeWitt

Publication details
- History: 1976–present
- Publisher: Lippincott Williams & Wilkins
- Frequency: Bimonthly
- Open access: Yes
- Impact factor: 2.009 (2014)

Standard abbreviations
- ISO 4: Clin. Neuropharmacol.

Indexing
- CODEN: CLNEDB
- ISSN: 0362-5664 (print); 1537-162X (web)
- LCCN: 76644724
- OCLC no.: 2278021

Links
- Journal homepage; Online access

The Clinical Neuropharmacology is a peer-reviewed bimonthly journal publishes original articles, brief reports, reviews devoted to the pharmacology of the nervous system in its broadest sense. According to the Journal Citation Reports, the journal has a 2014 impact factor of 2.009 . The journal ranks 148/254 among Pharmacology & Pharmacy and 116/192 Clinical Neurology.
