= List of snowdrop gardens =

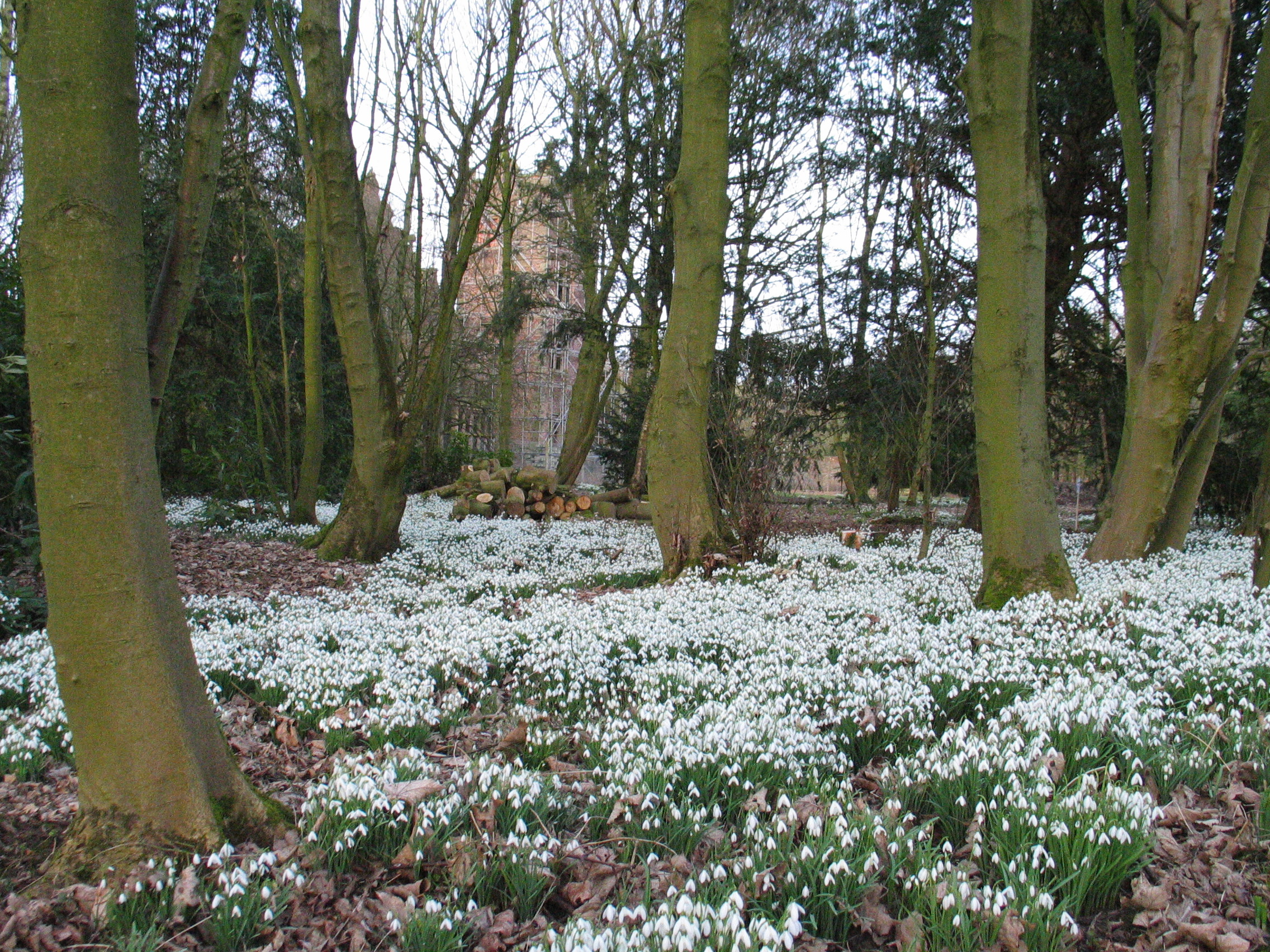
A snowdrop carpet at Bank Hall, Bretheton in February 2009

Snowdrops (species of Galanthus) are popular late winter or early spring flowers which are celebrated as a sign of spring and can attract large numbers of visitors to places where they are growing. The reason for their popularity is that snowdrops can form impressive carpets of white in areas where they are native or have been naturalised. Most 'Snowdrop Gardens' will have the common snowdrop, Galanthus nivalis, but some have more unusual snowdrops, some which may be unique to the garden that they are growing in. The rarest may only survive in that garden due to the conditions and environment.

== Galanthophile ==
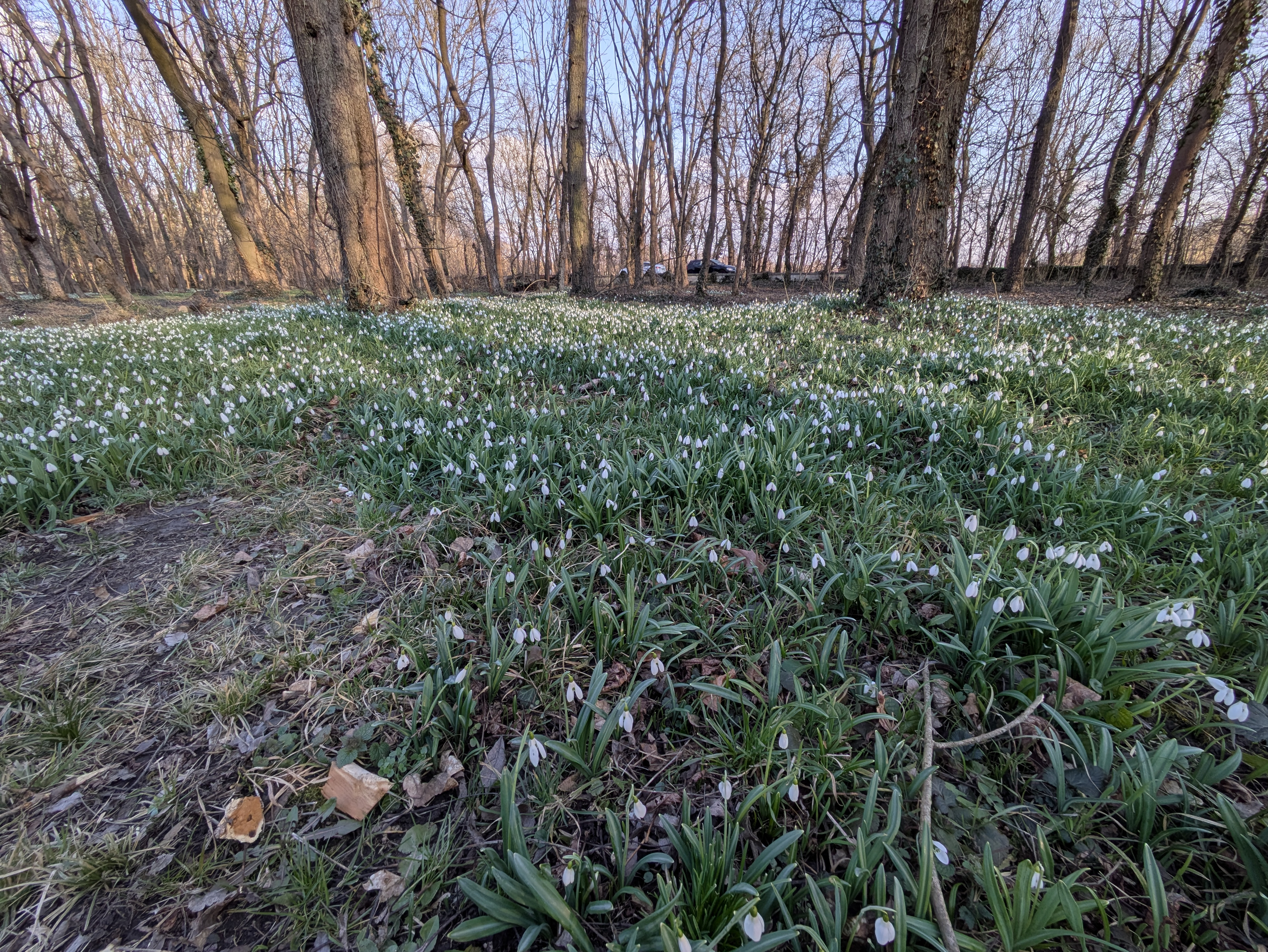
Snowdrop field in Alcsút Gardens

A galanthophile is a snowdrop enthusiast. They may be authors of snowdrop books, cultivate snowdrops, collect snowdrops and have displays of them for personal and public display. Well known galanthophiles are the horticulturalist E. A. Bowles and the nurseryman James Allen. Modern day galanthophiles range from teenagers to the elderly, who continue under the same principles but also visit many of the gardens each year to see the displays of snowdrops as part of their hobby.

The UK-based Cottage Garden Society has a snowdrop group that visits snowdrop gardens every year.

== Notable events ==
There are a number of snowdrop gardens in England, Wales, Scotland, and Ireland. Sixty gardens took part in Scotland's first Snowdrop Festival (1 February – 11 March 2007). Several gardens in England open during snowdrop season for the National Gardens Scheme (NGS).

== England and Wales ==
- Adlington Hall & Gardens, Cheshire
- Anglesey Abbey, Lode, Cambridgeshire
- Bank Hall, Bretherton, Lancashire
- Benington Lordship, Hertfordshire
- Brandy Mount, New Alresford, Hampshire (NCCPG National Plant Collection of Snowdrops) (NGS)
- Calke Abbey, Ticknall, Derbyshire
- Chelsea Physic Garden, has over 120 varieties which bloom especially early due to the garden's warmth
- Chippenham Park, Newmarket, Cambridge, Cambridgeshire.
- Colesbourne Park, Gloucestershire
- East Lambrook Manor, Somerset (NGS)
- Easton Lodge, near Little Easton, Essex
- Easton Walled Gardens, near Grantham, Lincolnshire
- Felley Priory, Nottinghamshire
- The Garden House, Dartmoor, Devon - over 350 varieties. Snowdrop festival every February. http://www.thegardenhouse.org.uk
- Goldsborough Hall, Goldsborough, near Knaresborough, North Yorkshire
- Hopton Hall, Hopton, Derbyshire
- Hodsock Priory, Nottinghamshire
- Ickworth House, Park and Gardens, Horringer, Bury St Edmunds, Suffolk
- Kingston Lacy, Dorset
- Moggerhanger House, Bedfordshire
- Ness Botanic Gardens, Merseyside
- Painswick Rococo Gardens, Gloucestershire
- Rode Hall & Gardens, Cheshire
- Rodmarton Manor, Gloucestershire
- Walsingham, Norfolk
- Welford Park, Newbury, Berkshire
- Wye Valley Sculpture Garden, Tintern, Monmouthshire

== Scotland ==
- Lawton House, Arbroath, Angus
- Cambo Estate, Fife
- Danevale Park, Crossmichael, Dumfries
- Finlaystone, Renfrewshire
- Gagie House, Dundee

== Ireland ==
- Mark Smyth's Garden, Antrim
- Primrose Hill, Lucan, County Dublin,
- Altamont Garden, Tullow, County Carlow

== Hungary ==
- Alcsút Palace, Fejér county – 2.5 hectare large snowdrop field with six Mediterranean species, probably established in the 19th century by the Habsburg family
