= Margery Fish =

Garden writer and horticulturalist

- Born: Margery Townshend; 1892; Eastbank, Stamford Hill
- Died: 1969 (aged 76–77); South Petherton Hospital, Somerset
- Occupations: gardener and writer

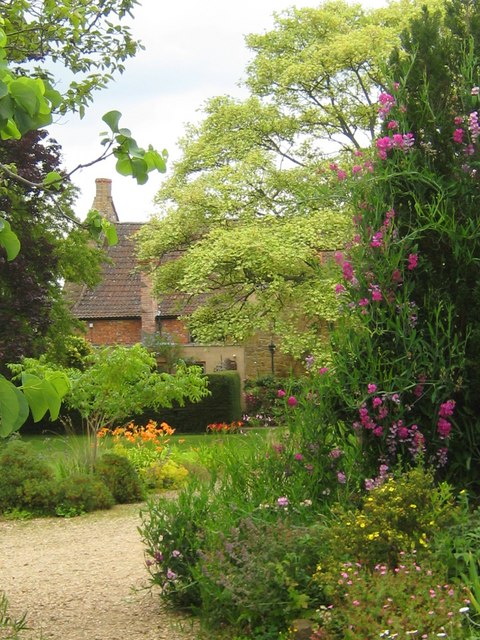
The garden of Margery Fish, East Lambrook

Margery Fish (née Townshend) (5 August 1892 – 24 March 1969) was an English gardener and gardening writer, who exercised a strong influence on the informal English cottage garden style of her period. The garden she created, at East Lambrook Manor in Somerset, has Grade I listed status and remains open to the public.

== Background ==
Margery Townshend was born on 5 August 1892 at 16 Eastbank, Stamford Hill, now part of the London Borough of Hackney, as the second of the four daughters of Ernest Townshend (died 1926), a commercial traveller in tea, and his wife Florence Harriet, née Buttfield (died 1920).

She was educated at the Friends School Saffron Walden and at a secretarial college, before spending twenty years working in Fleet Street, initially with countryside magazines and then with Associated Newspapers. There she accompanied Lord Northcliffe on a war mission to the United States in 1916, and then worked as secretary to six successive editors of the Daily Mail, the last of whom, the widower Walter Fish, she married on 2 March 1933, three years after his retirement. During and after her period with Associated Newspapers she wrote for several other papers and periodicals, including the field-sports magazine The Field.

A visit to Germany in 1937 convinced Walter Fish that war was inevitable and that they should move to the countryside. They eventually bought East Lambrook Manor in the Somerset parish of Kingsbury Episcopi in November of that year. The house, which was designated a Grade II* listed building in 1959, was built of Somerset hamstone in the 15th and 16th centuries and came with two acres of land.

== Gardening ==
Margery Fish was a novice at gardening, but she knew that she wanted an informal garden using cottage garden flowers, while allowing also for self-spreading and self-seeding of native plants. There was to be floral interest appearing all the year round. Her husband, on the other hand, preferred a more formal style with extravagant displays of summer flowers. The battle of wills between them was described in the first of her gardening books, We Made a Garden (1956), which is as much about a difficult marriage as about the difficulties of starting a garden from scratch.

Only after Walter's death in 1947 could Margery fully implement her ideas and develop her skills as a plantswoman. She became interested especially in unfashionable green hellebores and other shade-loving spring flowers. She sought to make things grow in cracks and crevices. She soon had a group of correspondents, with whom she swapped ideas and rare plant material. These included Lawrence Johnston of Hidcote Manor, Gloucestershire, the garden designer Nancy Lindsay, and the Somerset neighbour Violet Clive of Brympton d'Evercy, an equally passionate gardener. By the late 1950s, East Lambrook garden was being opened to the public for charity and had a small plant nursery attached to it. In 1963, she received a silver Veitch Memorial Medal from the Royal Horticultural Society.

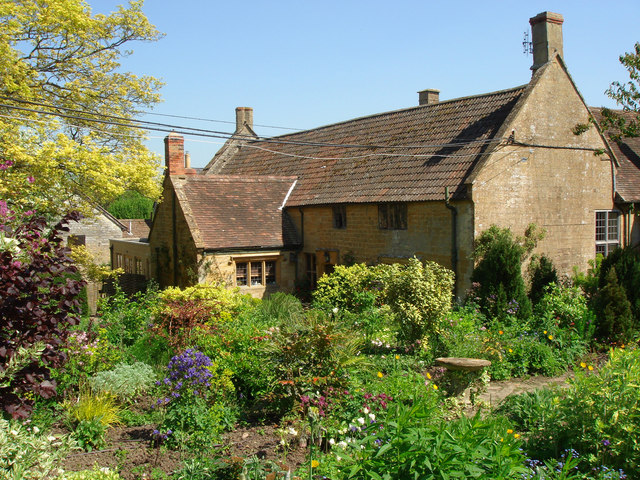
East Lambrook Manor and garden in 2007

As the garden website put it, "Margery Fish developed a style of gardening which was in tune with the times: the Second World War had made labour scarce and expensive and it was no longer a reality to have paid teams of gardeners. Gardens had to change. While the cottage garden style was already apparent at Hidcote and Sissinghurst, these were gardens that still required paid gardeners. What Mrs Fish created at East Lambrook Manor, was a grand cottage garden on a domestic scale." The garden was awarded Grade I status by English Heritage in 1992.

For many years, Fish used minimal gardening assistance. She divided her time between writing and maintaining the garden, including tasks such as dry stone walling and path construction. The garden included different sections, including a dry, sun-exposed area and a shaded, damp area that utilized a stream running behind an old malthouse. The plant Artemisia absinthium ("Lambrook Silver") is cultivated in the garden.

Other varieties named after her garden include the spurge Euphorbia characias ssp. wulfenii 'Lambrook Gold', the cotton lavender Santolina chamaecyparissus 'Lambrook Silver', and the primrose Primula 'Lambrook Mauve'. She hunted out several rare old double forms and single and named coloured forms of primrose. There are varieties of Pulmonaria, Penstemon, Bergenia, Dicentra, Hebe, Euphorbia characias and Hemerocallis named after her. She is credited with aptly naming the variety Astrantia major subsp involucrata 'Shaggy' on discovering it in her garden.

Margery Fish became an avid galanthophile or snowdrop enthusiast. Her book A Flower for Every Day includes an account of the giant snowdrop variety "S. Arnott", first exhibited at a Royal Horticultural Society exhibition in 1951 and acquired by her from a specialist company. There were said in 2008 still to be 60 different named varieties of Galanthus nivalis growing at East Lambrook. Several snowdrop varieties discovered in the "ditch garden" at Lambrook since Margery Fish's death have been named and described.

== Writing ==
Apart from writing eight books of her own, Margery Fish contributed to the Oxford Book of Garden Flowers (1963) and The Shell Gardens Book (1964), and wrote a regular column in the 1950s and 1960s for Amateur Gardening and then Popular Gardening. She also made regular broadcasting appearances and gave lectures. A database compiled in the 1990s of every plant she mentioned in print contains 6500 items, including over 200 single snowdrop varieties. Michael Pollan, reviewing a belated 1996 first US edition of We Made a Garden, called Fish "the most congenial of garden writers, possessed of a modest and deceptively simple voice that manages to delicately layer memoir with horticultural how-to."

== Legacy ==
Margery Fish died in South Petherton Hospital, Somerset, on 24 March 1969, leaving her house and garden to a nephew, Henry Boyd-Carpenter. He and other relatives kept up the garden and extended the nursery. They were sold in 1985, but the next owners, Andrew and Dodo Norton, maintained the garden and nursery and continued to develop the legacy of Margery Fish, before handing over to the Williams family in 1999.

However, according to David St John Thomas writing in 2004, "It was a miracle that [the garden] survived unscathed." Robert and Mary Anne Williams bought it after visiting the house in the dark and had no inkling of the garden's importance, with its two long standing gardeners, or knowledge of Margaret Fish. However, Robert completed a Royal Horticultural College course, and they were soon employing 28 staff, with a tearoom, shop and art gallery.

The next owners, Gail and Mike Werkmeister, took over in 2008. Under their tenure the garden remained open to the public regularly and some Royal Horticultural Society and Yeovil College horticulture courses were held there. The house and garden were sold again in 2025 to Andrew and Alison Johnson and will remain open to the public.

== Books ==
- We Made a Garden, 1956
- A Flower for Every Day, 1958
- Cottage Garden Flowers, 1961
- Ground Cover Plants, 1963
- Gardening in the Shade, 1964
- An All the Year Garden, 1966
- Carefree Gardening, 1966
- Gardening on Clay and Lime, 1970

All the titles have been reprinted in various forms at various times. Several have been translated into German, Dutch, Italian and other languages.

== External resources ==
- East Lambrook Manor Gardens website. Retrieved 20 December 2016.
- A tribute by garden designer Sarah Topp. Retrieved 2 November 2012.
- A recent US appreciation of East Lambrook and Margery Fish. Retrieved 2 November 2012.
- A well illustrated account of a visit to the garden. Retrieved 2 November 2012.
- The National Portrait Gallery, London possesses two photographs of Margery Fish: Retrieved 2 November 2012.
- A 2007 BBC radio programme on Margery Fish. Retrieved 17 November 2012.
