= Henry Boyd-Carpenter =

English lawyer

Sir (Marsom) Henry Boyd-Carpenter KCVO (born 11 October 1939) is a son of Francis Henry Boyd-Carpenter by his wife Nina (née Townshend). Nina Boyd-Carpenter's sister was the gardener and writer Margery Fish; Henry Boyd-Carpenter inherited his aunt's house and garden at East Lambrook Manor in Somerset, selling it in 1985.

He was educated at Charterhouse and Balliol College, Oxford (BA 1962; MA 1967) before being admitted a solicitor in 1966.

In 1971 he married Lesley Ann Davies; they have a son, William, and a daughter, Alexandra Boyd-Carpenter. Sir Henry and Lady Boyd-Carpenter now live near Monmouth.

Boyd-Carpenter was Solicitor to the Duchy of Cornwall from 1974–94 and a Partner (later Managing Partner) of Farrer & Co, Solicitors from 1968. He served as Private Solicitor to HM The Queen from 1995 until 2002.

He was appointed CVO in 1994 before being knighted in 2004, as too was his great grandfather William Boyd Carpenter (KCVO), Bishop of Ripon from 1884 to 1911 and court chaplain to Queen Victoria.

Boyd-Carpenter's other memberships include: Law Society of England and Wales (1966); Council of The Prince of Wales's Institute of Architecture (1995); Board of the British Library (1999); Honorary Steward Westminster Abbey (1980); Hon. Legal Advisor to the Canterbury Cathedral Trust Fund (1994); Member of the Governing Body Charterhouse (1981); Governor Sutton’s Hospital in Charterhouse (1994); St Mary’s School, Gerrards Cross (1967–1970); Council of Chelsea Physic Garden (1983); Trustee National Gardens Scheme (1998); and Merlin Trust (1998).
