= Cottage garden =

Distinct style of garden

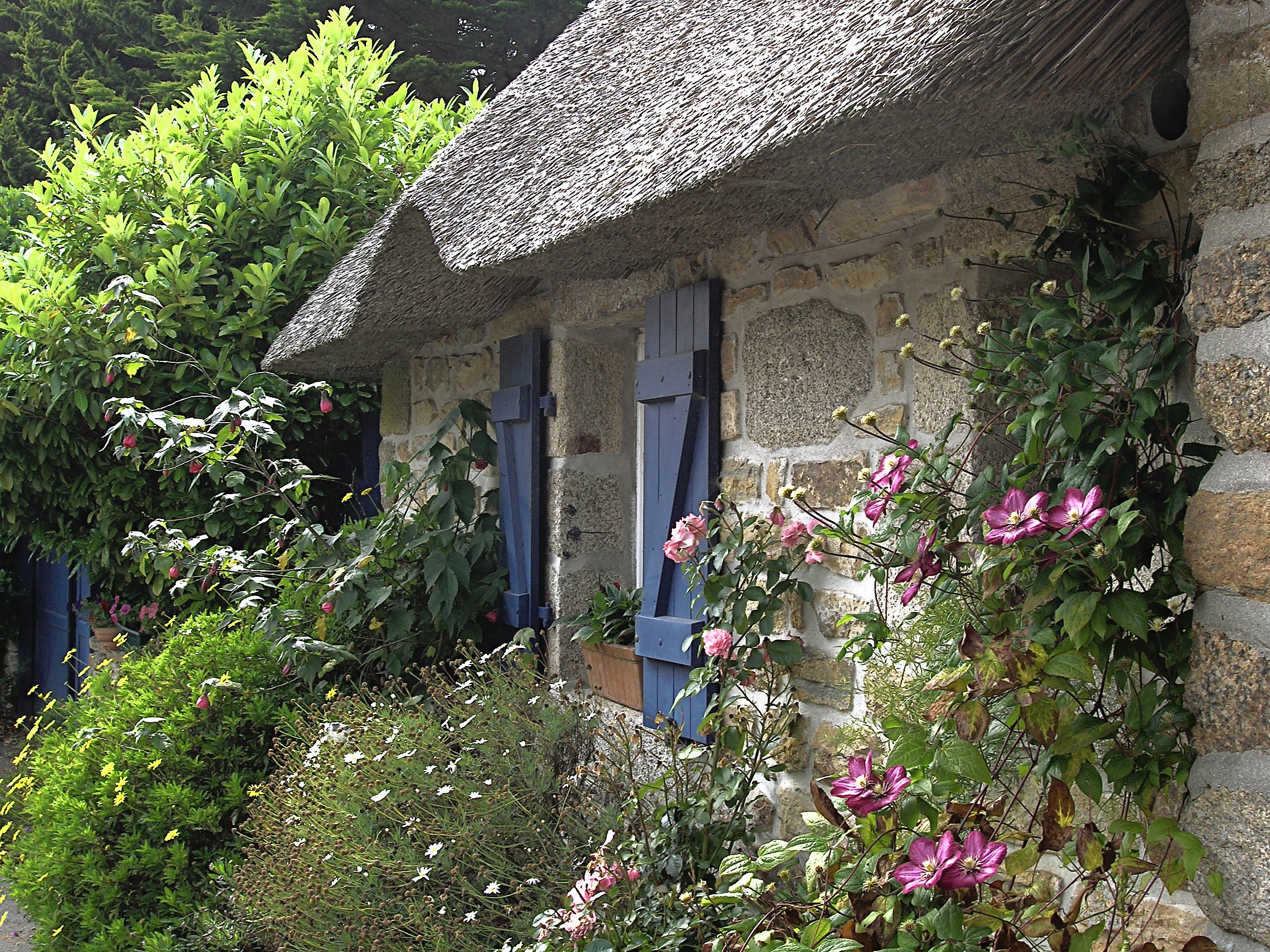
Roses, clematis, a thatched roof: a cottage garden in Brittany.

The cottage garden is a distinct garden style that uses informal design, traditional materials, dense plantings, and a mixture of ornamental and edible plants. English in origin, it depends on grace and charm rather than grandeur and formal structure. Homely and functional gardens connected to cottages go back centuries, but their stylized reinvention occurred in 1870s England as a reaction to the more structured, rigorously maintained estate gardens with their formal designs and mass plantings of greenhouse annuals.

The earliest cottage gardens were more practical than today's, with emphasis on vegetables and herbs, fruit trees, perhaps a beehive, and even livestock. Flowers, used to fill spaces, gradually became more dominant. The traditional cottage garden was usually enclosed, perhaps with a rose-bowered gateway. Flowers common to early cottage gardens included traditional florists' flowers such as primroses and violets, along with flowers with household use such as calendula and various herbs. Others were the richly scented old-fashioned roses that bloomed once a year, and simple flowers like daisies. In time, cottage-garden sections were added to some large estate gardens as well.

Modern cottage gardens include countless regional and personal variations and embrace plant materials, such as ornamental grasses or native plants not seen in the rural gardens of cottagers. Traditional roses, with their full fragrance and lush foliage, continue to be a cottage-garden mainstay - along with modern disease-resistant varieties that retain traditional attributes. Informal climbing plants, whether traditional or modern hybrids, are also common, as are the self-sowing annuals and freely spreading perennials favoured in traditional cottagers' gardens.

== History ==
=== Origins ===
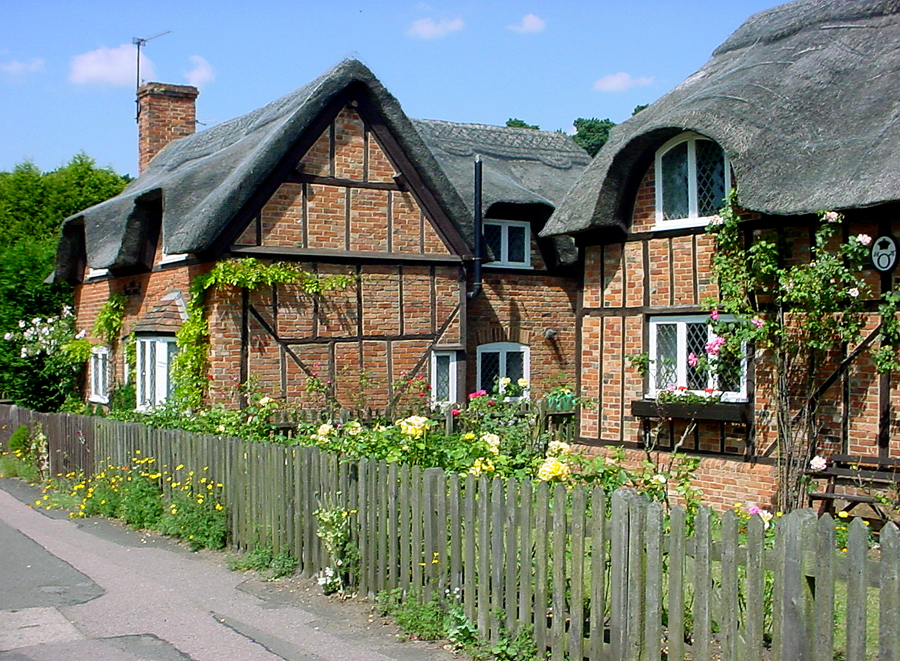
Vernacular thatched cottages (built in 1812–1816) in Woburn Street, Ampthill, Bedfordshire, surrounded by garden.

Cottage gardens, which emerged in Elizabethan times, appear to have originated as a local source for herbs and fruits. One theory is that they arose out of the Black Death of the 1340s, when the death of so many laborers made land available for small cottages with personal gardens. According to the late 19th-century legend of origin, these gardens were originally created by the workers that lived in the cottages of the villages, to provide them with food and herbs, with flowers planted in for decoration. Helen Leach analysed the historical origins of the romanticised cottage garden, subjecting the garden style to rigorous historical analysis, along with the ornamental potager and the herb garden. She concluded that their origins were less in workingmen's gardens in the 19th century and more in the leisured classes' discovery of simple hardy plants, in part through the writings of John Claudius Loudon. Loudon helped to design the estate at Great Tew, Oxfordshire, where farm workers were provided with cottages that had architectural quality set in a smallholding or large garden—about an acre—where they could grow food and keep pigs and chickens.

Authentic gardens of the yeoman cottager would have included a beehive and livestock, and frequently a pig and sty, along with a well. The peasant cottager of medieval times was more interested in meat than flowers, with herbs grown for medicinal use and cooking, rather than for their beauty. By Elizabethan times there was more prosperity, and thus more room to grow flowers. Even the early cottage garden flowers typically had their practical use—violets were spread on the floor (for their pleasant scent and keeping out vermin); calendulas and primroses were both attractive and used in cooking. Others, such as sweet william and hollyhocks, were grown entirely for their beauty.

=== Development ===
The "naturalness" of informal design began to be noticed and developed by the British leisured class. Alexander Pope was an early proponent of less formal gardens, calling in a 1713 article for gardens with the "amiable simplicity of unadorned nature". Other writers in the 18th century who encouraged less formal, and more natural, gardens included Joseph Addison and Lord Shaftesbury. The evolution of cottage gardens can be followed in the issues of The Cottage Gardener (1848–61), edited by George William Johnson, where the emphasis is squarely on the "florist's flowers", carnations and auriculas in fancy varieties that were originally cultivated as a highly competitive blue-collar hobby.

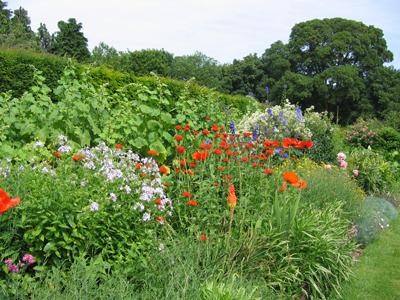
Restored Gertrude Jekyll border at Manor House, Upton Grey, Hampshire

William Robinson and Gertrude Jekyll helped to popularise less formal gardens in their many books and magazine articles. Robinson's The Wild Garden, published in 1870, contained in the first edition an essay on "The Garden of British Wild Flowers", which was eliminated from later editions. In his The English Flower Garden, illustrated with cottage gardens from Somerset, Kent and Surrey, he remarked, "One lesson of these little gardens, that are so pretty, is that one can get good effects from simple materials." From the 1890s his lifelong friend Jekyll applied cottage garden principles to more structured designs in even quite large country houses. Her Colour in the Flower Garden (1908) is still in print today.

Robinson and Jekyll were part of the Arts and Crafts Movement, a broader movement in art, architecture, and crafts during the late 19th century which advocated a return to the informal planting style derived as much from the Romantic tradition as from the actual English cottage garden. The Arts and Crafts Exhibition of 1888 began a movement toward an idealised natural country garden style. The garden designs of Robinson and Jekyll were often associated with Arts and Crafts style houses. Both were influenced by William Morris, one of the leaders of the Arts and Crafts Movement—Robinson quoted Morris's views condemning carpet bedding; Jekyll shared Morris's mystical view of nature and drew on the floral designs in his textiles for her gardening style. When Morris built his Red House in Kent, it influenced new ideas in architecture and gardening—the "old-fashioned" garden suddenly became a fashion accessory among the British artistic middle class, and the cottage garden esthetic began to emigrate to America.

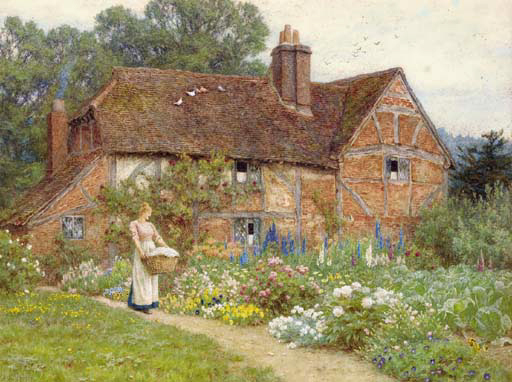
Helen Allingham watercolor showing elite peonies and modern delphiniums in an idealised cottage garden, 1909

In the early 20th century the term "cottage garden" might be applied even to as large and sophisticated a garden as Hidcote Manor, which Vita Sackville-West described as "a cottage garden on the most glorified scale" but where the colour harmonies were carefully contrived and controlled, as in the famous "Red Borders". Sackville-West had taken similar models for her own "cottage garden", one of many "garden rooms" at Sissinghurst Castle—her idea of a cottage garden was a place where "the plants grow in a jumble, flowering shrubs mingled with Roses, herbaceous plants with bulbous subjects, climbers scrambling over hedges, seedlings coming up wherever they have chosen to sow themselves". The cottage garden ideal was also spread by artists such as water-colourist Helen Allingham (1848–1926). Another influence was Margery Fish (1892–1969), whose garden survives at East Lambrook Manor.

The cottage garden in France is a development of the early 20th century. Monet's garden at Giverny is a prominent example, a sprawling garden full of varied plantings, rich colors, and water gardens. In modern times, the term 'cottage garden' is used to describe any number of informal garden styles, using design and plants very different from their traditional English cottage garden origins. Examples include regional variations using a grass prairie scheme (in the American midwest) and California chaparral cottage gardens.

== Design ==
While the classic cottage garden is built around a cottage, many cottage-style gardens are created around houses and even estates such as Hidcote Manor, with its more intimate "garden rooms". The cottage garden design is based more on principles than formulae: it has an informal look, with a seemingly casual mixture of flowers, herbs, and vegetables often packed into a small area. In spite of their appearances, cottage gardens have a design and formality that help give them their grace and charm. Due to space limitations, they are often in small rectangular plots, with practical functioning paths and hedges or fences. The plants, layout, and materials are chosen to give the impression of casualness and a country feel. Modern cottage gardens frequently use local flowers and materials, rather than those of the traditional cottage garden. What they share with the tradition is the unstudied look, the use of every square inch, and a rich variety of flowers, herbs, and vegetables.

The cottage garden is designed to appear artless, rather than contrived or pretentious. Instead of artistic curves, or grand geometry, there is an artfully designed irregularity. Borders can go right up to the house, lawns are replaced with tufts of grass or flowers, and beds can be as wide as needed. Instead of the discipline of large scale color schemes, there is the simplicity of harmonious color combinations between neighbouring plants. The overall appearance can be of "a vegetable garden that has been taken over by flowers." The method of planting closely packed plants was supposed to reduce the amount of weeding and watering required. But some features, such as planted stone paths, turf pathways, or clipped hedges overgrown with wayward vines, still need well-timed maintenance.

=== Materials ===
Paths, arbors, and fences use traditional or antique looking materials. Wooden fences and gates, paths covered with locally made bricks or stone, and arbors using natural materials all give a more casual and less formal look and feel to a cottage garden. Pots, ornaments, and furniture also use natural looking materials with traditional finishes. Everything is chosen to give the impression of an old-fashioned country garden.

== Plants ==
=== Overview ===
Until the late 19th century, cottage gardens mainly grew vegetables for household consumption. Typically half the garden would be used for cultivating potatoes and half for a mix of other vegetables plus some culinary and medicinal herbs. John Claudius Loudon wrote extensively on cottage gardens in his book An Encyclopædia of Gardening (1822) and in Gardener's Magazine from 1826. In 1838 he wrote "I seldom observe any thing in a cottage garden but potatoes, cabbages, beans, and French beans; in a few instances onions and parsneps, and very seldom a few peas". An 1865 issue of The Farmer's Magazine noted that in "Ireland and much of the Highlands of Scotland, potatoes are the only thing grown in the cottage-garden".

Modern cottage garden plants are typically flowers chosen for their old-fashioned and informal appeal. Many modern day gardeners use heirloom or 'old-fashioned' plants and varieties, even though these may not have been authentic or traditional cottage garden plants. In addition, there are modern varieties of flowers that fit into the cottage garden look. For example, modern roses developed by David Austin have been chosen for cottage gardens because of their old-fashioned look (multi-petaled form and rosette-shaped flowers) and fragrance—combined with modern virtues of hardiness, repeat blooming, and disease-resistance. Modern cottage gardens often use native plants and those adapted to the local climate, rather than trying to force traditional English plants to grow in an incompatible environment—though many of the old favorites thrive in cottage gardens throughout the world.

=== Roses ===
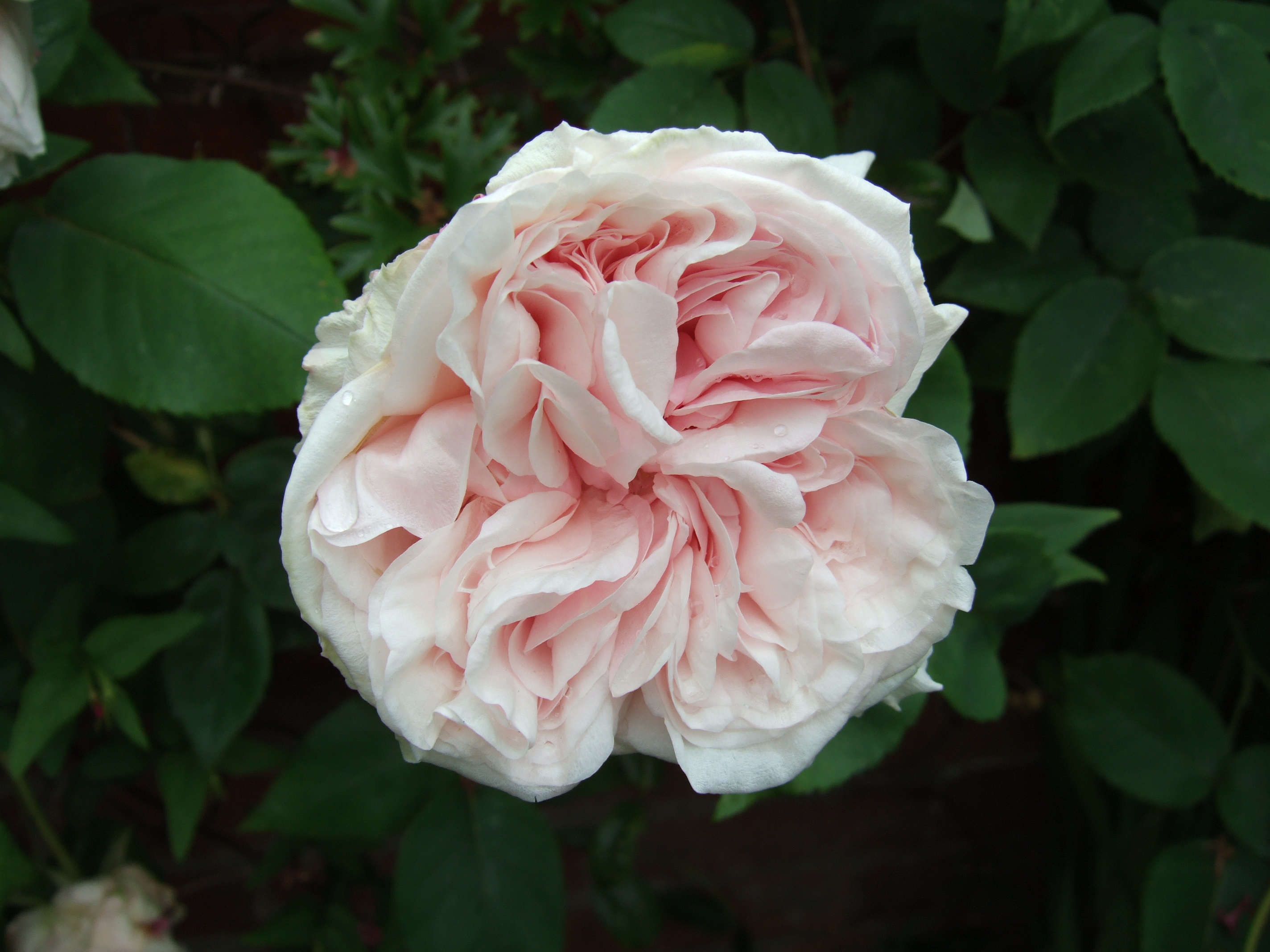
A climbing sport of the elite 'Souvenir de la Malmaison', introduced before 1893, typical of a modern cottage garden.

Cottage gardens are always associated with roses: shrub roses, climbing roses, and old garden roses with lush foliage, in contrast to the gangly modern hybrid tea roses. Old cottage garden roses include cultivated forms of Rosa gallica, which form dense mounded shrubs 3 to 4 feet high and wide, with pale pink to purple flowers—with single form to full double form blooms. They are also very fragrant, and include the ancient Apothecary's rose (R. gallica 'Officinalis'), whose magenta flowers were preserved solely for their fragrance. Another old fragrant cottage garden rose is the Damask rose, which is still grown in Europe for use in perfumes. Cultivated forms of this grow 4 to 6 feet or higher, with gently arching canes that help give an informal look to a garden. Even taller generally are the Alba roses, which are not always white, and which bloom well even in partial shade.

The Provence rose or Rosa centifolia is the full and fat "cabbage rose" made famous by Dutch masters in their 17th-century paintings. These very fragrant shrub roses grow 5 feet tall and wide, with a floppy habit that is aided by training on an arch or pillar. The centifolia roses have produced many descendants that are also cottage garden favorites, including varieties of moss rose (roses with attractive 'mossy' growth on their flower stalks and flower buds). Unlike most modern hybrids, the older roses bloom on the previous year's wood, so they aren't pruned back severely each year. Also as they don't bloom continuously, they can share their branches with later-flowering climbers such as Clematis vines, which use the rose branches for support. A rose in the cottage garden is not segregated with other roses, with bare earth or mulch underneath', but is casually blended with other flowers, vines, and groundcover.

With the introduction of China roses (derived from Rosa chinensis) late in the 18th century, many hybrids were introduced that had the remontant (repeat-blooming) nature of the China roses, but maintained the informal old rose shape and flower. These included the Bourbon rose and the Noisette rose, which were added to the rose repertoire of the cottage garden, and, more recently, hybrid "English" roses introduced by David Austin.

=== Climbing plants ===
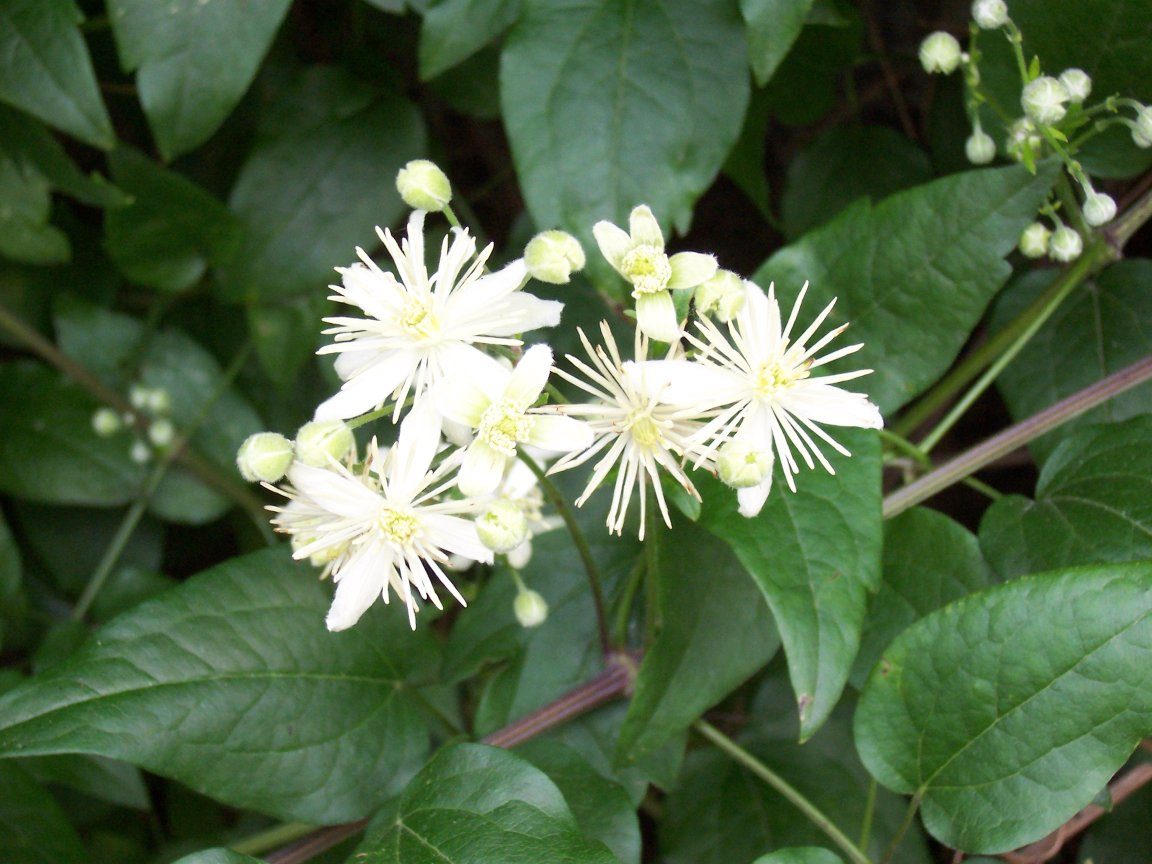
Clematis vitalba

Many of the old roses had cultivars that grew very long canes, which could be tied to trellises or against walls. These older varieties are called "ramblers", rather than "climbers". Climbing plants in the traditional cottage garden included European honeysuckle (Lonicera periclymenum) and Traveller's Joy (Clematis vitalba). The modern cottage garden includes many Clematis hybrids that have the old appeal, with sparse foliage that allows them to grow through roses and trees, and along fences and arbors. There are also many Clematis species used in the modern cottage garden, including Clematis armandii, Clematis chrysocoma, and Clematis flammula. Popular honeysuckles for cottage gardens include Japanese honeysuckle and Lonicera tragophylla.

=== Hedging plants ===
In the traditional cottage garden, hedges served as fences on the perimeter to keep out marauding livestock and for privacy, along with other practical uses. Hawthorn leaves made a tasty snack or tea, while the flowers were used for making wine. The fast-growing Elderberry, in addition to creating a hedge, provided berries for food and wine, with the flowers being fried in batter or made into lotions and ointments. The wood had many uses, including toys, pegs, skewers, and fishing poles. Holly was another hedge plant, useful because it quickly spread and self-seeded. Privet was also a convenient and fast-growing hedge. Over time, more ornamental and less utilitarian plants became popular cottage garden hedges, including laurel, lilac, snowberry, japonica, and others.

=== Flowers and herbs ===
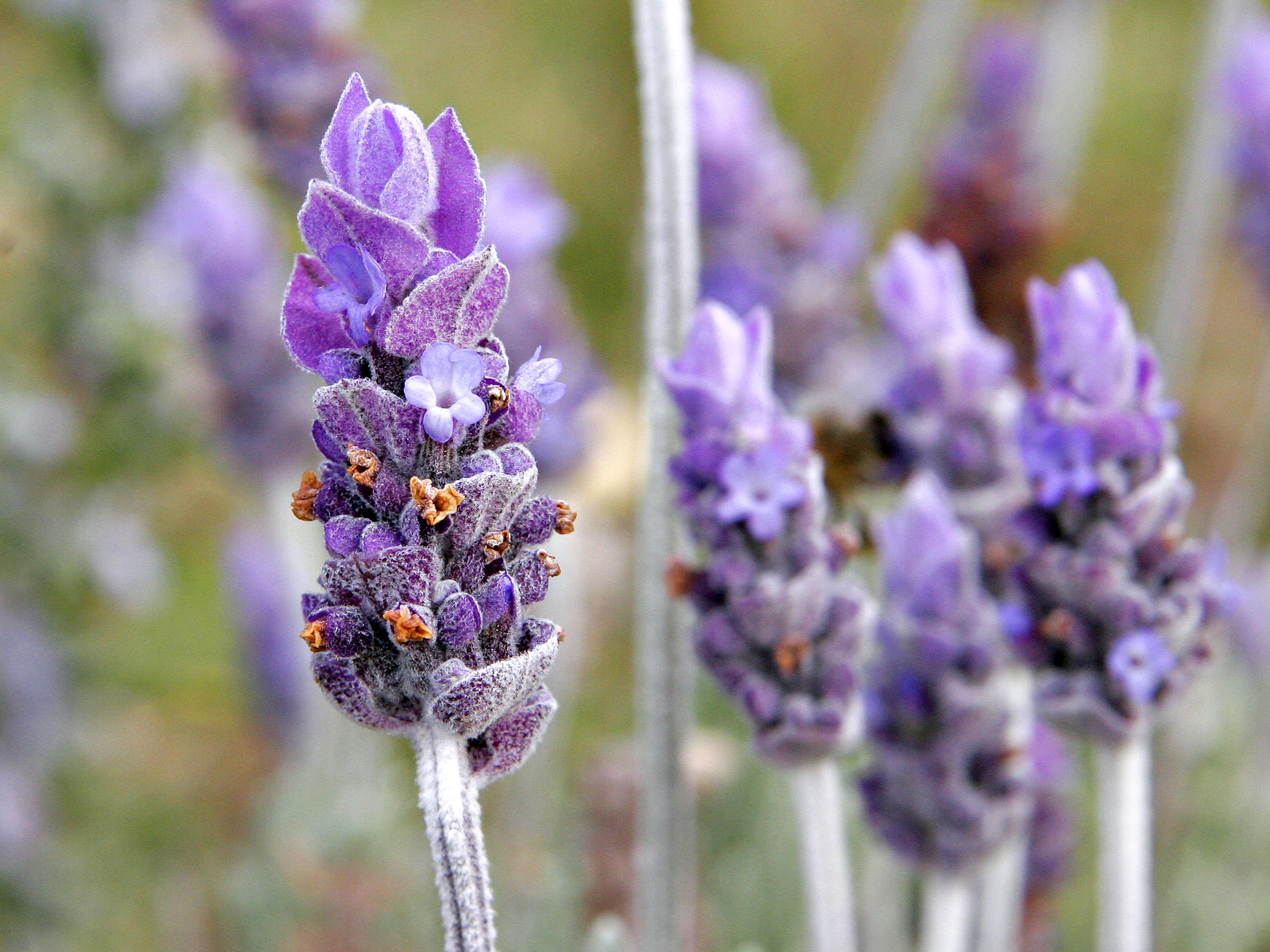
Lavender

Popular flowers in the traditional cottage garden included florist's flowers which were grown by enthusiasts—such as violets, pinks, and primroses—and those grown with a more practical purpose. For example, the calendula, grown today almost entirely for its bright orange flowers, was primarily valued for eating, for adding color to butter and cheese, for adding smoothness to soups and stews, and for all kinds of healing salves and preparations. Like many old cottage garden annuals and herbs, it freely self-sowed, making it easier to grow and share. Other popular cottage garden annuals included violets, pansies, stocks, and mignonette.

Perennials were the largest group of traditional cottage garden flowers—those with a long cottage garden history include hollyhocks, carnations, sweet williams, marguerites, marigolds, lilies, peonies, tulips, crocus, daisies, foxglove, monkshood, lavender, campanulas, Solomon's seal, evening primrose, lily-of-the-valley, primrose, cowslips, and many varieties of roses.

Today herbs are typically thought of as culinary plants, but in the traditional cottage garden they were considered to be any plant with household uses. Herbs were used for medicine, toiletries, and cleaning products. Scented herbs would be spread on the floor along with rushes to cover odors. Some herbs were used for dyeing fabrics. Traditional cottage garden herbs included sage, thyme, southernwood, wormwood, catmint, feverfew, lungwort, soapwort, hyssop, sweet woodruff, and lavender.

=== Fruits ===
Fruit in the traditional cottage garden would have included an apple and a pear, for cider and perry, gooseberries and raspberries. The modern cottage garden includes many varieties of ornamental fruit and nut trees, such as crabapple and hazel, along with non-traditional trees like dogwood.

== See also ==
- Garden design
- History of landscape architecture
- Landscape architecture
