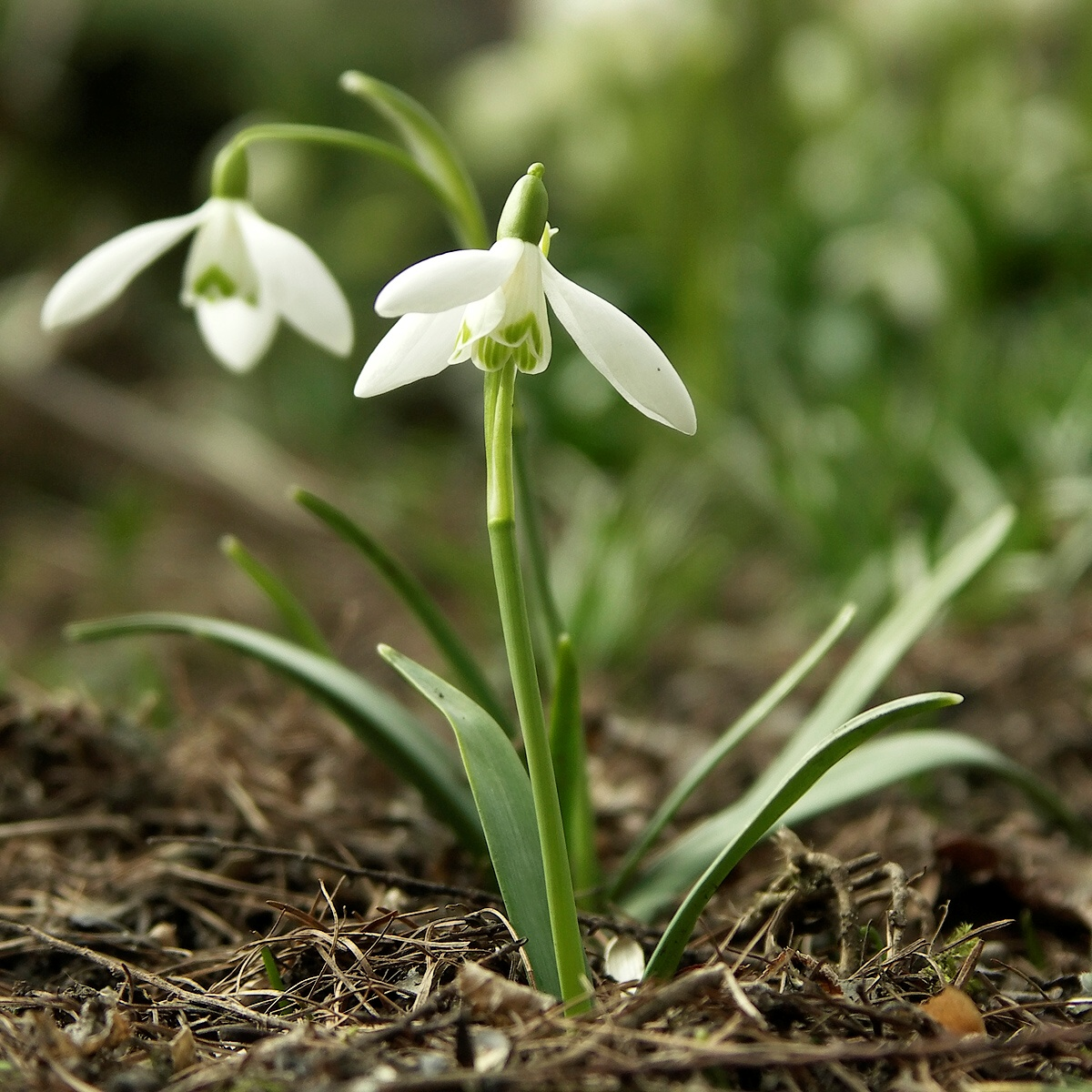

Conservation status
- Near Threatened (IUCN 3.1)
- CITES Appendix II

Scientific classification
- Kingdom: Plantae
- Clade: Embryophytes
- Clade: Tracheophytes
- Clade: Spermatophytes
- Clade: Angiosperms
- Clade: Monocots
- Order: Asparagales
- Family: Amaryllidaceae
- Subfamily: Amaryllidoideae
- Genus: Galanthus
- Species: G. nivalis

Binomial name
- Galanthus nivalis L.
- Range of G. nivalis, excluding introduced range in the British Isles Extant, resident

Synonyms
- Chianthemum nivale (L.) Kuntze; Galanthus alexandri Porcius; Galanthus imperati Bertol.; Galanthus melvillei Voss; Galanthus montanus Schur; Galanthus scharlokii (Casp.) Baker; Galanthus umbricus Dammann

= Galanthus nivalis =

Species of flowering plant known as snowdrop

Galanthus nivalis, the snowdrop or common snowdrop, is the best-known and most widespread of the 20 species in its genus, Galanthus. Snowdrops are among the first bulbs to bloom in spring and can form impressive carpets of white in areas where they are native or have been naturalised. They should not be confused with the snowflakes, in the genera Leucojum and Acis.

== Naming ==
The generic name Galanthus, from the Greek gala (milk) and anthos (flower), was given to the genus by Carl Linnaeus in 1735. He described Galanthus nivalis in his Species Plantarum published in 1753. The epithet nivalis means "of the snow", referring either to the snow-like flower or the plant's early flowering.

The common name snowdrop first appeared in the 1633 edition of John Gerard's Great Herbal (in the first edition (1597) he described it as the "Timely flowring Bulbus violet"). The derivation of the name is uncertain, although it may have come from the German word Schneetropfen, which was a type of earring popular around that time. Other British traditional common names include "February fairmaids", "dingle-dangle", "Candlemas bells", "Mary's tapers" and, in parts of Yorkshire, "snow piercers" (like the French name perce-neige).

== Distribution and habitat ==
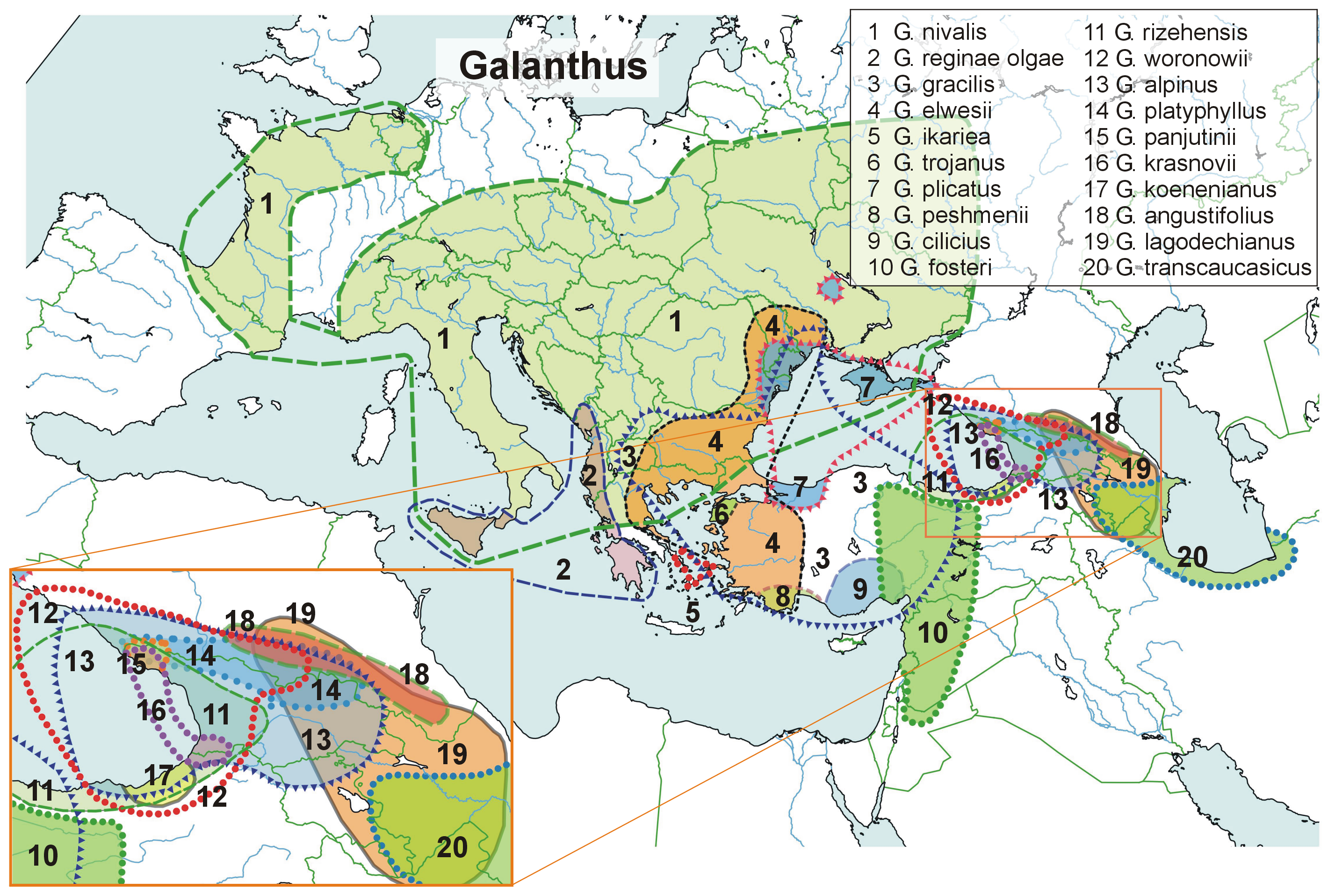
Distribution map of Galanthus species in Europe and Western Asia (An attempt at a representation according to the natural place indicated in the respective Wikipedia pages (en, de, ru, fr))

Galanthus nivalis is widely grown in gardens, particularly in northern Europe, and is widely naturalised in woodlands in the regions where it is grown. It is, however, native to a large area of Europe, from Spain in the west, eastwards to Ukraine. It is native to Albania, Armenia, Austria, Bosnia and Herzegovina, Bulgaria, Croatia, the Czech Republic, France, Georgia, Germany, Greece, Hungary, Italy, Poland, Macedonia, Moldova, Montenegro, Romania, Serbia, Slovakia, Slovenia, Spain, Switzerland, Turkey, and Ukraine. It is considered naturalised in Great Britain, Belgium, Netherlands, Norway, Sweden, Denmark and parts of North America (Newfoundland, New Brunswick, Ontario, Massachusetts, Alabama, Rhode Island, Connecticut, Delaware, Indiana, Washington state, New York state, Michigan, Utah, New Jersey, Ohio, Pennsylvania, Maryland, Virginia and North Carolina).

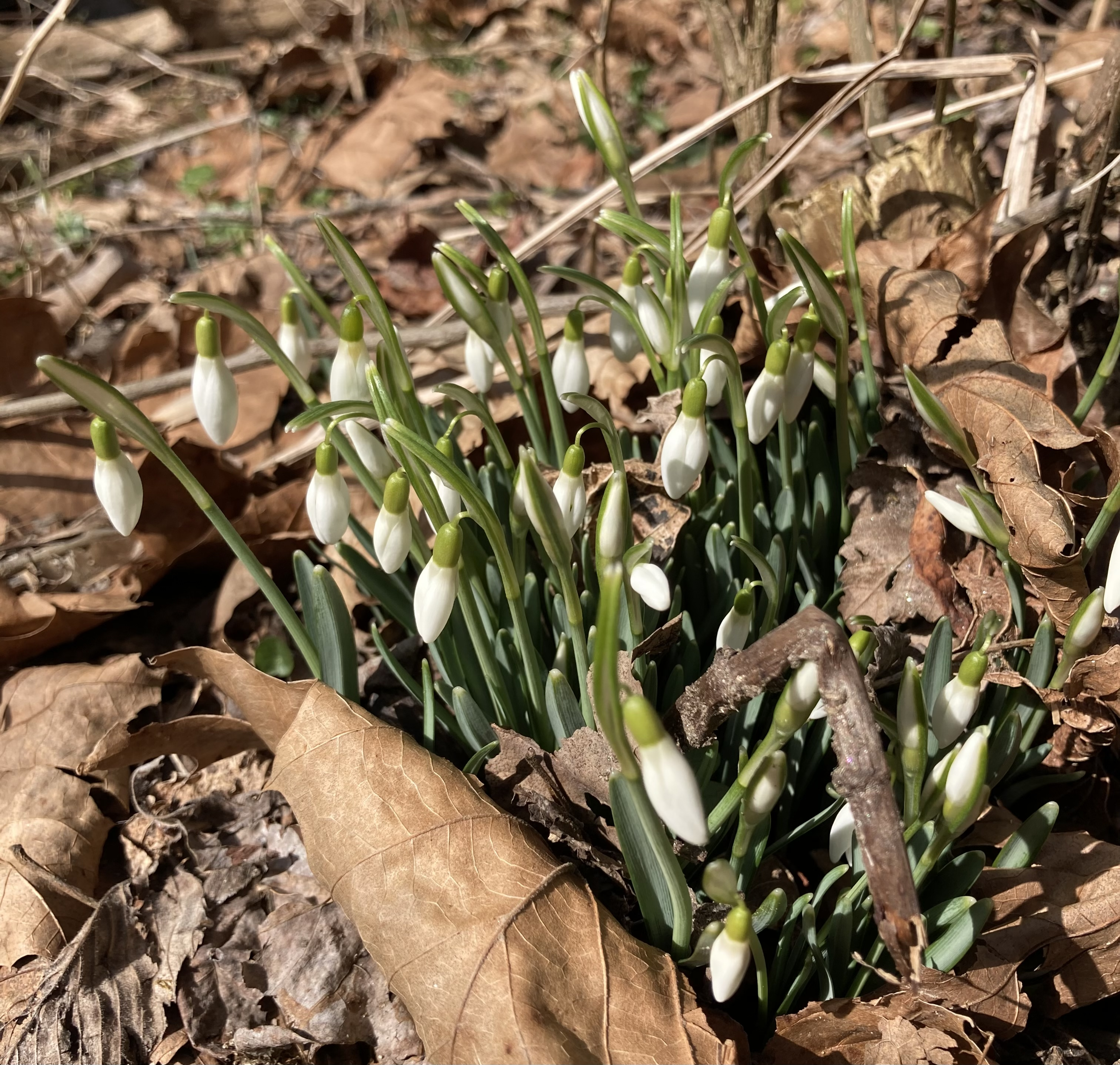
Naturalized snowdrops in Wissahickon Valley Park in early March

Although often thought of as a British native wild flower, or to have been brought to the British Isles by the Romans, it is now thought that it was probably introduced much later, perhaps around the early sixteenth century.

== Description ==
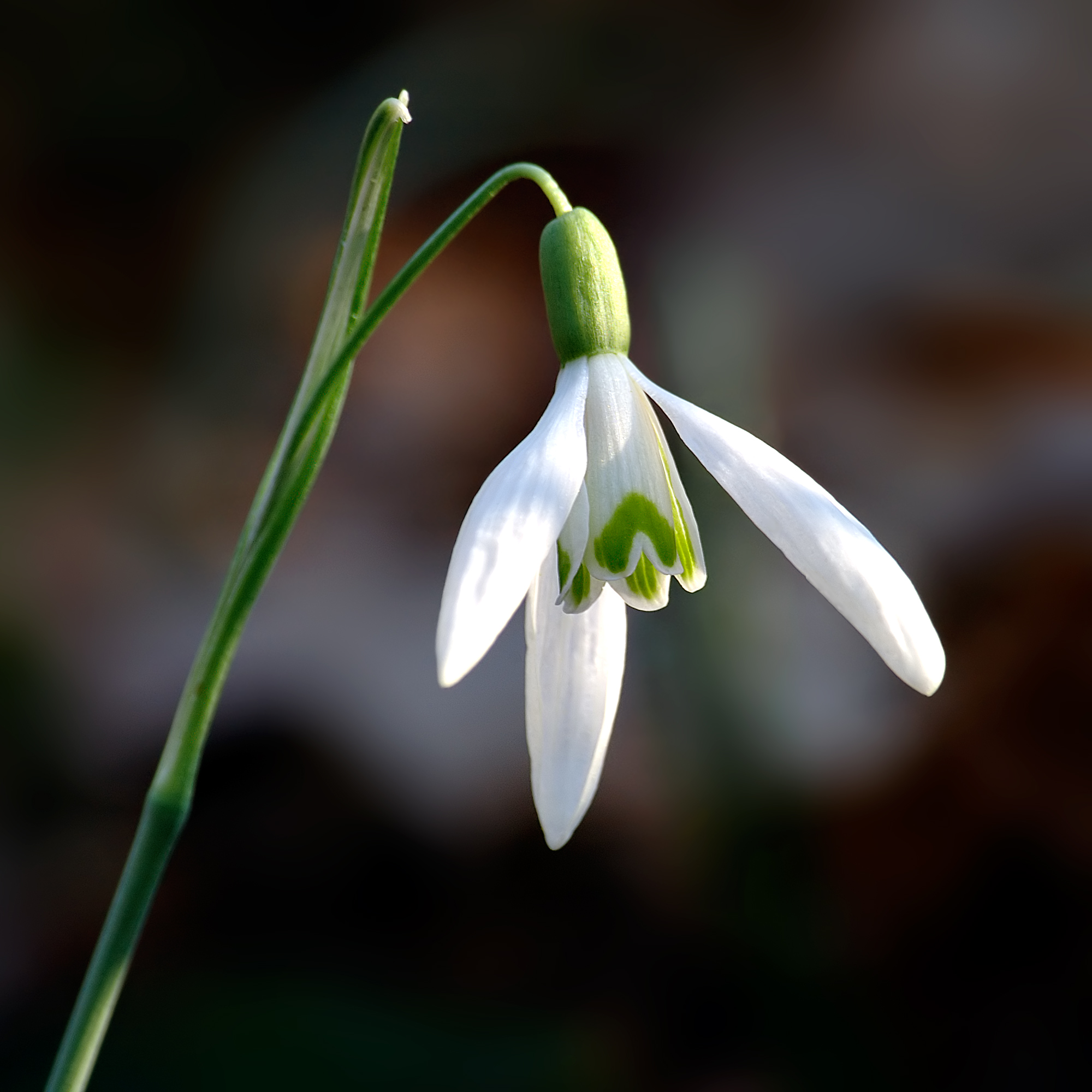
Common snowdrop

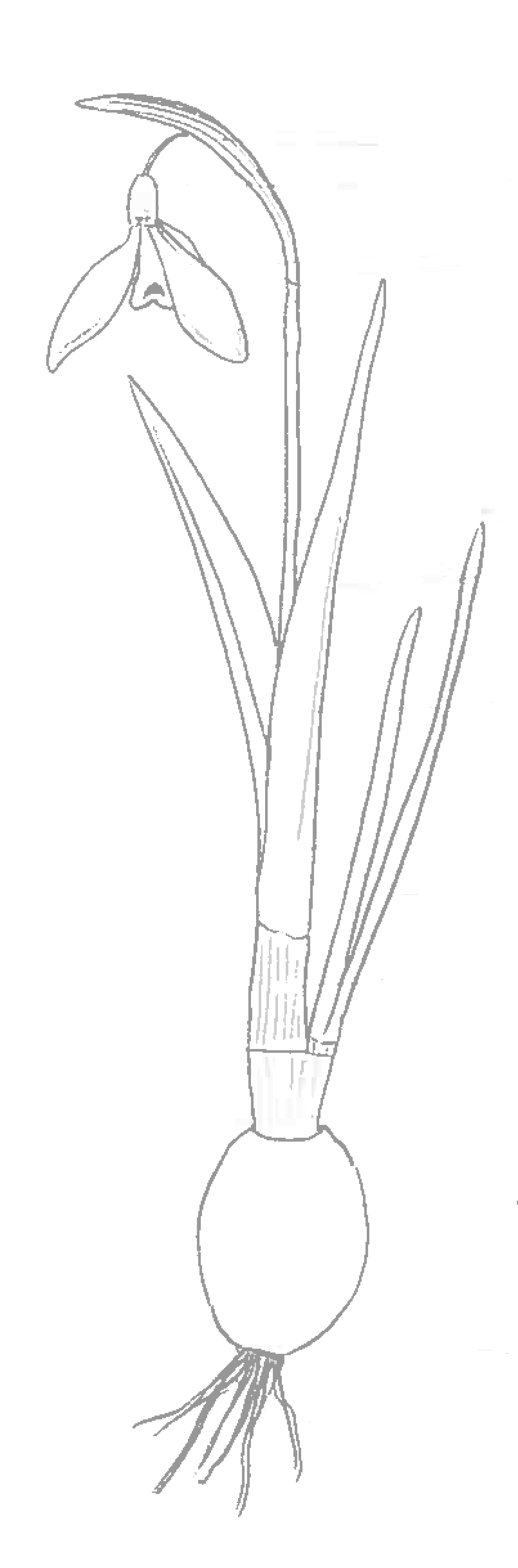

Galanthus nivalis grows to around 7–15 cm tall, flowering between January and April in the northern temperate zone (January–May in the wild). They are perennial, herbaceous plants which grow from bulbs. Each bulb generally produces two linear, or very narrowly lanceolate, greyish-green leaves and an erect, leafless scape (flowering stalk), which bears at the top a pair of bract-like spathe valves joined by a papery membrane. From between them emerges a solitary, pendulous, bell-shaped white flower, held on a slender pedicel.

The flower consists of six tepals, also referred to as segments. The outer three are larger and more convex than the inner ones. The inner flower segments are usually marked on their outer surface with a green or greenish-yellow V- or U-shaped mark (sometimes described as "bridge-shaped") over the small sinus (notch) at the tip of each tepal. The inner surface has a faint green mark covering all or most of it. Occasionally plants are found with green markings on the outer surface of the outer tepals.

The six long, pointed anthers open by pores or short slits. The ovary is three-celled, ripening into a three-celled capsule. Each whitish seed has a small, fleshy tail (the elaiosome) containing substances attractive to ants which distribute the seeds. The leaves die back a few weeks after the flowers have faded.

G. nivalis is a cross-pollinating plant, but sometimes self-pollination takes place. It is pollinated by bees.

== Cultivation and propagation ==
See Galanthus §Propagation.

== Active substances ==
Snowdrops contain an active substance called galantamine (or galanthamine) which can be helpful in the treatment of mild to moderate Alzheimer's disease, though it is not a cure. Galantamine was first isolated and extracted from snowdrops by a team of chemists led by Dimitar Paskov in Bulgaria, where snowdrops are endemic.

Snowdrops contain also an active lectin or agglutinin named GNA for Galanthus nivalis agglutinin. It forms a homotetramer of beta barrels that can bind up to twelve mannose residues. It is insecticidal, likely causing toxicity by binding glycated elements of the insect's gut, and has antiretroviral properties. Potatoes have been genetically modified with the GNA gene. In 1998 Árpád Pusztai said in an interview on a World in Action programme that his group had observed damage to the intestines and immune systems of rats fed the genetically modified potatoes. He also said "If I had the choice I would certainly not eat it", and that "I find it's very unfair to use our fellow citizens as guinea pigs". These remarks were criticised by the scientific community and started the so-called Pusztai affair. A subsequent review of Pusztai's work by the Royal Society showed that Pusztai's experiments were poorly designed and used incorrect statistical analysis.

== Cultivars ==
Galanthus nivalis has won the Royal Horticultural Society's Award of Garden Merit.

The common double snowdrop, Galanthus nivalis f. pleniflorus 'Flore Pleno', had appeared by 1703, when it was illustrated in The Duchess of Beaufort's Book. It spread (and was spread) rapidly through northern Europe (by vegetative means, as it sets no seed). With 3–5 outer segments and 12–21 inner segments, which are often misshapen, the flowers may be less attractive to the eye of the purist than single-flowered or neater double cultivars, but they are good value in the garden as the bulbs spread rapidly and the large flowers show up well.

There are numerous named cultivars of G. nivalis, single, semi-double, double and "poculiform" (meaning goblet or cup-shaped, this refers to flowers with inner segments that are almost the same shape and length as the outer ones). Apart from these traits they differ particularly in the size and markings of the flower and the period of flowering; other characteristics are less obvious to the untrained eye and are mainly of interest to "galanthophiles".

=== Some single-flowered cultivars ===
- Galanthus nivalis 'Anglesey Abbey' – green-leaved (rather than the usual greyish-green) and vigorous, with some flowers poculiform, some semi-poculiform and others normal. This cultivar (discovered at Anglesey Abbey, Lode, Cambridgeshire, UK, the source of several good cultivars) was at first identified as belonging to G.lagodechianus, a rarely grown green-leafed species, or a hybrid between it and G. nivalis, but has now been shown to be an unusual variant of G. nivalis

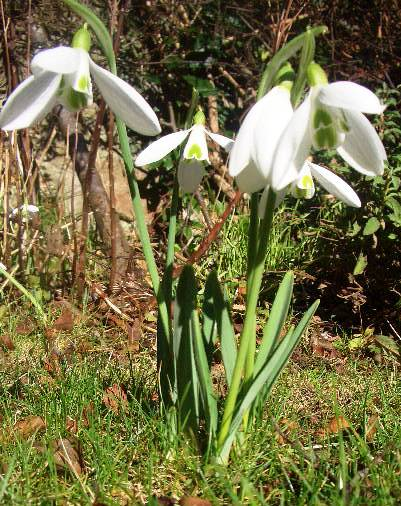
Galanthus nivalis 'Atkinsii', 18 cm high

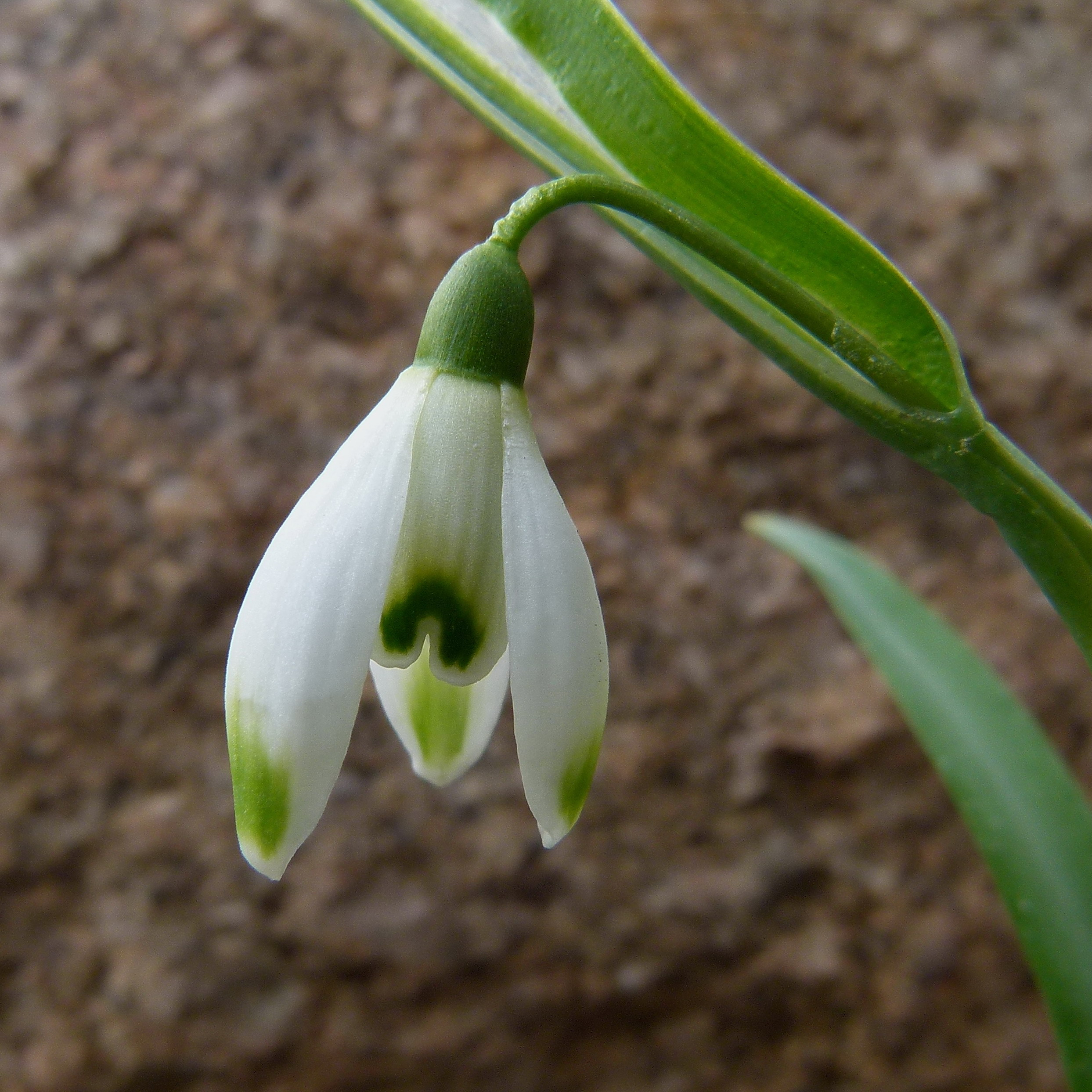
Galanthus nivalis 'Viridapice'

- G. nivalis 'Atkinsii' – Allen reported to the RHS 1891 Snowdrop Meeting: this is "second to none in size, form, quality and freedom of growth." "James Atkins of Painswick received it from a friend, presumably in the 1860s ... He gave this snowdrop to Canon Ellacombe" of Bitton who widely distributed it.
- G. nivalis 'Blonde Inge' – mark on inner segments is yellow, sometimes rather bronzy or "tarnished"-looking, although the ovary is green (unlike most "yellow" snowdrops). Discovered near Cologne, Germany, in 1977
- G. nivalis Poculiformis Group – inner segments are almost same length and shape as outer ones, usually unmarked and without a "sinus" (notch); includes such cultivars as 'Sandhill Gate'
- G. nivalis Sandersii Group – ovary and marks on inner segments are yellow instead of green; leaves and flower-stalks may also be slightly yellowish; includes those plants known as 'Flavescens', 'Lutescens' and 'Sandersii', and more recent cultivars such as 'Ray Cobb' and 'Savill Gold'. 'Sandersii' was the first to be named (as G. nivalis var. sandersii) in 1877; it was found near Belford, Northumberland; 'Flavescens', a taller, finer clone, was found in a cottage garden in Whittingham, Northumberland in 1889 (and named G. flavescens). Yellow-flowered snowdrops are relatively frequent in woodlands in Northumberland but seem to be decreasing, perhaps due to illegal collecting. They tend to be less vigorous than normal G. nivalis and may prove difficult to grow
- G. nivalis Scharlockii Group – "donkey's ears snowdrops" have an elongated, foliose spathe that is split down the centre, resembling upright ears. The Group is very variable in height. The original 'Scharlockii' was found in the Nahe valley, Germany, and named in 1868; it has green markings on its outer segments. Seedlings have been raised from it that have the split spathe but no green outer markings, or that have the markings but a normal spathe. Double-flowered seedlings have also arisen
- G. nivalis 'Snow White's Gnome' – at less than 5 cm tall in flower, this is possibly the world's smallest snowdrop cultivar. Found in the Czech Republic in 1990, it has relatively long, upright spathes, around half the height of the entire flowering shoot. The flowers are albino (with no markings at all), or almost so, with only two tiny dots per inner segment
- G. nivalis 'Viridapice' – variable in size and vigour (some larger plants have been shown to be triploid), the flowers have green-tipped outer segments; the spathe may be normal, or elongated and inflated or foliose; found in northern Holland by JMC Hoog of the famous Dutch bulb company; painted by EA Bowles in 1916
- G. nivalis 'Virescens' – "the original green snowdrop" (dating from with large areas of pale green covering roughly two-thirds of the outer segments (nearest the ovary, not extending to the tips). Narrow flowers, with rather flattened outer segments, flaring outward at the tips. Late flowering, often into April
- G. nivalis 'Warei' – a very sturdy triploid, with green-tipped outer segments, similar to 'Viridapice' but larger, with enormous foliose spathes up to 11 cm long. Originated in 1886 among some bulbs of G. nivalis 'Scharlockii'

=== Some double-flowered cultivars ===
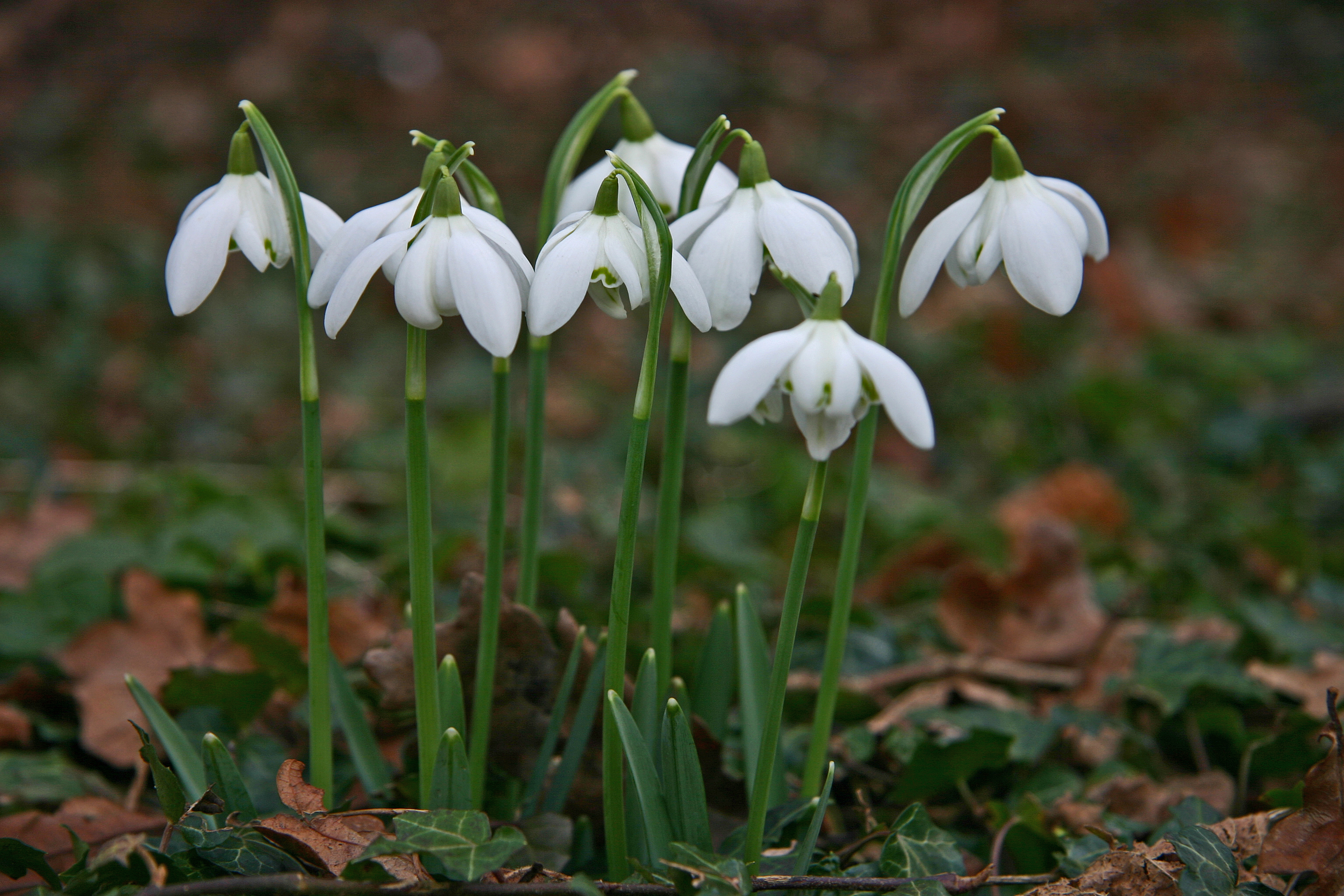
A double snowdrop, Galanthus nivalis f. pleniflorus 'Flore Pleno'

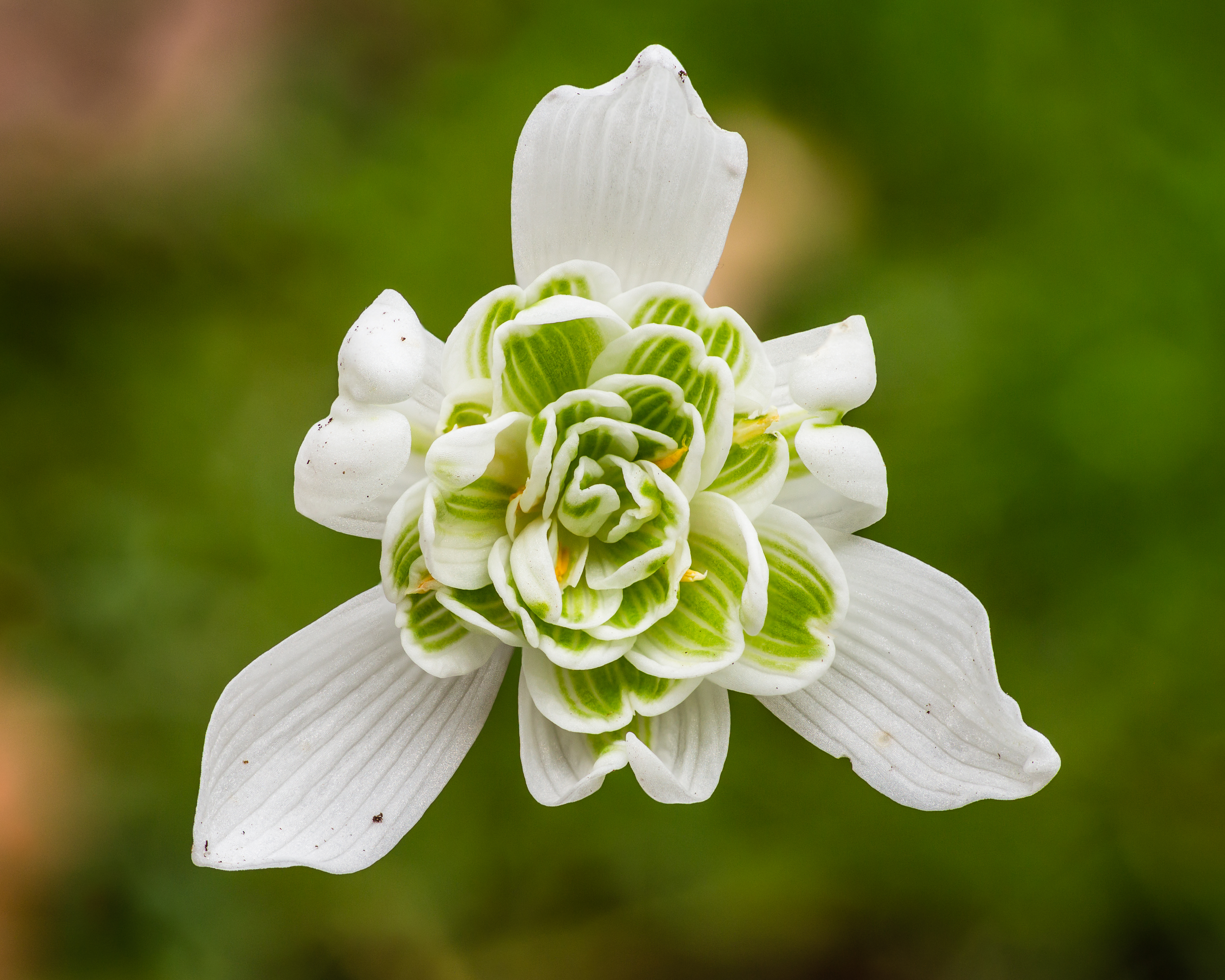
A double snowdrop

- G. nivalis f. pleniflorus 'Blewbury Tart' – curious, untidy, upward- or outward-facing flowers with dark green markings in the centre; found in Blewbury, UK, in 1975
- G. nivalis f. pleniflorus 'Doncaster's Double Scharlock' – a loose double, with three to six outers, strongly tipped with green, and a long, upright split spathe (the two parts of which sometimes cross over each other); named after plantswoman Amy Doncaster, who grew it as 'Scharlockii Flore Pleno', thinking that it must be the same as the double raised from seed of 'Scharlockii' by nurseryman James Allen early in the 20th century, but a contemporary drawing of the original plant shows it to have been less striking than this one
- G. nivalis f. pleniflorus 'Flore Pleno' – the most common double snowdrop, having three to five unmarked outer segments surrounding rosettes of numerous green-marked inner segments, usually of uneven length, giving a quite untidy appearance
- G. nivalis f. pleniflorus 'Lady Elphinstone' – a version of 'Flore Pleno' with yellow colouring inside the flowers instead of green; may revert to the normal 'Flore Pleno' or vary from year to year; found in Cheshire, UK, in the late 19th century
- G. nivalis f. pleniflorus 'Walrus' – a curious double, its outers resemble narrow, tubular, greenish "tusks" up to 2.5 cm long, the inners usually form a neat, widely splayed rosette; the long foliose spathe may sometimes split, as in 'Scharlockii'; selected at Maidwell, Northamptonshire in the 1960s
- "Spiky doubles" – occasionally found among normal "wild" G. nivalis are bulbs that produce upward-facing tufts of narrow, quill-like segments, looking like a white, off-white, greenish shuttlecock or shaving brush. 'Boyd's Double', the first of these to be documented (found prior to 1905), is still the darkest green in colour; others include 'Cockatoo', 'Ermine Spiky' and 'Irish Green'

== Snowdrop gardens ==
Many gardens, especially in the UK and Ireland, open in February for visitors to admire the flowers. These displays may attract large numbers of sightseers. Some feature extensive displays of naturalised G. nivalis; others have more specialised collections of many species, forms and cultivars.

== See also ==
- List of snowdrop gardens

== Bibliography ==
- Bishop, Matt; Davis, Aaron P.; Grimshaw, John (2002). Snowdrops: A Monograph of Cultivated Galanthus. Griffin Press. ISBN 0-9541916-0-9.
- Mabey, Richard (1996). Flora Britannica. London: Sinclair-Stevenson. ISBN 1-85619-377-2.
- Stern, F. C. (1956). Snowdrops and Snowflakes – a Study of the Genera Galanthus and Leucojum. Royal Horticultural Society.
