= Galanthophile =

A galanthophile is an enthusiastic collector and identifier of snowdrop (Galanthus) species and cultivars.

== Term ==
The term galanthophile was probably coined by a noted British plantsman and garden writer E. A. Bowles (1865–1954), in a letter to his friend Oliver Wyatt, another keen collector of bulbs, whom he addressed as "Dear Galanthophil". Wyatt may have been the first to whom the term was applied, but he was by no means the first to be one. Apart from Bowles himself, there had been keen snowdrop collectors since at least the mid-19th century. Many galanthophiles are recalled in names of snowdrop species or cultivars. Nurseryman James Atkins (1804–1884) of Northampton was one of the earliest so honoured, and the tall, early-flowering, robust Galanthus 'Atkinsii' is still grown, having been distributed widely by Canon Ellacombe of Bitton.

== Collectors ==
James Allen (1832–1906) of Shepton Mallet was probably the first to raise hybrid snowdrops from deliberate cross cultivation of seed. He claimed in 1891 to have grown every known species of Galanthus and raised over 100 distinct seedlings, but much of his collection was lost to botrytis and narcissus fly soon afterward. At least two of his cultivars, G. 'Magnet' and G. 'Merlin', survive and are widely grown by collectors. He also raised hybrids which he called G. 'Galatea' and G. 'Robin Hood', but the plants now grown under those names may not be the same as those he selected. Galanthus x allenii is a hybrid of unknown origin that appeared in a batch of G. latifolius (now G. platyphyllus), which Allen received from an Austrian supplier in 1883. (According to Bishop et al., it is more likely that the bulbs were another broad-leaved species, G. woronowii, often confused with G. platyphyllus.) The bulbs were probably collected in the Caucasus, but G. × allenii has never been found in the wild since, so that no one can do more than speculate on where the cross occurred and what other species may have been involved. It is a handsome plant with broad, greenish-grey foliage and fairly large flowers, which smell of bitter almonds.

Margery Fish at East Lambrook Manor, Somerset, was another enthusiast and popularizer of Galanthus nivalis and its varieties in the 1950s and 1960s.

Notable modern galanthophiles include the late Primrose Warburg (1920–1996), after whom G. 'Primrose Warburg' is named: appropriately, it has yellow markings and a yellow ovary. (Primrose ovaries are generally green.) She was married to the noted botanist E. F. Warburg. Several other fine snowdrops originated at her garden at South Hayes in Oxfordshire, including the unusual cultivar named G. 'South Hayes' which has strong green markings on the outer tepals of the flower.

Botanist Aaron Davis and gardeners Matt Bishop and John Grimshaw, authors of the works on which these notes are based, also qualify as galanthophiles.
