= James Allen (nurseryman) =

James Allen (1830 – 1906), known as the "Snowdrop King," was a nurseryman and galanthophile of Shepton Mallet, Somerset, United Kingdom, known principally for his hybridizations of snowdrops and anemones. He is credited with the discovery of Galanthus ×allenii (1883).

Allen spotted Galanthus ×allenii amongst a batch of bulbs that had been imported from the Caucasus. Originally classed as a species, this strongly scented snowdrop is now thought to be a hybrid. It is described as being "intermediate in appearance between G. caucasicus [ now G. elwesii var. monostictus ] and G. ikariae", and may be a natural hybrid between those species.
