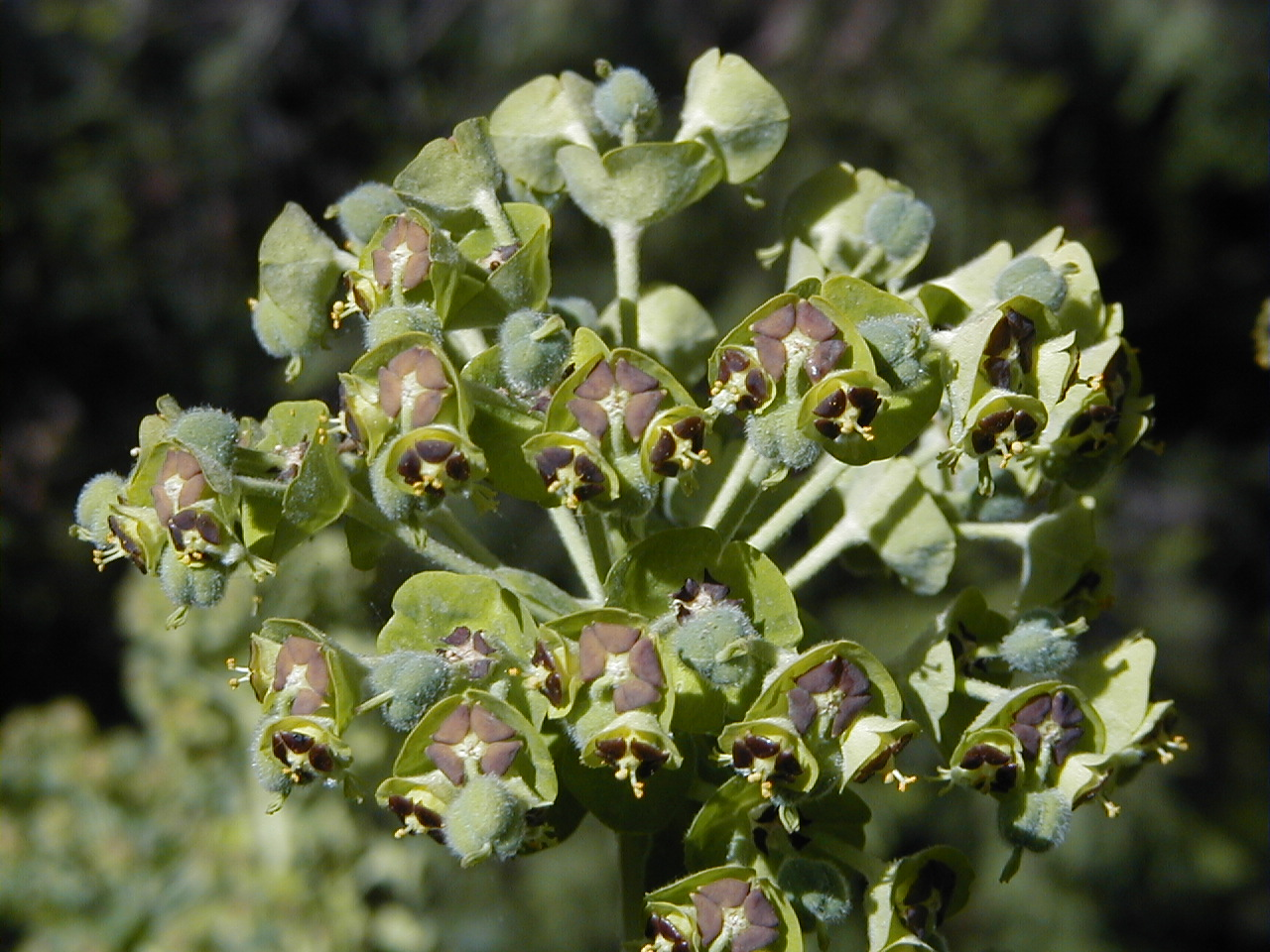

Scientific classification
- Kingdom: Plantae
- Clade: Tracheophytes
- Clade: Angiosperms
- Clade: Eudicots
- Clade: Rosids
- Order: Malpighiales
- Family: Euphorbiaceae
- Genus: Euphorbia
- Species: E. characias

Binomial name
- Euphorbia characias L.

Synonyms
- List: Characias purpurea Gray; Esula characias (L.) Haw.; Euphorbia cretica Mill.; Euphorbia cuatrecasasii Pau; Euphorbia eriocarpa Bertol.; Euphorbia lycia Boiss.; Euphorbia melapetala Gasp. ex Guss.; Euphorbia messeniaca Heldr. ex Halácsy nom. illeg.; Euphorbia rubens Chaix; Euphorbia sibthorpii Boiss.; Euphorbia veneta Willd.; Euphorbia wulfenii Hoppe ex W.D.J.Koch; Galarhoeus creticus (Mill.) Haw.; Tithymalus characias (L.) Hill; Tithymalus melapetalus (Gasp. ex Guss.) Klotzsch & Garcke; Tithymalus purpureus Lam.; Tithymalus serotina Raf.; Tithymalus sibthorpii (Boiss.) Soják; Tithymalus venetus (Willd.) Klotzsch & Garcke; Tithymalus wulfenii (Hoppe ex W.D.J.Koch) Soják

= Euphorbia characias =

Species of spurge

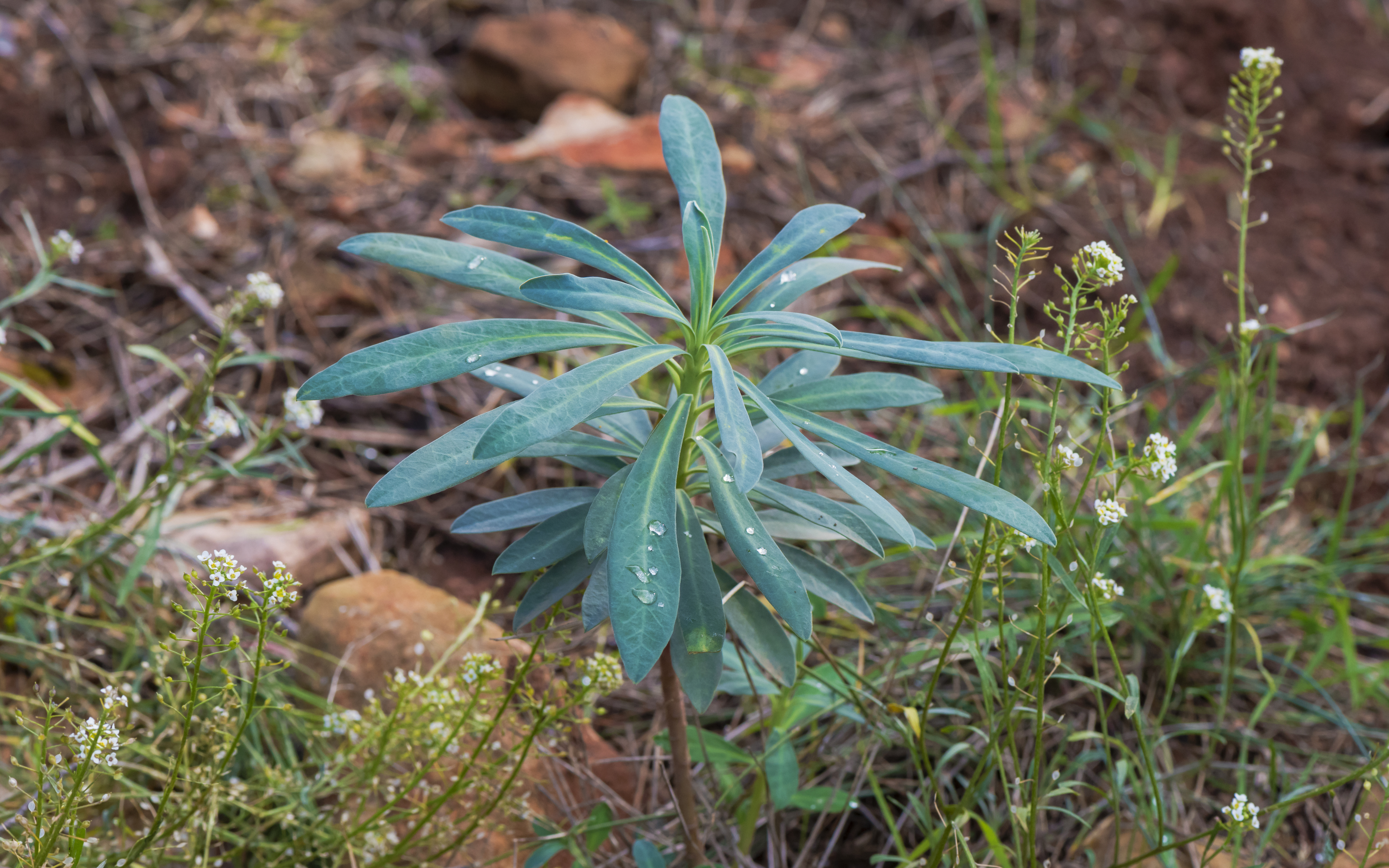

Euphorbia characias, the Mediterranean spurge is a species of flowering plant in the family Euphorbiaceae typical of the Mediterranean vegetation. It is an upright, compact evergreen shrub growing to 1.2 m (3 ft 11 in) tall and wide.

== Description ==
It has many medium to tall unbranched stems with long narrow leaves, clothed densely in short hair (tomentose), and dark (ssp characias) or yellow (ssp wulfenii) floral nectar glands within the yellow cup-like cyathia, which are borne in large dense spherical to oblong clusters, from spring to early summer. The fruits are smooth densely-hairy capsules. It is a tough plant, capable of resisting long periods of drought. It grows preferably in dry areas, often far away from the water table, both in flat as well as in mountainous terrain. This plant can also resist high salinity.

Similar species include E. kotschyana (leaf uppersides shiny) and E. thompsonii (leaves hairy but upper leaves unexpectedly very short).

== Subspecies ==
Two main subspecies are found in different regions of the Mediterranean Basin; these often overlap in the western areas of distribution:.

- E. characias L. subsp. characias. From Portugal to Crete (floral glands dark, stems to 80 cm).
- E. characias subsp. wulfenii (Hoppe ex W.D.J.Koch) Radcl.-Sm.. From Southern France to Anatolia (floral glands yellow, stems to 180 cm).

== Cultivation ==
Euphorbia characias is valued as an ornamental plant for its ability to survive drought and its groundcovering capabilities. It is suitable for any location, sheltered or exposed, in light soil in full sun. It is fully hardy down to −10 °C (14 °F).

=== Cultivars ===
Garden cultivars are sold under the names ‘Black Pearl’, ‘Thelma's Giant’, ‘Lambrook Gold’, ‘Silver Swan’ and ‘Tasmanian Tiger’, among others. They come in a variety of colors, from silvery grey and bluish green to greenish yellow. These garden varieties are valued in Mediterranean or desert landscaping for not being highly demanding and for looking good despite lack of watering in sunny areas.

The following cultivars have gained the Royal Horticultural Society's Award of Garden Merit:-

- ‘Tasmanian Tiger’
- ‘Whistleberry Garnet’
- E. characias subsp. characias ‘Blue Hills’
- E. characias subsp. wulfenii ‘Jimmy Platt’

== Uses ==
This plant also has uses in traditional medicine; like many other species of genus Euphorbia its toxic white and sticky sap has been used to treat skin excrescences, like cancers, tumors, and warts, since ancient times.

== Gallery ==
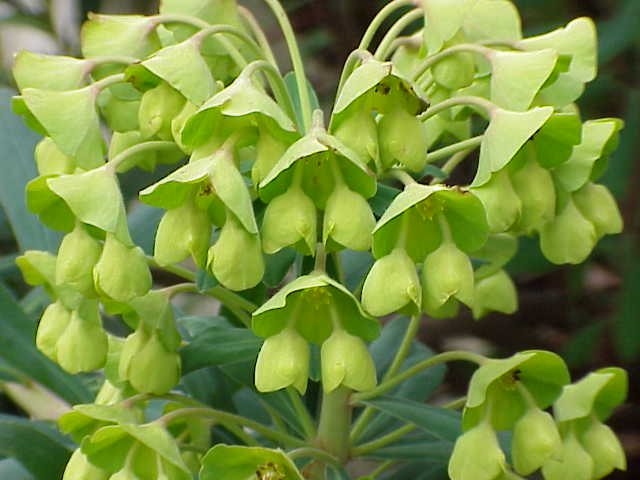

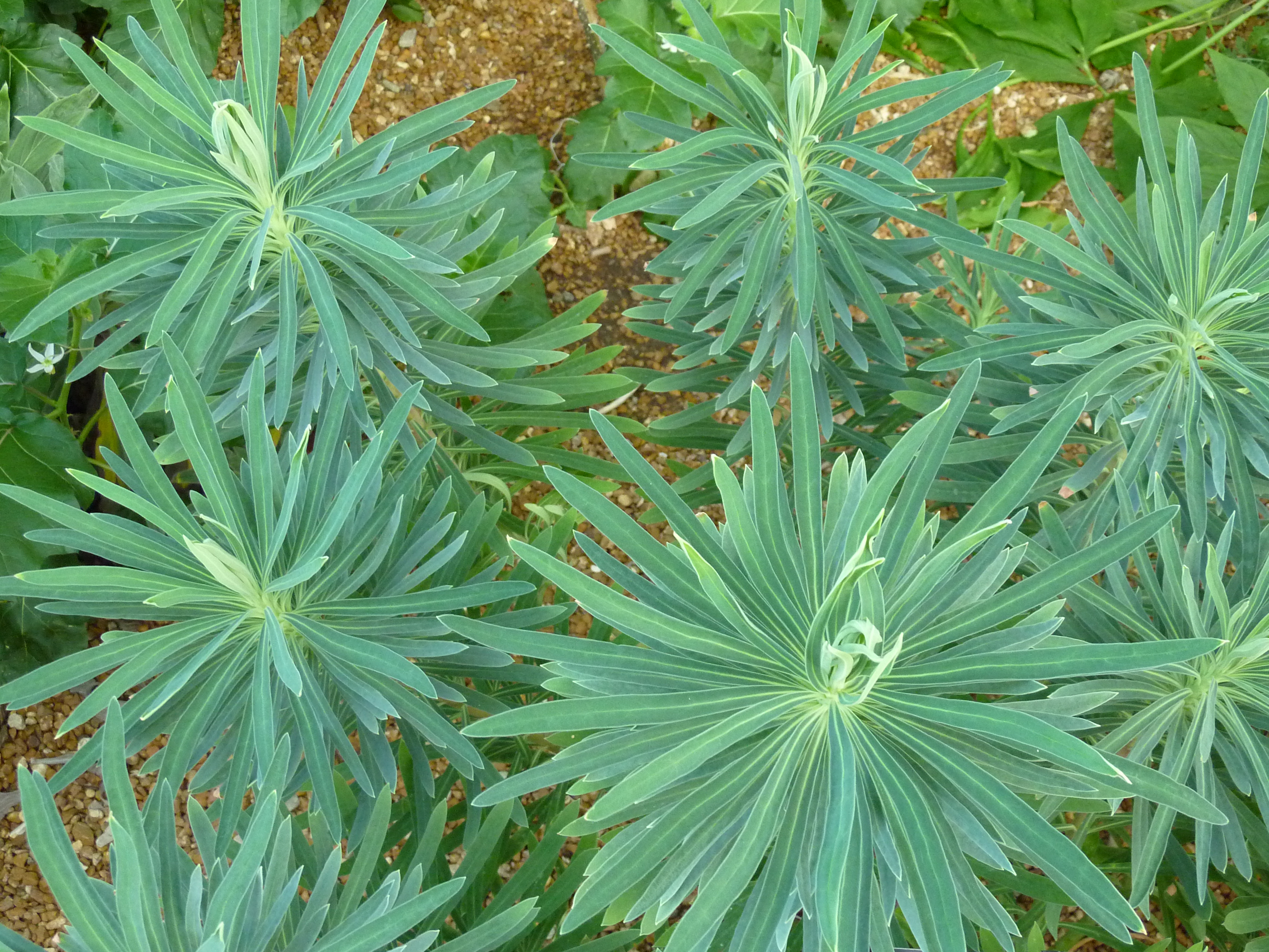
Missouri Botanical Garden

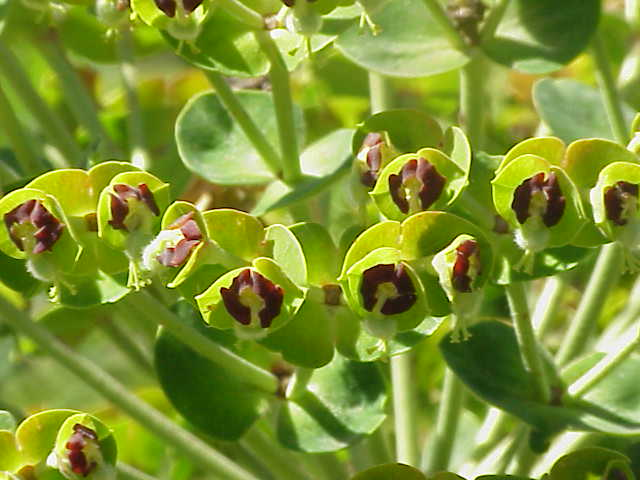

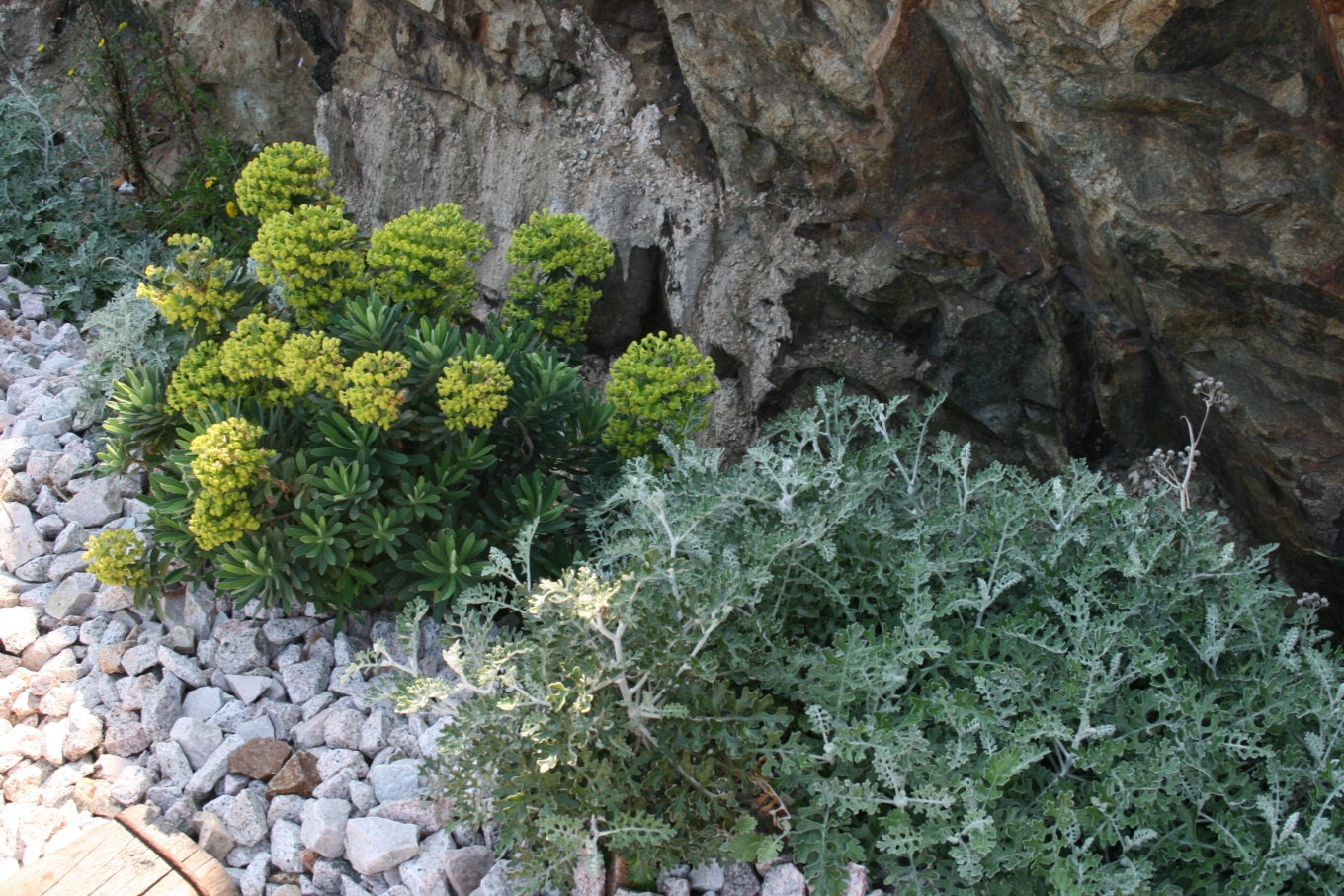
(with Jacobaea maritima)
