= East Lambrook Manor =

Manor house in Somerset, England

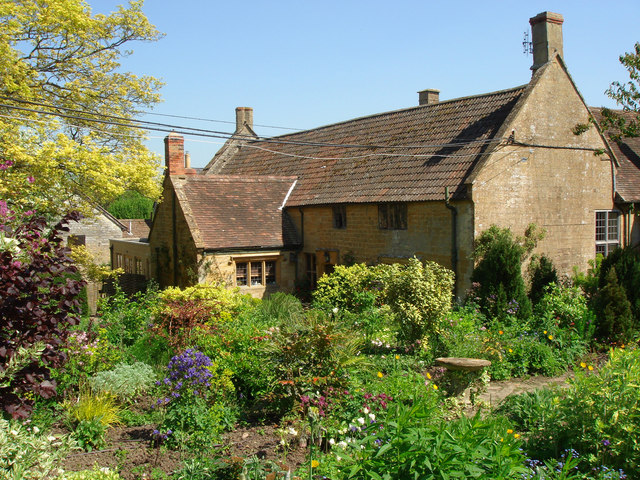
East Lambrook Manor

East Lambrook Manor is a small 15th-century manor house in East Lambrook, Somerset, England, registered by English Heritage as a Grade II* listed building. It is surrounded by a "cottage garden" planted by Margery Fish between 1938 and her death in 1969. The garden is Grade I listed in the Register of Historic Parks and Gardens of special historic interest in England.

== House ==
The two-storey house, Grade II* listed in 1959, was originally an open hall-house. It was built of Somerset hamstone in the 15th and 16th centuries. It was a disused chicken farm, which had fallen into disrepair until the restoration in the 1930s.

== Garden ==
East Lambrook Manor Gardens
- Interactive map of East Lambrook Manor Gardens
- Type: Cottage Garden
- Location: East Lambrook, Somerset, England
- Coordinates: 50.9667°N 2.811°W
- Area: 2 acres (0.81 ha)
- Plants: Geraniums, euphorbias, helleborus, snowdrops, roses, rare and unusual cottage garden plants
- Collections: National Collection of Geraniums
- Website: https://www.eastlambrook.co.uk/

Margery Fish and her husband Walter Fish bought East Lambrook Manor in 1937 for £1000. They had several terraces constructed in 1938. She described the informal planting style as "jungle gardening". She wrote several books on cottage gardens. She laid out the 2 acres (0.81 ha) gardens, which hold the National Collection of Geraniums, and a collection of snowdrops.

Several varieties of plants are named after the garden, including a silver-leafed wormwood, Artemisia absinthium 'Lambrook Silver', a spurge, Euphorbia characias ssp. wulfenii, 'Lambrook Gold', and a primrose Primula, 'Lambrook Mauve'.

The garden has been restored since 1985 into the state it was left at the time of Fish's death in 1969. It was awarded Grade I status by English Heritage in 1992. In 2011, the gardens were opened for a horticulture course, the East Lambrook Diploma in Horticulture, which covers both theoretical and practical gardening.

East Lambrook Manor gardens are open to the public for nine months of the year, usually from Tuesday to Saturday. The gardens are entered through the Malthouse, a stone building within the gardens which also contains a gallery and a café. Behind the Malthouse is an area known as the Ditch, which originally had water flowing through it. There Fish planted moisture-loving plants, but as the water no longer flows through the Ditch, it has been replanted as a sunken garden. To the east of the house is the Silver Garden, which includes Mediterranean plants, often with silver leaves.

== External source ==
- The official East Lambrook Manor Gardens website: eastlambrook.com
